= 1996 Ecuadorian general election =

Presidential and congressional election in Ecuador

- Presidential election
- 19 May 1996 (first round); 7 July 1996 (second round)
- Registered: 6,662,003
- Turnout: 67.94% (first round); 71.71% (second round)
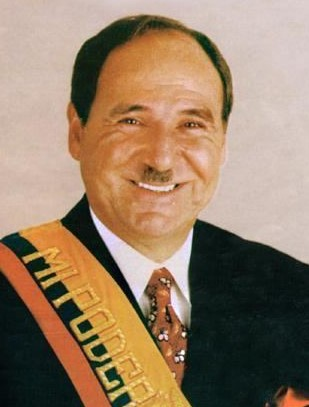

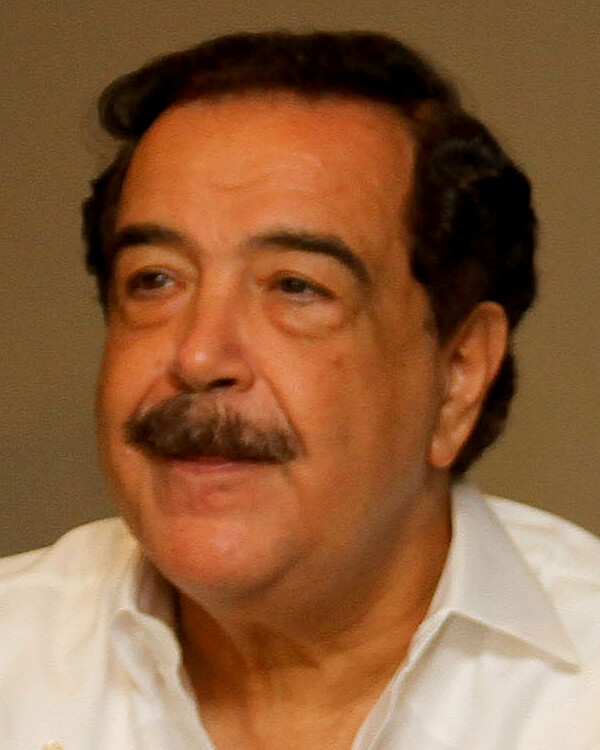
Nominee	Abdalá Bucaram	Jaime Nebot
Party	PRE	PSC
Running mate	Rosalía Arteaga	Diego Cordovez
Popular vote	2,285,397	1,910,651
Percentage	54.47%	45.53%
President before election
Sixto Durán Ballén
Union Republican Party
Elected President
Abdalá Bucaram
PRE

General elections were held in Ecuador on 19 May 1996, with a second round of the presidential elections on 7 July. Although Jaime Nebot of the Social Christian Party received the most votes in the first round, Abdalá Bucaram of the Ecuadorian Roldosist Party won the run-off with 54.5% of the vote. The Social Christian Party remained the largest in the Chamber of Deputies, winning 27 of the 82 seats.

Until the 2013 vote, this was the last election held after the natural expiration of a four-year presidential term. This due to a decade of political and economical instability that Ecuador experienced after Bucaram was impeached by the Congress in early 1997 and that lasted until Rafael Correa's inauguration in early 2007.

== Results ==
=== President ===
Candidate	Running mate	Party	First round		Second round	
Candidate	Running mate	Party	Votes	%	Votes	%
Jaime Nebot	Rosalía Arteaga	Social Christian Party	1,035,101	27.17	1,910,651	45.53
Abdalá Bucaram	Diego Cordovez	Ecuadorian Roldosist Party	1,001,071	26.28	2,285,397	54.47
Freddy Ehlers	Rosana Vinueza	Pachakutik	785,124	20.61		
Rodrigo Paz	Ramiro Larrea	Popular Democracy	513,464	13.48		
Frank Vargas Pazzos	Leonardo Vicuña	Ecuadorian Revolutionary Popular Action	187,935	4.93		
Ricardo Noboa	Francisco Huerta	FRA–PLRE	115,033	3.02		
Juan José Castelló	Lenín Rosero	Democratic People's Movement	89,472	2.35		
José Gallardo	Julio Molina	Civic Independent Union	46,464	1.22		
Jacinto Velásquez	Tito Yépez	Independent	36,080	0.95		
Total			3,809,744	100.00	4,196,048	100.00
Valid votes			3,809,744	84.18	4,196,048	87.83
Invalid/blank votes			716,137	15.82	581,478	12.17
Total votes			4,525,881	100.00	4,777,526	100.00
Registered voters/turnout			6,662,003	67.94	6,662,003	71.71
Source: Nohlen

=== National Congress ===
Party	National		Constituency		Total seats	+/–
Party	Votes	%	Votes	%	Total seats	+/–
Social Christian Party	1,069,977	30.36	983,850	27.89	27	+1
Ecuadorian Roldosist Party	718,983	20.40	752,276	21.32	19	+8
Pachakutik Plurinational Unity Movement – New Country	379,056	10.76	251,488	7.13	8	New
Popular Democracy	370,311	10.51	418,381	11.86	11	+7
FRA–PLRE	243,411	6.91	148,014	4.20	2	–1
Democratic Left	219,536	6.23	251,505	7.13	4	–4
Democratic People's Movement	153,714	4.36	150,176	4.26	2	–6
Ecuadorian Revolutionary Popular Action	105,902	3.01	123,732	3.51	2	0
Concentration of People's Forces	80,245	2.28	68,070	1.93	1	0
Conservative Party–UN	72,434	2.06	79,794	2.26	1	–5
Socialist Party–Broad Front	43,621	1.24	46,462	1.32	5	–
Latin American People's Union	28,998	0.82	17,612	0.50	5	–
National Alfarismo Party	22,987	0.65	30,080	0.85	5	–
Independent Transformative Insurgency Movement	14,771	0.42	3,016	0.09	5	–
Alfarista Radical Front			9,485	0.27	5	–
Ecuadorian Radical Liberal Party			5,467	0.15	5	–
ID–PSFA			3,501	0.10	5	–
Civic Independent Union			1,965	0.06	5	–
Other parties			183,256	5.19	5	–
Total	3,523,946	100.00	3,528,130	100.00	82	+5
Valid votes	3,523,946	77.94	3,528,130	78.12		
Invalid/blank votes	997,261	22.06	988,067	21.88		
Total votes	4,521,207	100.00	4,516,197	100.00		
Registered voters/turnout	6,662,003	67.87	6,662,003	67.79		
Source: Nohlen
