= 1992 Ecuadorian general election =

- Presidential election
- 17 May 1992 (first round); 5 July 1992 (second round)
- Registered: 5,710,363
- Turnout: 71.62% (first round); 73.10% (second round)
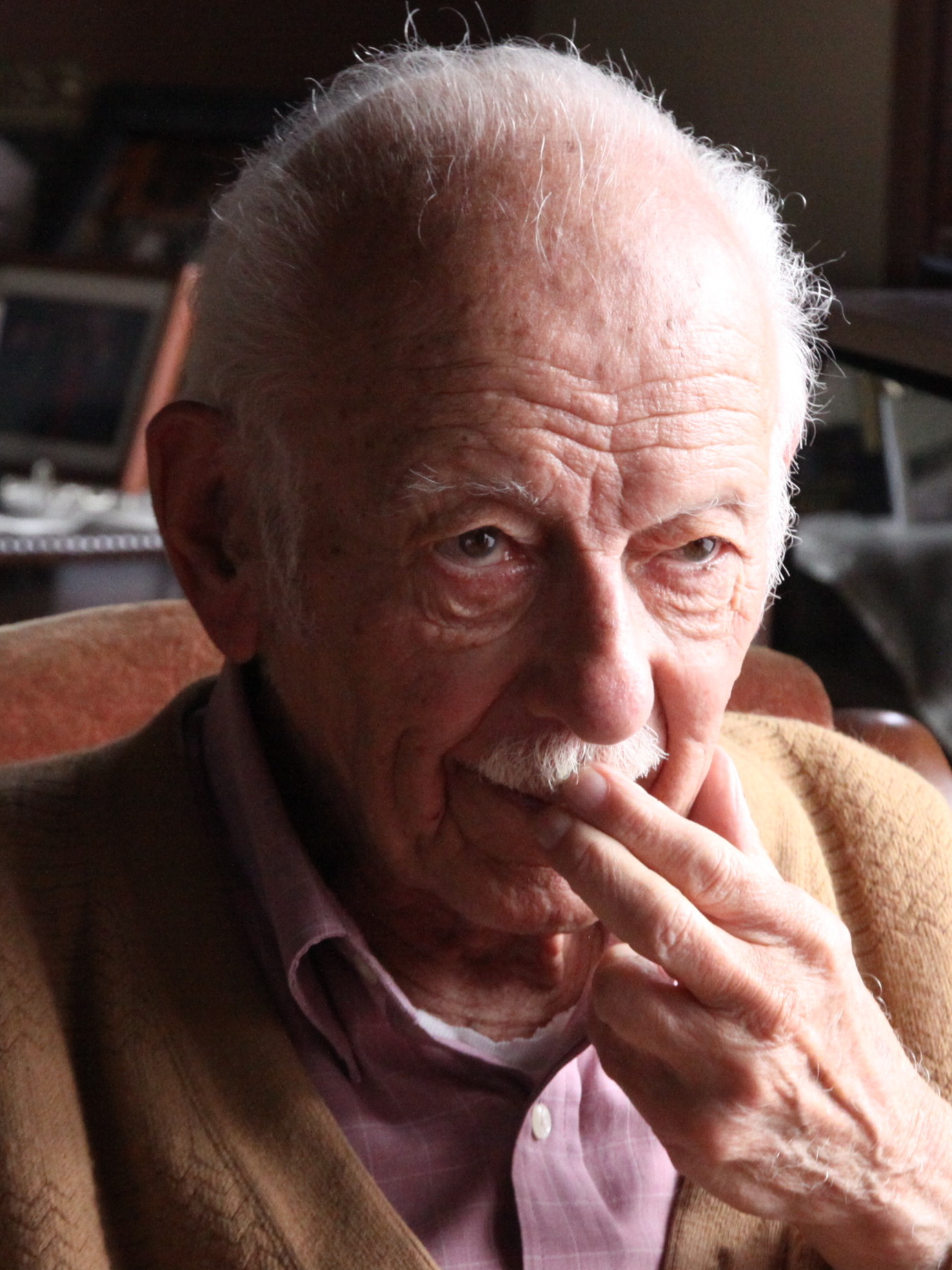

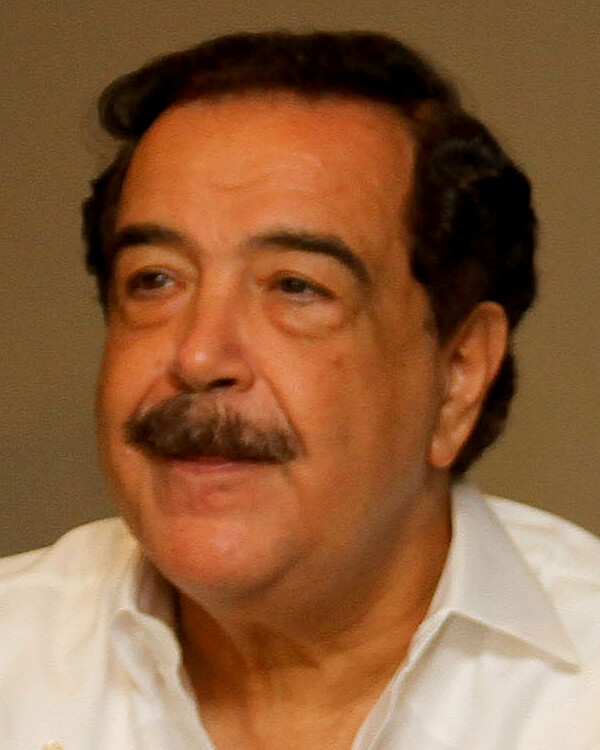
Nominee	Sixto Durán Ballén	Jaime Nebot
Party	PUR	PSC
Running mate	Alberto Dahik	Galo Vela Álvarez
Popular vote	2,146,762	1,598,707
Percentage	57.32%	42.68%
President before election
Rodrigo Borja Cevallos
ID
Elected President
Sixto Durán Ballén
Union Republican Party

General elections were held in Ecuador on 17 May 1992, with a second round of the presidential elections on 5 July. The presidential elections resulted in a victory for Sixto Durán Ballén of the Republican Union Party–Conservative Party alliance, who received 57.3% of the vote in the run-off. The Social Christian Party emerged as the largest party in the House of Representatives, winning 21 of the 77 seats.

== Results ==
=== President ===
Candidate	Running mate	Party	First round		Second round	
Candidate	Running mate	Party	Votes	%	Votes	%
Sixto Durán Ballén	Alberto Dahik	PUR–PCE	1,089,154	31.88	2,146,762	57.32
Jaime Nebot	Galo Vela	Social Christian Party	855,225	25.03	1,598,707	42.68
Abdalá Bucaram	Marco Proaño	Ecuadorian Roldosist Party	750,611	21.97		
Raúl Baca Carbo	Jorge Gallardo	Democratic Left	288,640	8.45		
Frank Vargas Pazzos	Alfredo Larrea	Ecuadorian Revolutionary Popular Action	107,804	3.16		
León Roldós	Alejandro Carrión	Socialist Party	88,255	2.58		
Fausto Moreno	Carlos Carrillo	Democratic People's Movement	66,507	1.95		
Vladimiro Álvarez	Reinaldo Yanchapaxi	Popular Democracy	64,611	1.89		
Averroes Bucaram	Patricio del Pozo	Concentration of People's Forces	45,768	1.34		
Bolívar Chiriboga	Zoila Laad	Ecuadorian Radical Liberal Party	32,816	0.96		
Gustavo Iturralde	Édison Fonseca	Broad Front of the Left	15,760	0.46		
Bolívar González	Wilson Drouet	Assad Bucaram Party	11,050	0.32		
Total			3,416,201	100.00	3,745,469	100.00
Valid votes			3,416,201	83.53	3,745,469	89.73
Invalid/blank votes			673,542	16.47	428,628	10.27
Total votes			4,089,743	100.00	4,174,097	100.00
Registered voters/turnout			5,710,363	71.62	5,710,363	73.10
Source: Nohlen

=== National Congress ===
Party	Nationwide		District		Seats	+/–
Party	Votes	%	Votes	%	Seats	+/–
Social Christian Party	753,452	23.39	742,165	23.17	21	+13
Republican Union Party	575,801	17.87	472,751	14.76	12	New
Ecuadorian Roldosist Party	486,498	15.10	513,248	16.03	13	+5
Democratic Left	313,415	9.73	289,816	9.05	7	–24
Conservative Party	193,654	6.01	271,096	8.46	6	+5
Democratic People's Movement	191,870	5.96	152,797	4.77	4	+2
Popular Democracy	171,073	5.31	231,163	7.22	5	–3
Socialist Party	130,558	4.05	134,779	4.21	3	–1
Concentration of People's Forces	120,607	3.74	78,630	2.46	1	–4
Alfarista Radical Front	109,419	3.40	114,849	3.59	1	–1
Ecuadorian Revolutionary Popular Action	48,833	1.52	46,673	1.46	1	+1
Ecuadorian Radical Liberal Party	45,982	1.43	60,773	1.90	2	+1
UDP–FADI	30,541	0.95	30,675	0.96	0	–2
National Liberation	28,888	0.90	31,645	0.99	1	New
People, Change, Democracy	20,773	0.64	14,630	0.46	0	0
Assad Bucaram Party			14,508	0.45	0	New
People's Party			2,594	0.08	0	0
Total	3,221,364	100.00	3,202,792	100.00	77	+5
Valid votes	3,221,364	79.40	3,202,792	78.96		
Invalid/blank votes	835,752	20.60	853,545	21.04		
Total votes	4,057,116	100.00	4,056,337	100.00		
Registered voters/turnout	5,710,363	71.05	5,710,363	71.03		
Source: Nohlen, TRAMA, OPLAL
