= 1988 Ecuadorian general election =

- Presidential election
- 31 January 1988 (first round); 8 May 1988 (second round)
- Registered: 4,679,684
- Turnout: 77.63% (first round); 77.70% (second round)
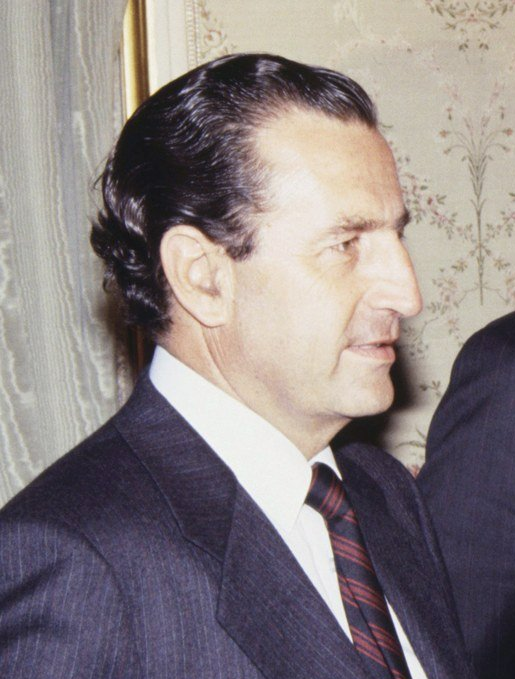

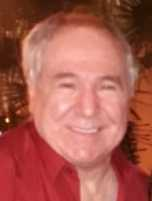
Nominee	Rodrigo Borja	Abdalá Bucaram
Party	ID	PRE
Running mate	Luis Parodi	Hugo Caicedo
Popular vote	1,700,648	1,448,498
Percentage	54.0%	46.0%
President before election
León Febres Cordero
PSC
Elected President
Rodrigo Borja Cevallos
ID

General elections were held in Ecuador on 31 January 1988, with a second round of the presidential elections on 8 May. Rodrigo Borja Cevallos of the Democratic Left won the presidential elections, receiving 54% of the vote in the second round, whilst the Democratic Left remained the largest faction in the National Congress, winning 31 of the 72 seats.

== Results ==
=== President ===
Candidate	Running mate	Party	First round		Second round	
Candidate	Running mate	Party	Votes	%	Votes	%
Rodrigo Borja Cevallos	Luis Parodi	Democratic Left	744,409	24.48	1,700,648	54.00
Abdalá Bucaram	Hugo Caicedo	Ecuadorian Roldosist Party	535,482	17.61	1,448,498	46.00
Sixto Durán Ballén	Pablo Baquerizo	Social Christian Party–Conservative Party	447,672	14.72		
Frank Vargas Pazzos	Enrique Ayala	APRE–PSE	384,189	12.63		
Jamil Mahuad	Juan José Pons	Popular Democracy	351,787	11.57		
Ángel Duarte Valverde	Teresa Minuche	Concentration of People's Forces	239,056	7.86		
Jaime Hurtado	Efraín Àlvarez	FADI–MPD	152,970	5.03		
Carlos Julio Emanuel	Pedro Arteta	Alfarista Radical Front	102,708	3.38		
Miguel Ángel Albornoz	Roberto Goldbaum	Ecuadorian Radical Liberal Party	48,970	1.61		
Guillermo Sotomayor	Leonardo Droira Canelos	Republican Party	33,734	1.11		
Total			3,040,977	100.00	3,149,146	100.00
Valid votes			3,040,977	83.71	3,149,146	87.17
Invalid/blank votes			591,865	16.29	463,489	12.83
Total votes			3,632,842	100.00	3,612,635	100.00
Registered voters/turnout			4,679,684	77.63	4,649,684	77.70
Source: Nohlen

=== National Congress ===
Party	Nationwide			District			Total seats	+/–
Party	Votes	%	Seats	Votes	%	Seats	Total seats	+/–
Democratic Left	601,409	21.76	3	635,590	22.70	28	31	+7
Ecuadorian Roldosist Party	449,653	16.27	2	456,524	16.31	6	8	+5
Social Christian Party	310,950	11.25	1	347,446	12.41	7	8	–1
Popular Democracy	294,362	10.65	1	304,294	10.87	7	8	+3
Concentration of People's Forces	194,723	7.05	1	226,172	8.08	4	5	–2
Conservative Party	193,533	7.00	1	55,986	2.00	0	1	–1
Broad Front of the Left	189,983	6.88	1	66,893	2.39	1	2	0
Alfarista Radical Front	147,071	5.32	1	110,168	3.94	1	2	–4
Socialist Party	137,853	4.99	1	120,458	4.30	3	4	+3
Ecuadorian Radical Liberal Party	97,405	3.52	0	76,380	2.73	1	1	–3
Democratic Party	69,763	2.52	0	55,783	1.99	0	0	–3
People, Change, Democracy	35,210	1.27	0	32,577	1.16	0	0	0
People's Party	22,788	0.82	0	11,829	0.42	0	0	New
Republican Party	18,671	0.68	0	15,354	0.55	0	0	New
Democratic People's Movement				163,562	5.84	2	2	–1
Ecuadorian Revolutionary Popular Action				120,445	4.30	0	0	0
Total	2,763,374	100.00	12	2,799,461	100.00	60	72	+2
Valid votes	2,763,374	76.72		2,799,461	77.53			
Invalid/blank votes	838,598	23.28		811,120	22.47			
Total votes	3,601,972	100.00		3,610,581	100.00			
Registered voters/turnout	4,649,684	77.47		4,649,684	77.65			
Source: Nohlen, Córdova
