= 1978–79 Ecuadorian general election =

- Presidential election
- 16 July 1978 (first round); 29 April 1979 (second round)
- Registered: 2,088,874
- Turnout: 75.46% (first round); 80.49% (second round)
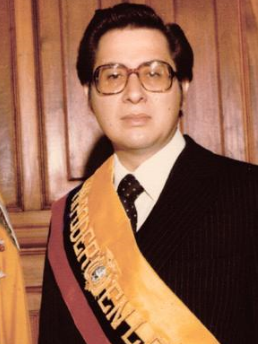

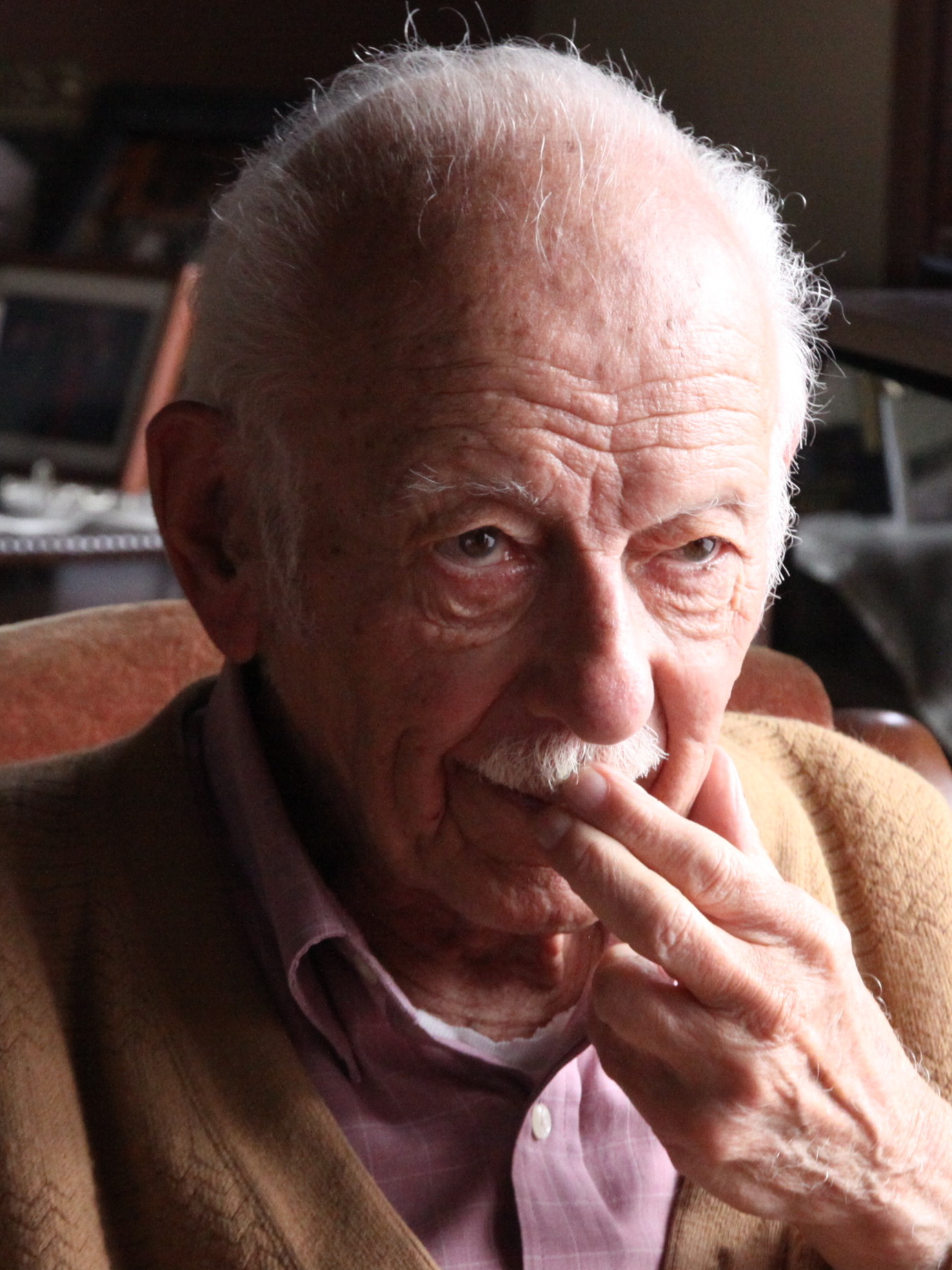
Nominee	Jaime Roldós Aguilera	Sixto Durán Ballén
Party	CFP	PSC
Running mate	Osvaldo Hurtado	José Icaza
Popular vote	1,025,148	471,657
Percentage	68.49%	31.51%
President before election
Alfredo Poveda
Nonpartisan
Elected President
Jaime Roldós Aguilera
CFP

General elections were held in Ecuador in 1978 and 1979. The first round of the presidential election was held on 16 July 1978, with a second round held alongside parliamentary elections on 29 April 1979. The presidential election was won by Jaime Roldós Aguilera of the Concentration of People's Forces (CPF), who received 68.5% of the vote in the run-off, becoming the country's first freely-elected president. The CPF emerged as the largest party in the National Congress, winning 29 of the 69 seats.

The incumbent military dictatorship barred Assad Bucaram, the popular leader of the CFP from being a candidate in the election.

The incumbent military dictatorship made attempts to prevent the transfer of power prior to the second round of the elections, including postponing it up to nine months after the first round was held.

== Results ==
=== President ===
Candidate	Running mate	Party	First round		Second round	
Candidate	Running mate	Party	Votes	%	Votes	%
Jaime Roldós Aguilera	Osvaldo Hurtado	Concentration of People's Forces	381,215	27.70	1,025,148	68.49
Sixto Durán Ballén	José Icaza	Social Christian Party	328,461	23.86	471,657	31.51
Raúl Clemente Huerta	Arsenio Vivanco	Ecuadorian Radical Liberal Party	311,983	22.67		
Rodrigo Borja Cevallos	Raúl Baca Carbo	Democratic Left	165,258	12.01		
Abdón Calderón	Edgar Molina	Alfarista Radical Front	124,347	9.03		
René Maugé	Aníbal Muñoz	Broad Front of the Left	65,187	4.74		
Total			1,376,451	100.00	1,496,805	100.00
Valid votes			1,376,451	87.32	1,496,805	89.03
Invalid/blank votes			199,915	12.68	184,481	10.97
Total votes			1,576,366	100.00	1,681,286	100.00
Registered voters/turnout			2,088,874	75.46	2,088,874	80.49
Source: Nohlen

=== National Congress ===
Party	Nationwide			District			Total seats
Party	Votes	%	Seats	Votes	%	Seats	Total seats
Concentration of People's Forces	445,229	30.94	4	454,910	31.73	25	29
Democratic Left	265,068	18.42	2	212,091	14.80	13	15
Social Christian Party	123,411	8.58	1	91,384	6.37	2	3
Ecuadorian Radical Liberal Party	115,110	8.00	1	138,456	9.66	3	4
Conservative Party	112,909	7.85	1	126,942	8.86	9	10
Revolutionary Nationalist Party	108,437	7.54	1	65,150	4.54	1	2
Democratic Institutionalist Coalition	90,277	6.27	1	85,835	5.99	2	3
Democratic People's Movement	68,982	4.79	1	70,590	4.92	0	1
People's Democratic Union	44,810	3.11	0	64,249	4.48	1	1
National Velasquista Federation	37,740	2.62	0	42,840	2.99	1	1
Socialist Party of Revolutionary People's Action	26,849	1.87	0	37,596	2.62	0	0
Ecuadorian Revolutionary Popular Action				43,483	3.03	0	0
Total	1,438,822	100.00	12	1,433,526	100.00	57	69
Valid votes	1,438,822	85.89		1,433,526	85.38		
Invalid/blank votes	236,373	14.11		245,398	14.62		
Total votes	1,675,195	100.00		1,678,924	100.00		
Registered voters/turnout	2,088,874	80.20		2,088,874	80.37		
Source: Nohlen, IPU

==== List of elected representatives ====
Name	Party	Constituency
Alejandro Carrión Pérez	ID	Pichincha
Antonio Arnulfo Andrade Fajardo	CFP	Los Ríos
Arnaldo Merino Muñoz	ID	Chimborazo
Arquímides Valdez Carcelén	CFP	National
Arturo Córdova Malo	ID	Guayas
Assad Bucaram	CFP	National
Augusto Cid Abad Prado	ID	Morona Santiago
Aurelio Carrera del Río	PNR	Guayas
Carlos Julio Arosemena Monroy	PNR	National
César Gustavo Valdivieso Egas	CFP	Zamora Chinchipe
Edgar Orbea Rubio	CFP	Cotopaxi
Edgar Vicente Garrido Jaramillo	CFP	Loja
Eduardo Rivas Ayora	CFP	Cañar
Eudoro Bienvenido Loor Rivadeneira	PLRE	Manabí
Ezequiel Clavijo Martínez	PCE	Cañar
Fausto Vallejo Escobar	CFP	Chimborazo
Francisco Leónidas Daza Palacios	CFP	Manabí
Gabriel Nicola Loor	CFP	Los Ríos
Gabriel Olmedo Arroba Espinoza	CFP	Guayas
Galo Pico Mantilla	PCE	Tungurahua
Galo Vayas Salazar	CFP	Pichincha
Gil Barragán Romero	CID	Pichincha
Gilberto Francisco Plaza Chillambo	CFP	Esmeraldas
Gonzalo Gallegos	ID	Tungurahua
Gonzalo González Real	CFP	Bolívar
Gualberto Sigifredo Ortiz	PCE	Bolívar
Harry Abdón Álvarez García	ID	El Oro
Héctor Ricardo Bowen Cavagnaro	FNV	Manabí
Heinz Rodolfo Moeller Freile	CID	Guayas
Jacinto Velázquez Herrera	PSC	Guayas
Jaime del Castillo	PLRE	Pichincha
Jaime Hurtado	MPD	National
Jorge Chiriboga Guerrero	UDP	Esmeraldas
Jorge Milton Fadul Suazo	CFP	El Oro
Jorge Zambrano García	CFP	Manabí
José Enrique Ponce Luque	PSC	Los Ríos
José Miguel Mosquera Murillo	CFP	National
Juan Manuel Real	CFP	Tungurahua
Juan Tama Márquez	CFP	Azuay
Julio Arturo Piedra Armijos	PCE	Loja
Julio Ayala Serra	CFP	Guayas
Julio César Trujillo Vásquez	CFP	Pichincha
León Febres Cordero	PSC	National
Leopoldo Severo Espinoza Valdivieso	PCE	Azuay
Luis Antonio Gavilánez Villagómez	CFP	Guayas
Luis Alfredo Mejía Montesdeoca	ID	Imbabura
Luis Barrezueta Erazo	ID	Galápagos
Luis Muñoz Herrería	ID	Imbabura
Manuel Córdova Galarza	ID	Pichincha
Marco Proaño Maya	CFP	Imbabura
Maximiliano Rosero Sánchez	CFP	Cotopaxi
Medardo Alfonso Mora Solórzano	PLRE	Manabí
Nelson Félix Navarrete	CFP	Napo
Otto Arosemena	CID	National
Pablo Dávalos Dillon	PCE	Chimborazo
Pedro Carlos Falquez Batallas	CFP	El Oro
Pío Oswaldo Cueva Puertas	PCE	Loja
Rafael Armijos Valdivieso	PCE	National
Rafael Márquez Moreno	CFP	National
Raúl Clemente Huerta Rendón	PLRE	National
Raúl Baca Carbo	ID	National
Reinaldo Yanchapaxi Cando	PCE	Cotopaxi
Rodolfo Luis Baquerizo Nazur	CFP	Guayas
Rodrigo Edmundo Suárez Morales	PCE	Carchi
Rodrigo Borja	ID	National
Segundo Eladio Salas Meza	CFP	Esmeraldas
Vilem Kubes Weingart	ID	Pastaza
Wilfrido Lucero Bolaños	ID	Carchi
Xavier Ledesma Ginatta	ID	Guayas
Source: Almanaque Ecuador total 1996
