= 2006 Ecuadorian general election =

General election held in Ecuador

- Presidential election
- 15 October 2006 (first round); 26 November 2006 (second round)
- Registered: 9,165,125
- Turnout: 71.46% (first round); 75.93% (second round)
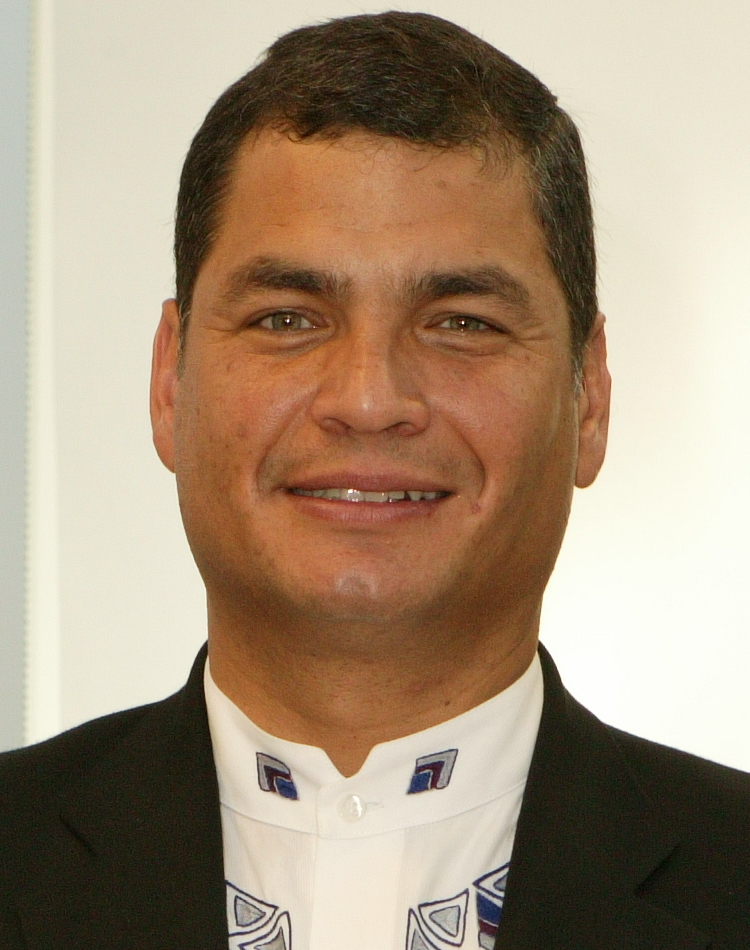

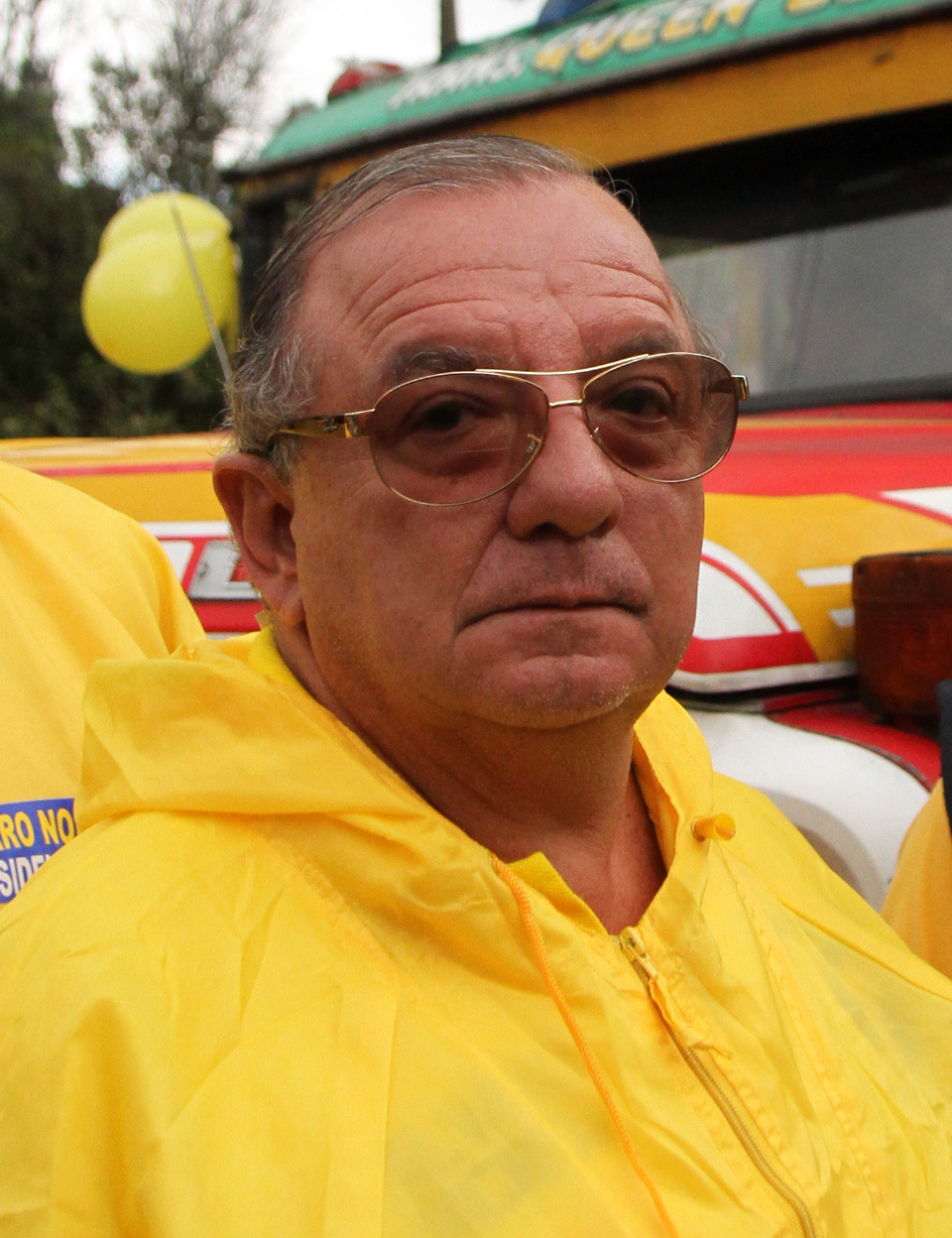
Nominee	Rafael Correa	Álvaro Noboa
Party	PAIS Alliance	PRIAN
Running mate	Lenín Moreno	Vicente Taiano
Popular vote	3,517,635	2,689,418
Percentage	56.67%	43.33%
President before election
Alfredo Palacio
Independent
Elected President
Rafael Correa
PAIS Alliance

General elections were held in Ecuador on 15 October 2006 to elect a new President and National Congress.

As no presidential candidate received a majority of the vote in the first round, a run-off was held on 26 November, which was won by Rafael Correa of the PAIS Alliance.

== Run-off ==
On 28 November 2006, Correa was declared the winner, although Noboa did not accept defeat, and suggested that he might challenge the validity of the ballot.

According to the Supreme Electoral Tribunal (TSE), out of 97.29% of the votes counted, 57.07% were for Correa and 42.96% for Noboa. Among others, the Organization of American States, US ambassador Linda Jewell, and representatives of many South American countries have recognised Correa as the winner of the election. However, as of 29 November 2006, Álvaro Noboa had still not admitted defeat.

Rafael Correa was duly sworn in as president for a four-year term on 15 January 2007.

== Opinion polls ==
=== First round ===
Date	Pollster	Noboa	Correa	Gutierrez	Roldós	Viteri	Macas	Rosero	Proaño
20/02/06	Consultar	–	–	–	29%	–	–	–	–
20/02/06	S.P. Investigaciones	–	–	–	26%	–	–	–	–
20/02/06	CEDATOS	13%	–	–	21%	–	–	–	–
09/03/06	Perfiles de Opinión	16%	–	–	22%	9.5%	–	–	–
09/03/06	Datanálisis	15.3%	–	–	27.4%	9.5%	–	–	–
31/03/06	CEDATOS	8%	6%	–	22%	13%	–	–	5%
05/04/06	CEDATOS	17%	7%	–	22%	9%	–	–	–
05/05/06	CEDATOS	14%	9%	–	23%	14%	–	–	–
29/05/06	Informe Confidencial	16%	7%	–	22%	13%	–	–	–
28/08/06	Market	–	10.8%	–	24.6%	13%	–	–	–
06/09/06	Market	–	12%	–	23.6%	13%	–	–	–
06/09/06	CEDATOS	–	12%	–	26%	17%		–	–
06/09/06	Informe Confidencial	–	14%	–	19%	15%	–	–	–
16/09/06	Informe Confidencial	9%	22%	4%	20%	9%	–	4%	2%
19/09/06	CEDATOS	10%	19%	3%	20%	13%	1%	2%	2%
24/09/06	CEDATOS	4%	33%	4%	22%	13%	1%	2%	1%
14/10/06	CEDATOS	25.2%	31.1%	–	19.1%	11.5%	–	–	–
14/10/06	Market	27%	28.4%	–	18.4	–	–	–	–
15/10/06	CEDATOS	27.2%	25.4%	15%	13.6%	10.8%	–	–	–
15/10/06	Informe Confidencial	28.53%	26.51%	14.95%	15.59%	9.23%	–	–	–
15/10/06	Market	28.23%	27.2%	13%	14.42%	9.95%	–	–	–

=== Second round ===
Date	Pollster	Correa	Noboa
20/10/06	Consultar	28%	50%
26/10/06	Informe Confidencial	42%	58%
29/10/06	Informe Confidencial	32%	47%
04/11/06	Market	30%	49%
04/11/06	CEDATOS	34%	49%
05/11/06	Consultar	34%	49%
16/11/06	CEDATOS	48%	52%
17/11/06	CEDATOS	38%	41%
18/11/06	Market	41%	37%
24/11/06	CEDATOS	52%	48%
26/11/06	CEDATOS	56%	43%
26/11/06	Market	56.8%	43.2%

== Results ==
=== President ===
Candidate	Running mate	Party	First round		Second round	
Candidate	Running mate	Party	Votes	%	Votes	%
Álvaro Noboa	Lenín Moreno	Institutional Renewal Party of National Action	1,464,251	26.83	2,689,418	43.33
Rafael Correa	Vicente Taiano	PAIS Alliance/PS-FA	1,246,333	22.84	3,517,635	56.67
Gilmar Gutiérrez	Leonardo Escobar	January 21 Patriotic Society Party	950,895	17.42		
León Roldós Aguilera	Ramiro González	Democratic Left	809,754	14.84		
Cynthia Viteri	Ernesto Dávalos	Social Christian Party	525,728	9.63		
Luis Macas	César Sacoto	Pachakutik Plurinational Unity Movement – New Country	119,577	2.19		
Fernando Rosero	Susy Mendoza	Ecuadorian Roldosist Party	113,323	2.08		
Marco Proaño Maya	Galo Cabanilla	Movimiento de Reivindicación Democrática	77,655	1.42		
Luis Villacís	César Buelva	Democratic People's Movement	72,762	1.33		
Jaime Damerval	Lida Moreno	Concentration of People's Forces	25,284	0.46		
Marcelo Larrea Cabrera	Miguel Morán	Third Republic Alliance	23,233	0.43		
Lenin Torres	María Pareja	Revolutionary Movement of Popular Participation	15,357	0.28		
Carlos Sagnay de la Bastida	Jeannette Benavides	Alfarista National Integration	13,455	0.25		
Total			5,457,607	100.00	6,207,053	100.00
Valid votes			5,457,607	83.33	6,207,053	89.19
Invalid/blank votes			1,092,070	16.67	752,179	10.81
Total votes			6,549,677	100.00	6,959,232	100.00
Registered voters/turnout			9,165,125	71.46	9,165,125	75.93
Source: CNE

=== National Congress ===
Party	Votes	%	Seats
Institutional Renewal Party of National Action	868,650	27.80	28
January 21 Patriotic Society Party	579,775	18.56	23
Social Christian Party	477,804	15.29	13
Democratic Left –Ethics and Democracy Network	332,497	10.64	13
Ecuadorian Roldosist Party	239,325	7.66	6
Democratic People's Movement	126,188	4.04	3
Pachakutik Plurinational Unity Movement – New Country	118,754	3.80	6
Christian Democratic Union	81,600	2.61	5
New Country Civic Movement	19,568	0.63	1
Regional Action for Equality	11,188	0.36	1
Other parties	268,882	8.61	0
Overseas seat			1
Total	3,124,231	100.00	100
Valid votes	3,124,231	58.34	
Invalid/blank votes	2,230,675	41.66	
Total votes	5,354,906	100.00	
Registered voters/turnout	9,020,773	59.36	
Source: IFES, Psephos
