= Rodrigo Borja Cevallos =

President of Ecuador from 1988 to 1992

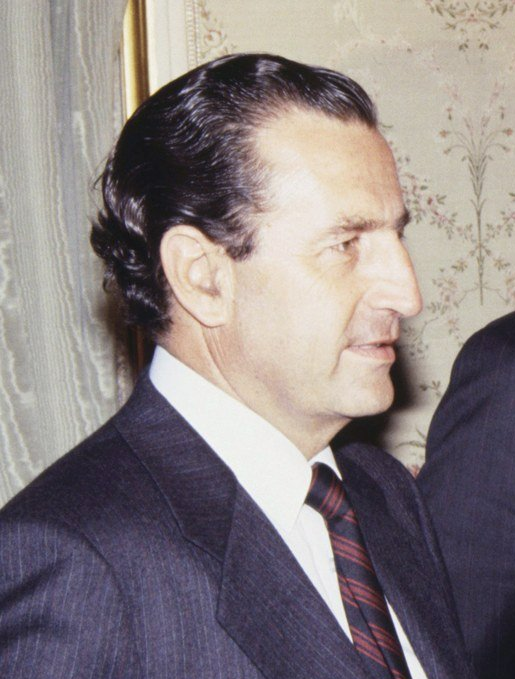
- Borja in 1989

36th President of Ecuador
- In office 10 August 1988 – 10 August 1992
- Vice President: Luis Parodi Valverde
- Preceded by: León Febres Cordero
- Succeeded by: Sixto Durán Ballén

Personal details
- Born: Rodrigo Borja Cevallos; 19 June 1935 Quito, Ecuador
- Died: 18 December 2025 (aged 90) Quito, Ecuador
- Party: Democratic Left
- Spouse: Carmen Calisto (m. 1966)
- Children: 4
- Education: Central University of Ecuador

Rodrigo Borja Cevallos (19 June 1935 – 18 December 2025) was an Ecuadorian politician, jurist, and academic who served as president of Ecuador from 1988 to 1992. He was also a descendant of the House of Borgia.

His presidency was marked by the implementation of austerity measures to overcome an economic crisis, the disarmament of the guerrilla group ¡Alfaro Vive, Carajo!, dialogue with Peru to resolve the border conflict, Ecuador's active role in promoting regional integration, and recognition of indigenous nationalities.

== Early life ==
Borja was born in Quito, Ecuador, on 19 June 1935 and grew up in the historic La Chilena neighborhood. He was the son of Luis Felipe Borja del Alcázar and Aurelia Cevallos Gangotena. He was a male-line descendant of Pope Alexander VI through his son Giovanni Borgia, 2nd Duke of Gandia.

He studied at the Colegio Pensionado Borja and the Colegio Americano de Quito. In 1958, he obtained a degree in Political and Social Sciences from the Central University of Ecuador, and in 1960, Borja obtained a doctorate in Jurisprudence. During his time as a student, Borja chaired the UCE School Law Association and worked as a journalist for HCJB radio and the El Comercio newspaper.

== Political career ==
Borja had political concerns from a young age and, in the 1950s, he joined the Ecuadorian Radical Liberal Party (PL) and was a prominent student voice against Camilo Ponce Enríquez's government.

He was elected member of the Congress in the 1962 parliamentary election for PL, an office he held until the 1963 coup d'état. After the coup, Borja devoted himself to teaching political science at the Central University. Once the military junta fell three years later, in 1966 Borja was elected a member of the Special Commission of Lawyers that had the task of attending the Constituent Assembly, which was elected on October 1966.

In 1967, once parliamentary elections had been announced for 1968, Borja and other young militants left the PL with the intention of creating a non-Marxist left-wing party. In 1968, he founded the Democratic Left party as an opposition party to the government of José María Velasco Ibarra. In the late 1960s, Borja traveled to Sweden, where he met Olof Palme.

In 1970, he was re-elected to Congress, although he was unable to take up his seat after Congress was suspended a few days later. He also opposed the military regime of Guillermo Rodríguez Lara. In 1978, after the new Constitution was approved, Borja was able to register the party and ran as a candidate in the presidential election that July.

In those elections, Borja obtained 12% of the vote and came in fourth place, but was re-elected as a deputy. During Jaime Roldós Aguilera's administration, Borja supported the president in parliament, albeit with limitations. Borja ran again in the 1984 presidential elections, at a time when the polls were very favorable to his candidacy, and he formed an alliance with Pueblo, Cambio y Democracia (PCD). His vice-presidential candidate was Aquiles Rigaíl. Borja won the first round, but in the second round León Febres Cordero won and was elected president but ID rose to become the leader of the parliamentary opposition until it won the 1986 parliamentary by-elections.

=== President of Ecuador (1988–1992) ===
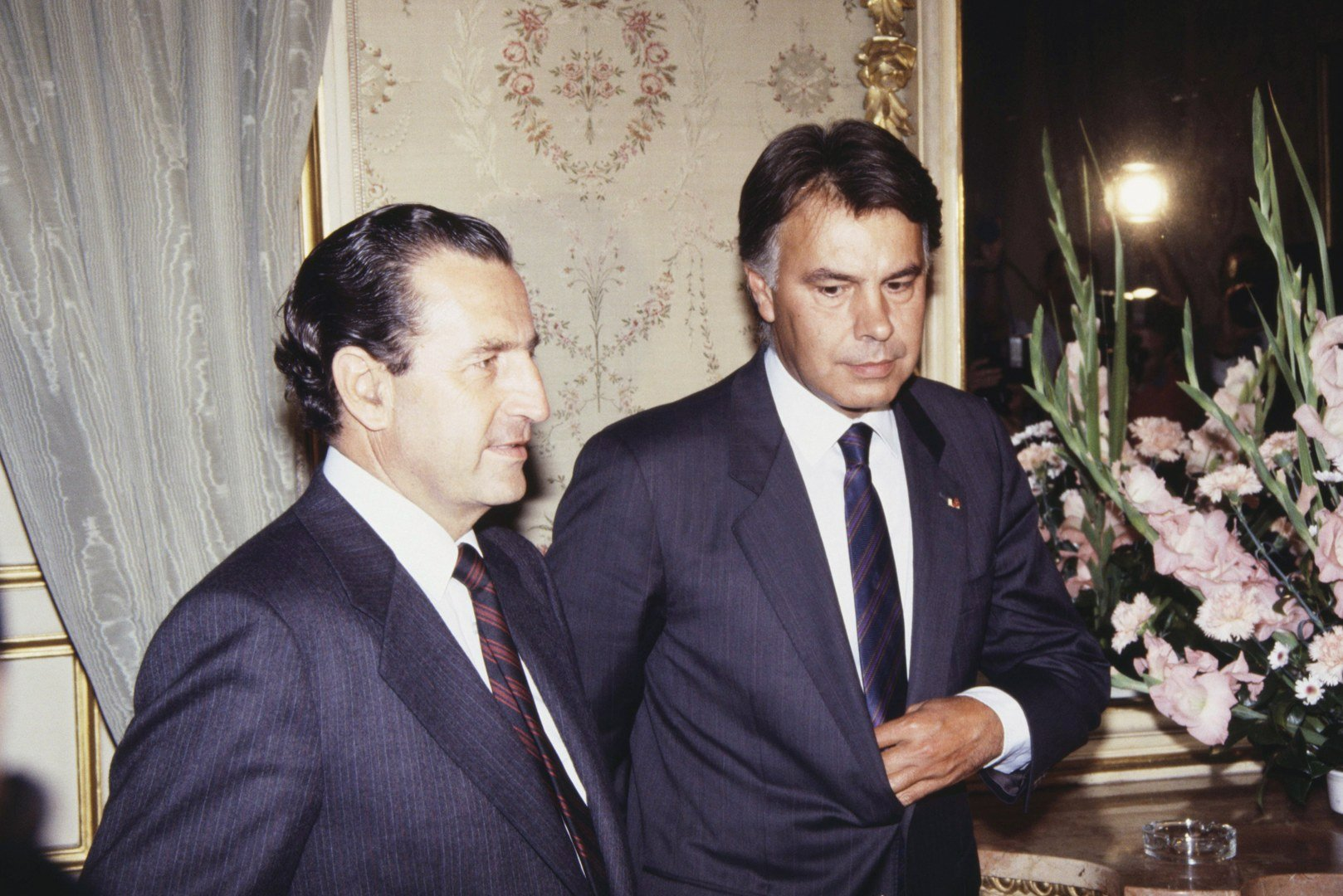
President Rodrigo Borja with Spanish Prime Minister Felipe González in Madrid, 12 September 1989

In 1987, Borja ran in the Democratic Left primaries, which he won against Raúl Baca Carbo. Borja won the 1988 presidential election with 54% of the vote and broad support from both right-wing and left-wing parties, despite a fierce campaign by his rival, Abdalá Bucaram, in which he was constantly subjected to insults and verbal abuse.

Borja was sworn in on 10 August 1988, succeeding Febres Cordero. Latin American leaders such as Fidel Castro, and the Portuguese President Mário Soares, and Spanish Deputy Prime Minister Alfonso Guerra attended his inauguration. He formed a coalition government with the Christian Democratic Union.

Borja had inherited from the previous administration, as he stated, “economic and moral bankruptcy", so he focused on Ecuador's economic problems during his presidency. Therefore, at the beginning of his term, he had to develop an economic plan with stabilization and austerity measures. Rising inflation and economic reforms meant that during his term in office, Borja had to deal with four general strikes called by trade unions, student protests, and demonstrations by indigenous groups. In response to the historic protest by Confederation of Indigenous Nationalities of Ecuador in June 1990, Borja handed over one milion hectares of property titles to indigenous representatives from the Amazon region in May 1992. He also implemented a bilingual education system and recognized indigenous nationalities.

In international relations, Borja's presidency was notable for the restoration of diplomatic relations with Nicaragua, which had been broken off in 1984, Ecuador's active participation in the establishment of the Andean Pact, as he was an advocate of political and economic integration in Latin America, and the dialogue with Peruvian President Alberto Fujimori on the Amazon border dispute. On this last issue, together with his foreign minister Diego Cordovez Zegers, Borja proposed the mediation of Pope John Paul II, although this did not end up being possible after the change of government in Ecuador. He spent time with U.S. President George H. W. Bush on 22 and 23 July 1990, even playing tennis with him. The two met again on 26 February 1992, at a drug policy conference.

Under his presidency, the guerrilla-terrorist group ¡Alfaro Vive, Carajo! agreed to renounce armed struggle and surrendered its weapons after a process that lasted from 1989 to 1991, and he ordered the release of General Frank Vargas Pazzos, who had attempted a coup in 1986. However, Ecuador also became a new center for cocaine processing and distribution, and impunity for criminal activities worsened. In 1989, he founded Petroecuador.

Borja developed an important literacy program under the Monsignor Leonidas Proaño National Literacy Campaign, which ran from 1988 to 1990 and achieved the literacy of at least 70,000 young students and 180.000 adults.

In the early 1990s, he had to deal with a major cholera epidemic throughout the country.

Starting in 1990, the economic situation began to recover, but several political crises led to the Democratic Left's loss in the 1992 legislative elections. One of those crises occurred when, a month before the elections, he declared Congress “morally dissolved” after it failed to pass the Monetary Regime Bill. That declaration, which took place five days after Fujimori's self-coup in Peru, raised fears of a coup attempt by Borja.

Constitutionally limited to one term, Borja was succeeded by Sixto Durán-Ballén on 10 August 1992, who had won that year's presidential elections.

== Later life ==
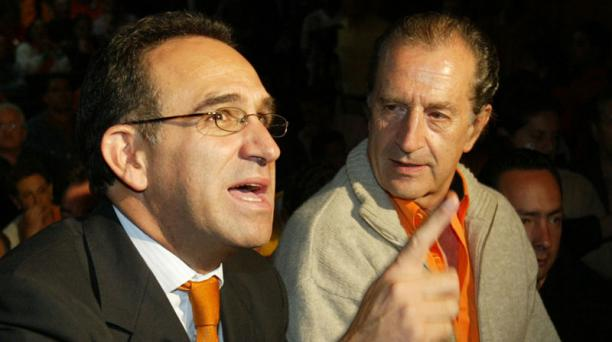
Rodrigo Borja (right) with Ramiro González, 2004

Reelection was allowed after a 1994 referendum and he ran for President in 1998, receiving 12% of the vote and coming in third place, and again ran for president in 2002, receiving 14% of the vote and fourth place.

He was a strong critic of Lucio Gutiérrez and Abdalá Bucaram's presidencies.

After leaving politics in 2003, he devoted himself to teaching, managing the "Encyclopedia of Politics", and giving lectures around the world.

In 2007, Borja was appointed Secretary General of the Union of South American Nations. However, he resigned the following year after disagreeing with several regional leaders on the scope of integration, as Borja advocated for a UNASUR with a solid institutional structure and broad powers.

On 29 April 2010, Borja joined the Ecuadorian Academy of Language, occupying seat F.

== Personal life and death ==
In December 1966, he married Carmen Calisto. They had four children. One of his grandsons is Ecuadorian-American racing driver Juan Manuel Correa.

He was fond of sports, especially athletics, tennis, and car racing.

Borja died in Quito on 18 December 2025, at the age of 90. The government decreed three days of national mourning between 19 and 21 December. The funeral chapel was set up on 19 December in the Crystal Palace in Itchimbía Park in Quito. The funeral took place there the following day, attended by authorities such as Vice President María José Pinto.

== Honors ==
- Collar of the Order of Isabella the Catholic (Spain, 1989)

Political offices
Preceded by León Febres Cordero	36th President of Ecuador; 10 August 1988 – 10 August 1992	Succeeded by Sixto Durán Ballén
