= 1986 Ecuadorian parliamentary election =

Parliamentary elections were held in Ecuador on 4 June 1986. Only the 59 district members of the House of Representatives were elected. The Democratic Left emerged as the largest party, winning 14 of the 59 seats.

== Results ==
Party	Votes	%	Seats
Democratic Left	349,825	14.48	14
Social Christian Party	304,671	12.61	12
Concentration of People's Forces	228,126	9.44	6
Popular Democracy	226,297	9.37	4
Ecuadorian Roldosist Party	218,319	9.04	3
Ecuadorian Radical Liberal Party	204,336	8.46	3
Democratic People's Movement	176,461	7.31	3
Broad Front of the Left	146,466	6.06	2
Alfarista Radical Front	136,531	5.65	3
Democratic Party	112,337	4.65	1
Socialist Party	106,017	4.39	6
Ecuadorian Revolutionary Popular Action	58,421	2.42	0
People, Change, Democracy	55,446	2.30	1
Revolutionary Nationalist Party	44,841	1.86	0
Conservative Party	33,677	1.39	1
Republican National Coalition	13,621	0.56	0
Total	2,415,392	100.00	59
Valid votes	2,415,392	76.69	
Invalid/blank votes	734,298	23.31	
Total votes	3,149,690	100.00	
Registered voters/turnout	4,255,346	74.02	
Source: Nohlen
