= List of presidents of the National Congress of Ecuador =

The president of the National Congress was the presiding officer of the legislature of Ecuador from 1979 to 2009.

== Unicameral Congress 1831–1834 ==
Presidents of the Congress	Took office	Left office
Modesto Larrea y Carrión	September 1831	October 1831
Manuel Matheu y Herrera	October 1831	October 1831
Salvador Ortega Estacio	August 1832	November 1832
Francisco de Marcos y Crespo	September 1833	October 1833

== Bicameral Congress 1837-1970 ==
Presidents of the Senate	Took office	Left office
Juan José Flores	January 1837	April 1837
José Fernández Salvador López, Diego Noboa y Arteta, Pedro José de Arteta	January 1839	April 1839
José Félix Valdivieso y Valdivieso	January 1841	March 1841
Vicente Rocafuerte, Ángel Tola y Salcedo	September 1846	November 1846
Antonio Elizalde Lamar	September 1847	November 1847
Diego Noboa y Arteta	September 1848	November 1848
José Fernández Salvador López	November 1848	November 1848
Modesto Larrea y Carrión	September 1849	November 1849
Manuel Bustamante del Mazo	August 1853	December 1853
Manuel Gómez de la Torre y Gangotena	September 1854	December 1854
Manuel Bustamante del Mazo	September 1855	November 1855
Vidal Alvarado Espinosa	September 1856	November 1856
Manuel Bustamante del Mazo	September 1857	November 1858
Manuel Gómez de la Torre y Gangotena	August 1863	October 1863
Juan Aguirre Montúfar	March 1864	April 1864
Nicolás Espinosa Rivadeneira	September 1865	November 1865
Pedro Carbo y Noboa	August 1867	November 1867
Manuel Angulo y Martínez de la Vega	January 1868	January 1868
José María de Santistevan y Plaza	August 1871	October 1871
Roberto de Ascásubi y Matheu	August 1873	October 1873
Rafael Pólit	August 1875	October 1875
Julio Sáenz Salvador	October 1875	December 1875
Leopoldo Fernández Salvador y Valdivieso	August 1880	November 1880
Luis Cordero Crespo	June 1885	August 1885
Juan León Mera	June 1886	August 1886
Camilo Ponce Ortiz	June 1887	August 1887
Agustín Guerrero Lizarzaburu, Camilo Ponce Ortiz	June 1888	August 1888
Agustín Guerrero Lizarzaburu	August 1888	September 1888
Pedro Ignacio Lizarzaburu y Borja	May 1890	August 1890
Vicente Lucio Salazar	June 1892	September 1892
Elías Lasso Acosta	June 1894	August 1894
Carlos Matheus Pacheco	August 1894	August 1894
Manuel Ángel Larrea Donoso	August 1898	November 1898
Luis Adriano Dillon Reyna	July 1899	October 1899
Manuel Benigno Cueva Betancourt	August 1900	October 1901
Aurelio Noboa Baquerizo	August 1902	October 1903
Carlos Freile Zaldumbide	August 1904	October 1904
José Luis Tamayo	August 1905	October 1905
Abelardo Moncayo Jijón	August 1908	October 1908
Genaro Larrea Vela	October 1908	November 1908
Bartolomé Huerta Gómez de Urrea	August 1909	November 1909
Lino Cardenas Proaño	June 1910	July 1910
Carlos Freile Zaldumbide	August 1910	October 1911
Alfredo Baquerizo Moreno	August 1912	October 1915
Miguel E. Seminario Marticorena	August 1916	October 1917
Gonzalo Córdova	August 1918	October 1918
Julio Burbano Aguirre	August 1919	October 1919
José Julián Andrade Bastidas	August 1920	October 1922
Alberto Guerrero Martínez	August 1923	October 1924
Alfredo Baquerizo Moreno	August 1930	December 1930
Alberto Acosta Soberón	August 1931	December 1931
Alberto Guerrero Martínez	August 1932	December 1932
José Rafael Bustamante	December 1932	December 1932
José Vicente Trujillo	August 1933	November 1934
Enrique Baquerizo Moreno	November 1934	December 1934
Carlos Alberto Arroyo del Río	August 1935	September 1935
Carlos Alberto Arroyo del Río	February 1939	August 1940
Julio Enrique Moreno	August 1940	February 1942
Miguel Ángel Albornoz Tabares	August 1942	October 1943
Manuel Agustín Aguirre Ríos	December 1945	December 1945
José Rafael Bustamante	September 1947	September 1947
Manuel Sotomayor	August 1948	October 1949
Abel Gilbert	August 1950	November 1951
Alfredo Chiriboga	August 1952	November 1955
Francisco Illingworth	August 1956	November 1959
Carlos Julio Arosemena Monroy	August 1960	November 1961
Reinaldo Varea	November 1961	November 1962
Gonzalo Cordero Crespo	November 1967	December 1967
Juan Illingworth Baquerizo	August 1968	May 1970

Presidents of the Chamber of Deputies	Took office	Left office
José María Santistevan	January 1837	April 1837
Vicente Flor Eguez, Juan Manuel Benítez, Antonio Bustamante, Atanasio Carrión	January 1839	April 1839
José Pío de Escudero	January 1841	March 1841
Roberto de Ascásubi	September 1846	November 1846
Manuel Gómez de la Torre	September 1847	November 1847
José Manuel Jijón	September 1848	November 1848
Antonio Mata Martínez	November 1848	November 1848
José María Urvina	September 1849	November 1849
Nicolás Espinosa	August 1853	December 1853
Vicente Flor	September 1854	December 1854
Juan Bautista Vásquez	September 1855	November 1855
Pablo Herrera González	September 1856	November 1856
Pablo Guevara	September 1857	November 1857
Pablo Bustamante	September 1858	November 1858
Juan Bautista Vásquez	August 1863	October 1863
Elías Lasso	March 1864	April 1864
Francisco León Franco	September 1865	November 1865
Camilo Ponce Ortiz	August 1867	November 1867
Antonio Portilla	January 1868	January 1868
Francisco Arboleda	August 1871	October 1871
Vicente Lucio Salazar	August 1873	October 1873
Pablo Bustamante	August 1875	December 1875
Juan Ignacio Moreno, Napoleón Aguirre	August 1880	November 1880
Juan Bautista Vásquez	June 1885	August 1885
Julio Castro	June 1886	August 1886
Aparicio Rivadeneira	June 1887	August 1887
Remigio Crespo Toral	June 1888	August 1888
Federico Rivera	August 1888	September 1888
Carlos Matheus	May 1890	August 1890
Santiago Carrasco	June 1892	September 1892
Carlos Casares	June 1894	August 1894
José Luis Tamayo	August 1898	November 1898
Carlos Freile Zaldumbide	July 1899	October 1899
José Luis Tamayo	October 1899	October 1899
Leónidas Plaza	August 1900	October 1900
Abelardo Posso	October 1901	October 1901
José Julián Andrade, Miguel Ángel Carbo	August 1902	October 1903
Modesto Peñaherrera	August 1904	October 1905
Abelardo Montalvo	August 1908	August 1911
Francisco Andrade Marín	October 1911	October 1911
Julio Enrique Fernández	August 1912	October 1912
Manuel E. Escudero, Luis Antonio Pallares	August 1913	October 1913
Agustín Cabezas	August 1914	October 1914
Manuel Cabeza de Vaca	August 1915	October 1915
Miguel Ángel Albornoz	August 1916	October 1917
Manuel María Sánchez	August 1918	October 1918
Pacífico Villagómez	August 1919	October 1919
Luis Vernaza, Juan de Dios Martínez	August 1920	October 1921
Carlos Alberto Arroyo del Río	August 1922	October 1923
Ricardo Villavicencio Ponce	August 1924	October 1924
Manuel A. Navarro	August 1930	December 1931
José María Velasco Ibarra	August 1932	December 1932
Fausto Navarro Allende	December 1932	December 1932
Guillermo Ramos	August 1933	September 1935
Andrés Córdova	February 1939	August 1940
José Ramón Boloña	August 1940	February 1942
Alfredo Sevilla	August 1942	October 1942
Teodoro Maldonado Carbo	August 1943	October 1943
Manuel Elicio Flor Torres	December 1945	December 1945
Carlos Andrade Marín Malo	September 1947	October 1948
Augusto Alvarado Olea	August 1949	November 1949
Ruperto Alarcón Falconí	August 1950	November 1950
Daniel Córdova Toral	August 1951	November 1951
Carlos Julio Arosemena Monroy, Rafael Arízaga Vega	August 1952	November 1952
José Baquero de la Calle	August 1953	February 1954
Gonzalo Cordero Crespo	August 1954	November 1954
Manuel Jijón Caamaño y Flores	August 1955	November 1956
Otto Arosemena Gómez	August 1957	November 1958
Manuel Jijón Caamaño y Flores	August 1959	November 1959
Manuel Araujo Hidalgo, Nicolás Valdano Raffo	August 1960	November 1961
Aurelio Dávila Cajas	November 1961	December 1961
Jaime Acosta Velasco	August 1962	November 1962
Julio Estupiñan Tello	November 1967	December 1967
Raúl Clemente Huerta Rendón	August 1968	May 1970

== Unicameral Congress 1979–2007 ==
The legislature was called Chamber of Representatives from 1979 to 1984, and National Congress from 1984 to 2009. Below is the list of office-holders 1979—2007:

Presidents of the National Congress	Party	Took office	Left office
Assad Bucaram	Concentration of People's Forces	August 1979	August 1980
Raúl Baca Carbo	Democratic Left	August 1980	August 1982
Rodolfo Baquerizo	Concentration of People's Forces	August 1982	August 1983
Gary Esparza	PCD	August 1983	August 1984
Raúl Baca Carbo	Democratic Left	August 1984	August 1985
Averroes Bucaram	Concentration of People's Forces	August 1985	August 1986
Andrés Vallejo	Democratic Left	August 1986	August 1987
Jorge Zavala	Democratic Left	August 1987	August 1988
Wilfrido Lucero	Christian Democratic Union	August 1988	August 1990
Averroes Bucaram	Concentration of People's Forces	August 1990	October 1990
Edelberto Bonilla	Ecuadorian Radical Liberal Party	October 1990	August 1991
Fabián Alarcón	Alfarista Radical Front	1991	1992
Carlos Vallejo López	Christian Democratic Union	August 1992	August 1993
Samuel Bellettini	Ecuadorian Radical Liberal Party	August 1993	August 1994
Heinz Moeller	Social Christian Party	August 1994	August 1995
Fabián Alarcón	Alfarista Radical Front	August 1995	February 1997
Heinz Moeller	Social Christian Party	February 1997	August 1998
Juan José Pons	Christian Democratic Union	August 1998	August 2000
Susana González Muñoz	Independent	August 2000	August 2000
Hugo Quevedo	Social Christian Party	August 2000	June 2001
José Cordero	Christian Democratic Union	June 2001	January 2003
Guillermo Landázuri	Democratic Left	January 2003	January 2005
Omar Quintana	Roldosist Party	January 2005	April 2005
Wilfrido Lucero	Democratic Left	April 2005	January 2007
Jorge Cevallos Macías	Institutional Renewal Party of National Action	January 2007	November 2007

== Sources ==
- Various editions of The Europa World Year Book
