= Carlos Falquez =

Ecuadorian politician (1942–2023)

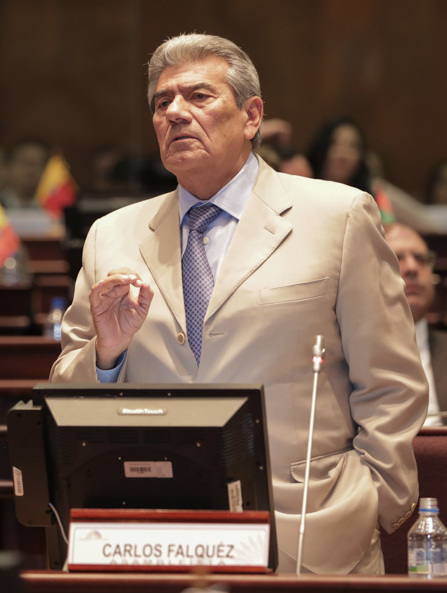
- Falquez in 2017

Member of the National Assembly of Ecuador for El Oro Province
- In office 14 May 2021 – 14 September 2022
- In office 14 May 2017 – 20 December 2018

Member of the National Congress of Ecuador for El Oro Province
- In office 10 August 1998 – 2004
- In office 10 August 1990 – 10 August 1992
- In office 10 August 1979 – 10 August 1984

Personal details
- Born: Pedro Carlos Falquez Batallas; 18 June 1942 Guayaquil, Ecuador
- Died: 28 August 2023 (aged 81) Machala, Ecuador
- Party: CFP; PSC
- Education: Instituto Nacional Mejía
- Occupation: Businessman

Pedro Carlos Falquez Batallas (18 June 1942 – 28 August 2023) was an Ecuadorian businessman and politician. A member of the Concentration of People's Forces and later the Christian Social Party, he served in the National Congress for three separate terms and the National Assembly from 2017 to 2018 and again from 2021 to 2022.

== Early life ==
Carlos Falquez was born in Guayaquil in 1942. He studied in Cuenca and Quito, before settling in Pasaje.

== Political career ==
His political career began in 1979 with Assad Bucaram's Concentration of People's Forces party. It was under this banner that he became a member of the National Congress. During a plenary session, he met León Febres Cordero and, since then, he has become a member of the Christian Social Party.

When Febres Cordero became president in 1984, Carlos Falquez became governor of El Oro and national sports director.

In 1990, he returned to the National Congress. In 1992, he was elected prefect, and again in 1996.

In 1998, he returned to Congress and became its vice-president. In 2002, he was re-elected. In 2004, he was elected mayor of Machala, a position he held until 2014. He wanted to run again, but because he owned a radio frequency, the El Oro electoral council disqualified him. His son stood in his place and became mayor.

Falquez died in Machala on 28 August 2023, at the age of 81.
