= Omar Quintana =

Ecuadorian politician (1943–2020)

President of the National Congress of Ecuador
- In office January 5, 2005 – April 20, 2005
- Preceded by: Guillermo Landázuri
- Succeeded by: Wilfrido Lucero

Deputy of the National Congress of Ecuador for Guayas Province
- In office 2003–2005

Personal details
- Born: Omar Quintana Baquerizo; March 22, 1944; Quito, Ecuador
- Died: April 3, 2020 (aged 76); Ecuador
- Political party: Ecuadorian Roldosist Party
- Spouse: Diana Noboa Pontón
- Children: 3

Omar Quintana Baquerizo (March 22, 1944 – April 3, 2020) was an Ecuadorian politician, sports executive, businessman, and member of the Ecuadorian Roldosist Party (PRE) and Institutional Renewal Party of National Action (PRIAN) political parties. Quintana served in the former National Congress of Ecuador from 2003 to 2005, including a tenure as the President of the National Congress from January 5, 2005, until April 20, 2005.

Additionally, Quintana was the former director of C.S. Emelec, a professional football sports club based in Guayaquil. Under his leadership, C.S. Emelec won three national football championships in 1979, 2001, and 2002. He also headed the Club 9 de Octubre football club when the team qualified for the Copa Libertadores competition in 1984 and 1985. Quintana owned the Ecuadorian franchises of Gold's Gym and built soccer fields in Guayaquil.

== Biography ==
Quintana was born in Quito, Ecuador, on March 22, 1944, but lived in Guayaquil and the nearby city of Playas, Ecuador. He was married to Diana Noboa Pontón and had three daughters, Diana, Olga, and Claudia. Quintana was a former basketball player before becoming a soccer team executive.

Quintana was an active member of the former Ecuadorian Roldosist Party (PRE) and Institutional Renewal Party of National Action (PRIAN), which was headed by his brother-in-law, Álvaro Noboa.

Omar Quintana died from COVID-19 during the COVID-19 pandemic in Ecuador on April 3, 2020, at the age of 76. He was one of three major soccer managers and executives to die from COVID-19 in the early days of the COVID-19 pandemic in Ecuador, including Silvio Devoto and Franklin Mazón, both from Barcelona S.C.
