= Bucaram =

Bucaram is a surname. Notable people with the surname include:

- Abdalá Bucaram (born 1952), Ecuadorian politician and lawyer, President of Ecuador from 10 August 1996 to 6 February 1997
- Assad Bucaram (1916–1981), Ecuadorian politician of Lebanese descent, Mayor of Guayaquil (1962–1963, 1968–1970)
- Martha Bucaram (born 1963), Ecuadorian economist and politician
- Averroes Bucaram (1954–2018), Ecuadorian politician, son of Assad and cousin of Abdala, president of the legislature
