= ¡Alfaro Vive, Carajo! =

Marxist–Leninist political-military organization from Ecuador

Eloy Alfaro Popular Armed Forces
- Fuerzas Armadas Populares Eloy Alfaro
- Other name: ¡Alfaro Vive, Carajo!
- Leader: Arturo Jarrin
- Founded: 1970s
- Dates active: 1980s
- Dissolved: 1991
- Country: Ecuador
- Ideology: Left-wing militancy
- Political position: Left-wing
- Size: 200-300
- Part of: America Battalion
- Wars: Terrorism in Ecuador
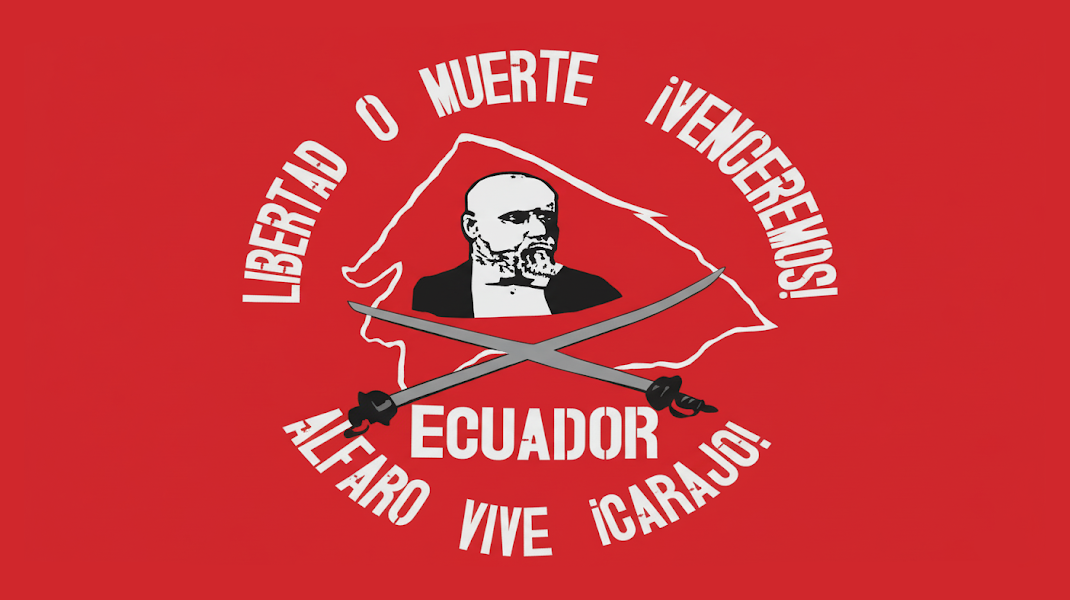
- Flag

¡Alfaro Vive, Carajo! (AVC) (Alfaro Lives, Dammit!), also called the Fuerzas Armadas Populares Eloy Alfaro (Eloy Alfaro Popular Armed Forces), was a clandestine left-wing group in Ecuador, founded in 1982 and named after popular government leader and general Eloy Alfaro. The group was labeled as a terrorist organization by the Ecuadorian state during the period of the former president León Febres Cordero. It existed between 1983 and 1991, when it carried out various armed actions and criminal acts in Ecuador, with Colombian (M-19) and Nicaraguan (Nicaraguan Revolution) influence. The group was initially formed sometime in the 1970s, but was not active militarily for the first few years of the 80's.

An openly leftist organization, but not Marxist, they identified with the Democratic Left coalition. The AVC first received national attention in 1983, when it broke into a museum and stole swords used by former president and leader of the liberal revolution, Eloy Alfaro. Some of the group's leaders were thought to be affiliated with Cuba, Libya and Nicaragua, and the group itself was linked to militant groups in other Latin American countries, such as M-19 and the Tupac Amaru Revolutionary Movement, establishing a group of joint operations called America Battalion with these two groups. Between 1986 and 1987, AVC carried out several kidnappings, robbed banks and a factory, seized several radio stations to broadcast their manifesto, and killed four policemen while retrieving a member of the group from police custody. At its height, the AVC had between 200 and 300 members. The AVC did not carry out attacks against the population or large-scale attacks since according to Santiago Kingman, the main ideologue of the AVC ...any bomb exploding alone, senseless... any killing of an unarmed person was stupid.

In response to this activity, the government began conducting raids against the group. The group's leader, Arturo Jarrin, was killed during a shootout against government forces in October 1986. By 1987, a large number of AVC leaders and members had been killed or arrested. In 1989, the Ecuadorian government reached an agreement with the AVC, and the group agreed to end its violence. In 1991, the group was officially reformed as a legitimate political party. A year later, eight members of the group made an illegal but non-violent entry into the British embassy in Quito, demanding the release of a group leader who was later imprisoned by the Ecuadorian government.

They were responsible for several criminal actions including robberies and kidnappings; highlighting the kidnapping of Nahim Isaías Barquet, who was the general manager of the bank Filanbanco in September 1985, who was killed while the intervention for his rescue was being carried out by the Anti-Terrorist Unit of the Special Forces Brigade of the Ecuadorian Army, ordered by the then president León Febres-Cordero. Due to the death in 1986 of its leader, Arturo Jarrín, arrests and the death of several other members in the same year took place as a result of the actions carried out by the security forces of the Ecuadorian State, AVC lost strength and was practically eliminated. According to the book The remnant of AVC, it formally handed over its weapons in 1991. The balance of the AVC campaign between 1983 and 1988 was: 16 AVC members, six members of the M-19, 14 police officers killed, more than 20 injured.

== Background ==
AVC arose during an economic crisis in the 1980s. During the 1970s Ecuador experienced an annual economic growth rate of 8.1% due in part to high oil prices. In 1982 the economy stagnated due to the fall in the price of oil and the simultaneous rise in interest rates in international markets. The middle and upper classes were the ones who benefitted the most from the oil boom, but the popular classes were the ones who suffered the costs of the economic adjustment when the boom ended.

Beginning with President Osvaldo Hurtado (1981–1984) the government of Ecuador applied measures dictated by the International Monetary Fund (IMF) to restructure the economy. These measures included: reducing fiscal spending, devaluing the local currency, and raising prices. The Febres-Cordero government (1984–1988) exacerbated the economic crisis. With the lowest oil price ever recorded in 1986.

His economic team was made up of three economists fully identified with the business sector: Carlos Julio Emanuel, Francisco Swett and Alberto Dahik. They devalued the Sucre, promoting agricultural exports and favoring economic groups. At the same time, they eliminated price controls and reduced the gasoline subsidy, increasing the price of gasoline by 70 percent. The impact of the crisis on the popular sectors increased unemployment and the inflation and reduced consumption. The crisis was felt particularly in the poor sectors of the cities with an average fall in real urban income of 8.7 percent per year from 1981 to 1989, the most large among Latin American countries.

== Conformation ==
AVC was formed mainly by middle-class students with an urban guerrilla focus. It formed part of other revolutionary organizations such as the Movimiento de Izquierda Revolucionaria (MIR). The MIR had student leaders, such as:

- Fausto Basantes and Ricardo Merino of the Mejía National Institute of Quito
- Arturo Jarrin. and Hamet Vásconez from La Salle College of Quito (currently La Salle-Conocoto)
- Juan Cuvi and Juan Carlos Acosta from American College of Quito
- Edgar Frías from the José Joaquín de Olmedo School, in Guayaquil.
- There were also alumni from the Colegio Nacional Juan Pío Montúfar, Benalcázar and Cardenal Spellman schools in Quito.

Arturo Jarrín entered the Central University of Ecuador in Quito, to study sociology, leaving it during his fourth year, after participating in popular organization activities in the Ciudadela Ferroviaria de Quito, he joined AVC, becoming the leader of the organization being elected at The First AVC National Conference held in Esmeraldas in February 1983, attended by around 60 guerrillas. In it, the Central Command formed by three people, including Jarrín. Prior to this, in January, Jarrín and other guerrillas assaulted the Banco de Fomento. AVC called all bank robberies "financial recoveries," which were the organization's primary means of financial support.

== Assaults ==
The following is a partial list of armed robberies of banking institutions carried out by AVC members with the respective amounts stolen. The amounts in US dollars are approximate with the price of the year in which they occurred.

Date	City	Bank	Branch	Amount (USD)
July 1983	Quito	Multi-exchange agency	Headquarters	16,000
March 1984	Quito	Multi-exchange agency	Headquarters	9,000
June 1984	Quito	Banco del Pacífico	La Villafora	43,000
January 1985	Guayaquil	Banco de Descuento	Stock truck	32,000
April 1985	Guayaquil	Hollandsche Bank-Unie	Guayaquil branch	13,000
May 1985	Guayaquil	Banco Continental	Guayaquil Branch	4,000
June 1985	Quito	Banco Consolidado	El Labrador agency	18,000
July 1985	Guayaquil	Banco La Previsora	Branch No.7	14,020

== History ==
The group was initially formed some time in the 1970s but was not militarily active for the first several years of its existence. An avowedly leftist but non-Marxist organisation, they identified with the Democratic Left coalition. AVC first received national attention in 1983, when it broke into a museum and stole swords which had been used by Eloy Alfaro. Some of the group's leaders were thought to be affiliated with Cuba, Libya and Nicaragua, and the group itself was linked to militant groups from other Latin-American countries, such as the M-19 and the Túpac Amaru Revolutionary Movement, establishing a joint operations group called America Battalion with these two groups. From 1986 to 1987, AVC carried out several kidnappings, robbed banks and a factory, took over a number of radio stations to broadcast their manifesto, and killed four police officers while retrieving a group member from police custody.

In response to this activity, the government began carrying out raids against the group. The group's leader Arturo Jarrin was killed during a shootout with government forces in October 1986. By 1987, a large number of AVC's leaders and members had either been killed or arrested. In 1989, the government of Ecuador reached an agreement with AVC, with the group agreeing to end its violence. In 1991, the group officially reformed as a legitimate political party. One year later, eight group members made an illegal, but non-violent entry into the British Embassy in Quito, demanding the release of a group leader who was then imprisoned by the Ecuadorian government.

=== Robbery of the sword of Eloy Alfaro ===
The first operation to receive extensive media coverage was the theft of the swords of Eloy Alfaro and Pedro José Montero from the Municipal Museum of Guayaquil, on 11 August. In January 2012, Rosa Mireya Cárdenas, who served as Secretary of Peoples, as a delegate of former AVC members, she returned the swords to the then President of Ecuador Rafael Correa.

=== 1983–1985 ===
Since the beginning of 1983, the AVC carried out a large number of operations, which included actions such as bank robberies and graffiti, seeking in this way to achieve loudness in the media, which according to the AVC, were controlled by the "right".

The first National Conference is held between 12 and 14 February 1983 in Tonsupa Esmeraldas, where the "Eloy Alfaro People's Revolutionary Forces" are constituted, under the Slogan "Alfaro Lives, Dammit". On 11 March, an attempt was made to assault the payer of Casa Baca (Quito), as a result of which Ricardo Merino and Vicente López were arrested. On 8 July, the Bust of Eloy Alfaro was stolen from the headquarters of the Supreme Liberal Junta in Quito

On 22 September, at the Pululahua resort (Pichincha), Jarrín, Mireya Cárdenas and Edgar Frías held a press conference in which they announced the existence of the organization. On 2 November, the facilities of the radio stations: Noticia, La Fabulosa and Universal de Guayaquil were seized to condemn the intervention of United States in Nicaragua. At the end of 1983 Jarrín and about twenty guerrillas traveled to Libya to receive military training in one of the camps sponsored by Muammar Gaddafi. Basantes and Frías temporarily assumed control of AVC. In October, during training near Esmeraldas, Basantes and Cárdenas were arrested for illegal possession of weapons.

In April 1984, after the return of Jarrín from Libya and the release of Basantes from prison, the members of the AVC met and elected a Central Command made up of Jarrín, Basantes and Frías. On 4 May, the AVC occupied the offices of the Ecuadorian News Agency (ANE) in Guayaquil to send a message against León Febres-Cordero, then a candidate for the presidency of Ecuador, and in support of Rodrigo Borja. On 29 May, AVC militants abandoned pamphlets and detonated a low-power explosive in the Metropolitan Cathedral of Quito.

On 12 June, the brothers Ricardo and Lilian Jarrín (both disguised as religious) assaulted the Banco de los Andes in Quito. On 14 June, Jarrín along with half a dozen guerrillas assaulted the Banco del Pacífico, also in Quito. After the robbery, Jarrín and other guerrillas took refuge in the house of Consuelo Benavides, a worker at the Ministry of Industries and an AVC sympathizer. The police captured and tortured them. After the arrest of his sister and the threat of arrest of their parents by the police, Jarrín confessed his identity, his membership of the AVC and his participation in the robbery of Banco del Pacífico. Benavides for her part remained detained for months, accused of illicit association. She was released on 14 April 1985, after which she contacted the AVC in a rural area of Esmeraldas.

On 10 August, the day that Febres-Cordero assumed the presidency of Ecuador, the AVC took over several radio stations to announce its opposition to the incoming government. In December, the AVC stole toys from a Quito factory and then distributed them among the residents of the poor neighborhoods of the city. At the end of that month Hamet Vásconez, who had been in El Salvador, arrived in Ecuador and joined the AVC Central Command, replacing Jarrín, who was detained in the García Moreno Prison in Quito.

Months later on 1 November, they seized the newspaper Hoy and forced to include in its edition two pages with information about the group. On 8 November, they kidnapped a reporter from the newspaper Meridiano de Guayaquil to force an interview with Fausto Basantes Borja.

On 2 January 1985, they assaulted an armored vehicle of the Banco de Descuento in Guayaquil, resulting in the death of a guerrilla Jorge Lima Trujillo and the arrest of another.

On 12 March, they attacked the weapons warehouse of the National Police at the headquarters of the Central de Radiopatrullas. Seven guerrillas dressed as policemen, one with lieutenant's insignia, overpowered the five policemen on duty, cut the telephone lines, disconnected the radio system; stealing 631 38 caliber revolvers, 40 carbines and several boxes of bullets. Days later the police found part of the weapons in a vacant lot. In April Hamet Vásconez was arrested and his position in the AVC Central Command was taken over by Pedro Moncada. Colombian M-19 guerrilla member Fernando Carmona was also detained.

On 29 April of the same year, the director of the now-defunct José Franco Piedra Institute for Agrarian Reform and Colonization was kidnapped. In an anonymous call, the Alfaro Vive group claimed responsibility for the kidnapping. On 10 May, they seized radio station Iris from Esmeraldas to broadcast an AVC proclamation. On 21 May, they assaulted the Continental Bank of Guayaquil. On 24 May they took over the stations Z-1, 11-Q and Radio Uno from Guayaquil. On 29 May they took over Radio Continente.

On 2 August, they assaulted a Filanbanco armored vehicle in Guayaquil, where Enrique Mejía and Joel Vargas were arrested. On 9 August, they assaulted a PRONACA factory on the road to El Quinche where they were arrested three members. On 30 August, during a police operation in the Alborada citadel in Guayaquil, a member died and four others were arrested.

On 16 October, they seized the embassy of Mexico in response to the rupture of their diplomatic relations with Nicaragua. The same seized Radio Visión to force them to conduct an interview with Arturo Jarrín. On 25 October, they assaulted the Citibank agency in Quito disguised as nuns and lottery sellers.

On 7 December, they attacked an ENPROVIT warehouse in Durán.

=== Escape from the prison ===
At dawn on 28 April, the AVC launched an operation to free Jarrín and Vásconez from Penal García Moreno. From a nearby commercial premises they dug a tunnel through which Jarrín, Vásconez and two other members of the AVC escaped, taking advantage of the guards' shift change. The tunnel ended in the courtyard of the Prison, where the members of the AVC carried out exercises. The construction of the tunnel was supervised by Marco Troya, a former miner.

=== Nahim Isaís kidnapping ===
The first kidnapping staged by AVC occurred in August 1985, when Nahim Isaías, owner of Filanbanco, was kidnapped for 26 days, dying in the operation that tried to free him. The AVC wanted 5 million dollars for his ransom with whom he planned to train guerrillas together with the Colombian M-19 and form a rural guerrilla in Ecuador. A secondary objective was to make a political statement, being part of the Ecuadorian banking and commercial oligarchy. Thinking that the government would not put Isaías's life at risk and they would negotiate a financial bailout.

Juan Cuvi, Juan Carlos Acosta and Colombian guerrillas from the M-19 followed Isaías' activities for months until they found a weakness in his security measures. On 7 August they executed his plan, when Isaías arrived at his country house, known as "Las Alturas", 8 kilometers from Guayaquil on the road to Daule. Their plan was to take him to a safe house in Manta. After the kidnapping, the guerrillas left Isaías' house in two cars: one carried the kidnapped with guerrillas and the other Juan Cuvi and Juan Carlos Acosta. Cuvi and Acosta's vehicle stopped at a gas station in Nobol where a police unit patrolling the area arrested them. The guerrillas from the second vehicle exchanged fire with the police and fled to Guayaquil, where they had to take Isaías to a house in the La Chala neighborhood.

Both Cuvi and Acosta were tortured by the police and by members of military intelligence. Acosta died on 28 August in a hospital after being severely tortured. Acosta was reportedly denied medical attention until his family intervened (his father was a former foreign minister), according to the official version he was injured during his detention after he shot members of the police. The President of the Republic assured that he had personally intervened in the case to save his life. According to his mother, Laura Coloma de Acosta, who visited him in the hospital earlier his body was covered in bruises and his testicles were mangled.

Isaías remained kidnapped in the house in the La Chala neighborhood until 31 August, when the police surrounded the house. To free him, a ransom of $10 million and a plane to leave Ecuador were demanded. In accordance with the state policy of not negotiating with terrorists, on 2 September at 03:26 the Anti-Terrorist Unit of the Special Forces Brigade of the Ecuadorian Army was ordered to carry out a rescue operation. According to the government, members of the Isaías family were present when the operation was ordered. As a result, both Isaiah and his kidnappers died.

The failure of this operation collapsed the AVC's first attempt to generate an economic base.

==== Eduardo Granda kidnap attempt ====
On 18 December the AVC unsuccessfully tries to kidnap Eduardo Granda, heir to the family then owner of the television channel Teleamazonas, the plan was to capture him before entering his home, in the north of Quito, but he defended himself with a gun, wounding a woman guerrilla, who would be captured in a hospital where his wound was treated.

=== 1986 ===
During 1986 the actions carried out by the government almost completely neutralized the AVC, seeking mainly to eliminate its leaders (Jarrín, Basantes and Vásconez). The government had the support of an informant within the AVC, Fernando Flores, who agreed to help in exchange for a US visa. He helped police set up an ambush on Avenida de la Prensa in Quito in which Basantes was killed on 4 January.

On 31 January, they tried to blow up towers 3 and 4 of the National Interconnected System on the Panamericana Sur, km. 11–12, with dynamite charges. On 4 February, a pamphlet bomb was detonated in the IESS hall in Quito.

== In popular culture ==
The group is the subject of a 2007 documentary film titled ¡Alfaro vive carajo! Del Sueño Al Caos.

The post-hardcore rock group At The Drive-In has an EP named ¡Alfaro Vive, Carajo!
