= Enrique Ayala Mora =

Ecuadorian historian and professor (born 1950)

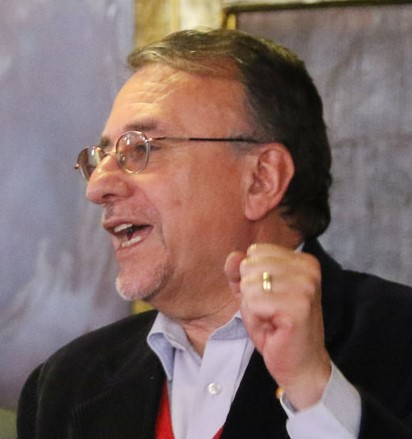
- Enrique Ayala en 2016
- Born: Manuel Enrique Alejandro Ayala Mora; November 13, 1950 (age 74); Ecuador
- Occupations: Historian, university professor, journalist and politician

Academic background
- Education: Catholic University of Quito (1972–1984)

Academic work
- Discipline: History of Ecuador, political history
- Institutions: Pontifical Catholic University of Ecuador
- Website: www.uasb.edu.ec/docente/enrique-ayala-mora/

Manuel Enrique Alejandro Ayala Mora (born November 13, 1950) is a historian, political editorial writer, and a professor of Ecuador, who has been ideologue of the Socialist Party of Ecuador, and founder and former rector of the headquarters of Quito from the Universidad Andina Simón Bolívar.

In academics he has reached the degree of PhD in Modern History being an important historian in his country. He works as a professor at the Central University of Ecuador and the Simón Bolívar Andean University.

Politically he is a member of the Ecuadorian Socialist Party, appearing for three periods as part of the National Congress. In recent times he has been part of the anti-government faction of his party, Renovación Socialista, opposing to the official position of the party to the government of Rafael Correa.

== Biography ==
=== Childhood ===
Enrique Ayala was born on November 13, 1950. His father, Enrique Ayala Pasquel was a sympathizer of the velasquismo, who formed a traditional and Catholic family with 8 children. He began his primary studies in 1956 at the Instituto Rosales de los Hermanos Cristianos, and his secondary education was carried out since 1962 at the Sánchez y Cifuentes School where he obtained his bachelor's degree in Modern Humanities in 1968.

== Academic and political life ==
Enrique obtained his BA in 1972 and his PhD in 1975 in Education from the Pontifical Catholic University of Ecuador. In this university he would initiate his connection with socialism, supporting the process of modernization of the university in the change of the credit system, in which the members of the Opus Dei became his opponents.

Since the year he obtained his degree, he began working at the university as academic coordinator of the Department of Social and Political Sciences, appointed by Hernán Malo González, and director of seminars on Ecuadorian Political Thought. At the same time, he joined the Revolutionary Socialist Youth and was elected as a student representative before the Academic Council of the Catholic University.

He married Magdalena Román Pérez, from Ibarreña, with whom he has two children, in 1976. In that same year, he began to be affected by an internal conflict at the Catholic University of Quito. At that time, he proposed to the Faculty of Human Sciences the investigation of the ideological historical development of the political parties in Ecuador, a work that was accepted and carried out until 1978, which he circulated under the title of Political Struggle and Origin of the Parties in Ecuador.

In 1978, he traveled to the United Kingdom, where after studying English at Cambridge, he entered the University of Essex which the following year he obtained a Master's degree in Comparative history. In 1982 he received the doctorate (PhD) in Modern History at the University of Oxford.

== On the return to democracy ==
The following year after going to England, the military left power to Ecuador. Upon returning to the country, he collaborates in the organization of the Socialist Party. In 1984 he stopped being a professor at the Catholic University, under pressure from León Febres-Cordero, something that had also happened in 1987 at the Latin American Faculty of Social Sciences where he had worked since 1982.

During this time he went to the National Congress in 1986 representing Imbabura and the Socialist Party, being part of the Progressive Parliamentary Bloc along with the deputies of the Democratic Left and the Broad Left Front (FADI), the Popular Democratic Movement (MPD), among other proclaimed leftists who opposed the social-Christian regime. His term ended in 1988.

In 1987 he served as the third secretary of the National Executive Committee of the Socialist Party. In 1990 he returned to Congress representing the same party until 1992. During this period he joined the opposition to the regime of Rodrigo Borja Cevallos.

In the same year he began his work to organize a headquarter in Quito for the Universidad Andina Simón Bolívar. In 1995 his party merged with the FADI, forming the Socialist Party-Frente Amplio (PS-FA).

In 1997 and 1998 he was a member of the Constituent Assembly generated after the fall of Abdalá Bucaram, forming part of the Patriotic Convergence between the left parties that faced the majority of the Flattener, which after its weakening allowed the convergence to integrate social policies to the 1998 Constitution.

In 2003 he entered the National Congress again representing the province of Pichincha which he remained until 2007. During the government of Rafael Correa, he has been part of the anti-government faction of his party, Socialist Rebirth, contrary to the official position of the party as close to the regime.

In the 2017 elections, he was nominated for provincial assemblyman of Imbabura by the Popular Unity Movement, after being supported by the formation of the National Agreement for Change of which he became its coordinator on September 28, 2016, after Paco Moncayo became a candidate for the presidency.

== Political career ==
- The National Congress of Ecuador 1986–1988, Deputy of Imbabura Province (Socialist Party – Broad Front of Ecuador)
- National Congress of Ecuador 1986–1987, Vice President (Socialist Party – Broad Front of Ecuador)
- National Congress of Ecuador 1990–1992, Deputy for the Imbabura Province (Socialist Party – Broad Front of Ecuador)
- Constituent assembly of Ecuador 1997–1998, Assemblyman of Imbabura Province (Socialist Party – Broad Front of Ecuador)
- National Congress of Ecuador 2003–2007, Deputy for the Pichincha Province(Socialist Party – Broad Front of Ecuador)
- National Government of Ecuador 2016, Pre-candidate for President (National Agreement for Change)
- National Assembly of Ecuador 2017, Candidate for Assemblyman of Imbabura Province (Popular Unity Movement)

== Publications ==
- New History of Ecuador (als Herausgeber), (15 Bände), Quito, Corporación Editora Nacional-Grijalbo, 1988–1995.
- Socialism and the Ecuadorian nation, Quito, Ediciones La Tierra, 2005.
- Summary of History of Ecuador, Quito, General Library of Culture, volume 1, Corporación Editora Nacional, 13a. ed., 2006.
- Integration teaching in the Andean countries, Lima, Secretariat
- History of Ecuador, volumes 1 and 2.
- Gabriel García Moreno, his political project and his death
- History of the Ecuadorian liberal revolution
- José María Velasco Ibarra: An anthology of his texts
- Bolivarism in Ecuador
- Thoughts of Pedro Moncayo
- Simon Bolivar
- Ecuador-Peru: history of conflict and peace
- Political struggle and origin of parties in Ecuador
- History of the National Congress
- Constituent assembly: challenges and opportunities
- Socialism and the Ecuadorian nation
- The crisis of socialism: challenges and perspectives in Ecuador and Latin America
