= Marco Proaño Maya =

Ecuadorian politician (1945–2026)

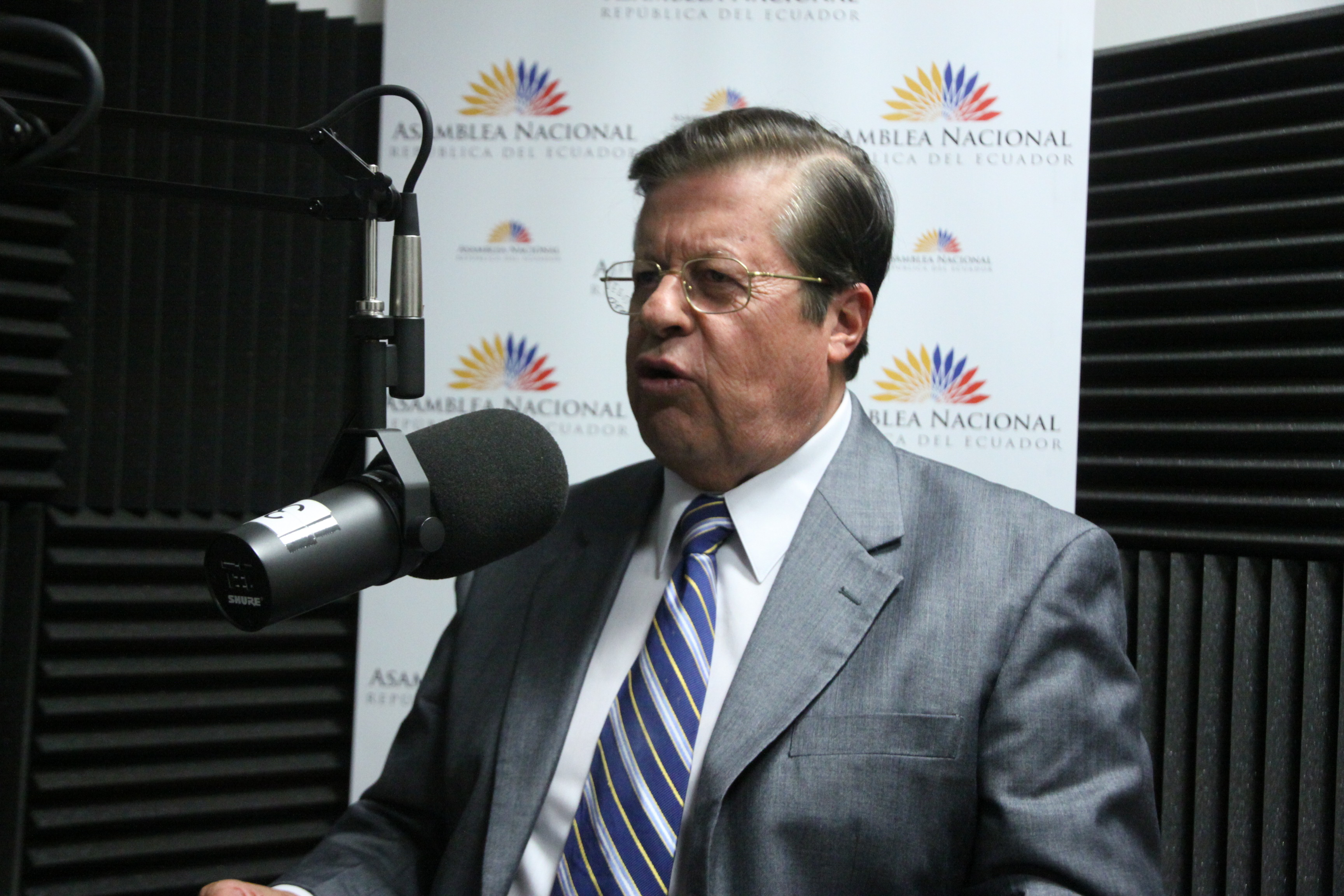
- Proaño in 2011

Member of the National Congress of Ecuador
- In office 1 May 1994 – 29 November 2007
- In office 31 January 1988 – 17 May 1992
- In office 29 April 1979 – 29 January 1984

Personal details
- Born: Marco Antonio Proaño Maya; 12 March 1945 Otavalo, Ecuador
- Died: 10 January 2026 (aged 80) Quito, Ecuador
- Party: CFP; PRE
- Education: Pontifical Catholic University of Ecuador
- Occupation: Lawyer

Marco Antonio Proaño Maya (12 March 1945 – 10 January 2026) was an Ecuadorian politician. A member of the Concentration of People's Forces and the Ecuadorian Roldosist Party, he thrice served in the National Congress; 1979 to 1984, 1988 to 1992, and 1994 to 2007.

Proaño died in Quito on 10 January 2026, at the age of 80.
