= Miriam Estrada-Castillo =

Ecuadorian lawyer and activist

Miriam Estrada Castillo
- Born: Guayaquil, Ecuador
- Education: University of Guayaquil
- Occupations: Lawyer, professor
- Employer(s): United Nations, UNESCO, Casa Grande University
- Known for: Human rights work; United Nations peacekeeping
- Notable work: The Circle of Empowerment
- Spouse: Enrique Gil Calderón
- Children: 3

Miriam Estrada Castillo is an Ecuadorian lawyer and professor.

== Early life ==
Castillo was born in Guayaquil, Ecuador to Pablo Estrada Valle, one of the founders of CFP (Concentración de Fuerzas Populares), an influential Ecuadorian political party. She graduated from the American School of Guayaquil with honours and studied Law in the Faculty of Law and Social and Political Sciences of the University of Guayaquil, Ecuador, getting her academic degrees as a Doctor in Jurisprudence and a bachelor's in social and political sciences as a Valedictorian. Her PhD thesis: "Revolution, Art, and Human Rights" was considered a contribution for the legal culture of Ecuador, receiving the honour of being published by the University of Guayaquil. She was awarded, amongst 1200 other graduates, with the "University of Guayaquil" Award, for obtaining the highest scores during her student life and for the contributions she made as an academic. She was married to the founder of the Choral Movement of Ecuador, Maestro Enrique Gil Calderon, with whom she had her three children, Abogado Alfredo Antonio Gil Estrada, Maestro Fernando Gil Estrada and Magister and International Consultant, Alba Gil Estrada.

== Career ==
Estrada-Castillo is known as the first Ecuadorian woman ever deployed to a UN peace keeping operation Mission of the Department of Peacekeeping Operations as a member of the first Civilian Support Group of Advisers elected by the UN Security Council as "the one hundred most highly qualified candidates in the world" under the recommendations of "The Report of the Panel on UN Peace Operations", commonly known as the Brahimi Report. Currently, she is the Chairperson of the Special Mechanism of Human Rights Working Group on Arbitrary Detentions, Human Rights Council.

As the Chairperson of the Civilian Support Group of Advisers, Miriam Estrada worked for three and a half years on the first Nation Building experience of the United Nations UNMISET in accordance to the mandate established by the UN Security Council regarding Timor-Leste. Estrada acted as the International Prosecutor and Senior Legal Adviser to the Timorese Minister of Justice. She established and organised the legal structure and administrative management system for the Prosecutor General Office and the Prosecution Services for Timor-Leste. She wrote the necessary criminal laws and procedures for the country and developed capacity building activities for its officers. Estrada created the Timorese National Policy on Legal Education, ensured the inclusion of Human Rights principles, gender mainstream and children rights as cross-cutting issues in the Timorese National Syllabi adopted by the First Judicial Training Centre of East-Timor. The most important contribution for women's rights was her Handbook containing the Special Guidelines for Victims of Domestic Violence published by the Office of the Prosecutor General of East-Timor and adopted as the training manual for police Forces, national prosecutors and the East-Timorese national Special Victims Unit.

During 2001, Estrada was a visiting fellow at the Humanities Research Centre, Australian National University. The research produced by Dr. Estrada during her fellowship: "Australian & Latin American Human Rights Action Plans: Critical and Comparative Analysis" is being used as official material for the first distance learning education course "Human Rights in Action" broadcast by the Spanish-Latin American Educational Television Network, from its headquarters in Madrid, Spain founded and organised by Miriam Estrada in cooperation with Teleducando an International NGO working on Distance Learning Education, named by UNESCO as the First Peace Broadcast in Latin America. The course is taught in 243 Universities in Latin America. The song "An Ecuadorian Woman" written by Estrada during her fellowship, received an Award in the contest "Art defending Women's Rights" organised by UNIFEM in Santiago de Chile.

== Accomplishments ==
Estrada has accomplished a significant work on the dissemination and promotion of Human Rights and Culture of Peace Principles from positions held throughout her professional career. She has held positions such as Independent Expert Mandate Holder of the Special Procedures Working Group on Arbitrary Detentions for the United Nations and the Senior Officer of the Counterterrorism Executive Directorate, also for the United Nations.

Additionally, Estrada-Castillo has served as Chairperson and a member of the Monitoring Committee of the United Nations Convention on the Elimination of All Forms of Discrimination Against Women (CEDAW). She was also part of the Special Task Force for the organization of the Fourth World Conference on Women and member of the Special Group who wrote the CEDAW Optional Protocol.

In her endeavors as Regional Adviser on Human Rights and Culture of Peace for UNESCO, Chief of Field of the United Nations Office of the High Commissioner for Human Rights, for implementing the National Human Rights Action Plans for Ecuador and Latin America, Special Adviser on Human Rights to the Andean Parliament, Special Adviser to the National Congress and to the Ecuadorian Supreme Court on Social, Family, and Human Rights Legislation.

Estrada-Castillo has served as Minister of Social Welfare of Ecuador and President of the Ecuadorian Supreme Court for Children and Juvenile Justice.

Estrada is the author of the first Ecuadorian Legislation for Minors and Family currently in line with the International Convention of the Rights of the Child.

== Academic life ==
In the academic field, Estrada is currently contributing as a full professor of international law, human rights, gender, and contemporary global citizenship at Casa Grande University and as a visiting professor at Bard College, Palestine Branch, where she teaches literature and human rights.

As leading international expert on human rights with the Raoul Wallenberg Institute of Human Rights and Humanitarian Law (RWI) she provided training on human rights to military, police, and judicial officers, lawyers and NGO's representatives in Latin America, Europe, Africa, Eastern Europe and Asia.

In cooperation with the RWI Programme in Turkey and the BİLGİ University, Miriam Estrada Castillo trained members of the Turkish Supreme Court of Justice, the judges of the Criminal Court, the members of the General Prosecution Services, lawyers and members of NGOs—particularly those working on women rights—in Turkey.

Estrada was Founding Director of the First Postgraduate Specialization Course on Human Rights of the Postgraduate Institute for International Studies, Faculty of Law, and Central University of Ecuador and as its Human Rights Professor for twelve years. As Special Adviser to UNICEF, Estrada created the Latin American Curricula for Children Rights, adopted by the Universities of the Region. She has been the Founding Director of the First Human Rights Distance Learning Education Course, Director and Founder Professor of the Lecture "Human Rights and Democracy", Catholic University of Guayaquil. Founder Professor of the Chair "Human Rights of Women", University of Guayaquil. Founder Professor of the Lecture "Culture of Peace and non Violence", Faculty of Law, Universidad Central, Quito, and Professor of International Criminal Law at the same university. Professor In the Department of International Law(International Law and Human Rights and International Law and Settlement of Dispute)at the United Nations University For Peace, San Jose, Costa Rica.

== Awards ==
She has received the National Medal of Honour in the Grade of "Caballero" from the National Congress of Ecuador for her contribution to the Construction of a Culture of Human Rights, Social Justice, and Peace in Ecuador. The National Award from the International Latin American Ombudsman Federation for the outstanding support to the promotion and diffusion of Human Rights within South America. The Medal of Honour, from the Andean Parliament for her contribution to the development of Social Justice Policies within the Latin-American Region and the Special Award "Universidad de Guayaquil" for the most outstanding doctoral thesis: "Revolution, Art, and Human Rights".

== Activities as journalist ==
As journalist and media activist, she is Member of the Editorial Council of TEVEMAS (Iberoamerican Educational TV Network) and worked for 10 years as its TV Programme Director. Her activities on this field include being editorialist for "El Universo", host for the TV Weekly Programme "Political Analysis in Ecuador", host of the TV Weekly Programme: "Building a Culture of Peace", host of the TV Segment "Talking about Your Rights", and Advisor on Human Rights for Women and Family to the Ecuadorian TV Channels and Media for 17 years.

== Current professional activities ==
Miriam Estrada Castillo is now a retired legal and political adviser to the United Nations Security Council Counter-Terrorism Committee Executive Directorate, monitoring countries from Africa, the Middle East, Latin American and the Caribbean for their compliance to the UN Conventions against Terrorism and Human Rights instruments.

Since 2007 Miriam Estrada Castillo was appointed as an Ad-honorem Member of the Mexico Citizens' Observatory for Women's Rights' Directive Board; as recognition for her in-depth expertise and commitment for Women's Rights.

Amongst her fifteen publications are:

- The Circle of Empowerment: twenty five years of the UN Committee for the Elimination of all Forms of Discrimination against Women
- Memories of a Conquer:Studies and Testimonies on the Incorporation of Women Rights on the new Ecuadorian Constitution.
- Children on the Move: how to implement their right to family life
- Colorea tus derechos con Justin (book for children)
- The Law and the Children (El Derecho y Los Chicos)
