= Rodrigo Paz Delgado =

Ecuadorian politician (1933–2021)

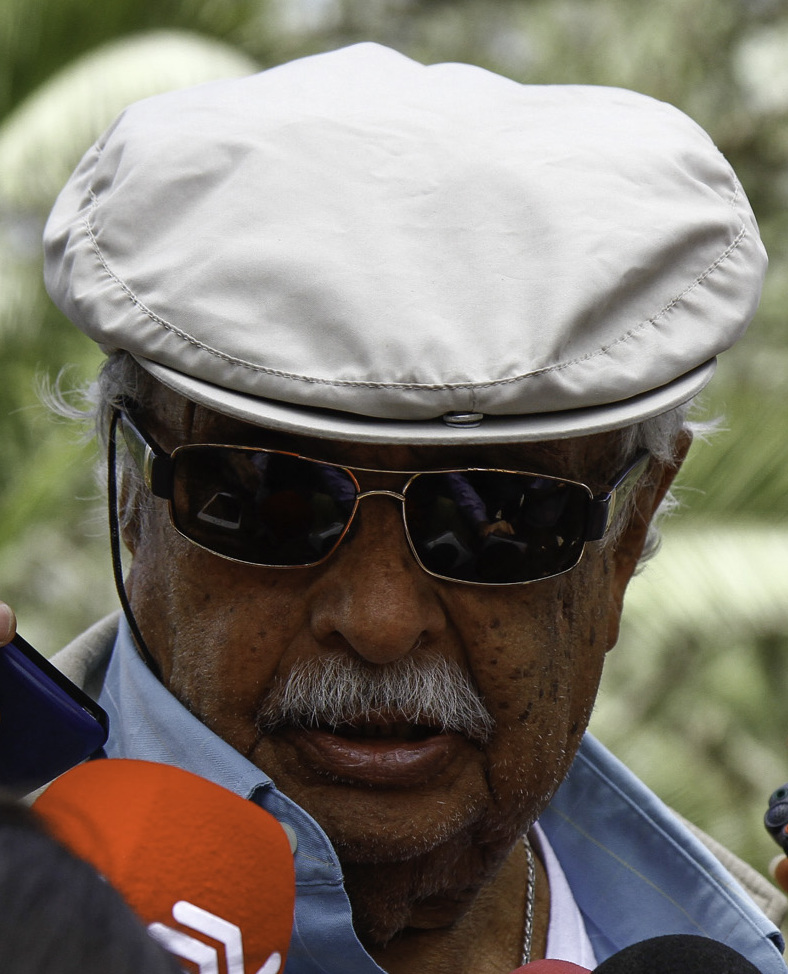

Mayor of the Metropolitan District of Quito
- In office 10 August 1988 – 10 August 1992
- Preceded by: Gustavo Herdoíza
- Succeeded by: Jamil Mahuad

Personal details
- Born: 20 December 1933 Tulcán, Carchi, Ecuador
- Died: 17 August 2021 (aged 87) Tampa, Florida, United States
- Spouse: Cecilia Rodríguez
- Children: 3
- Occupation: Businessman

Rodrigo Paz Delgado (20 December 1933 – 17 August 2021) was an Ecuadorian politician and businessman. He was the mayor of Quito from 1988 to 1992. He ran as a presidential candidate in 1996. One of his political parties was Democracia Popular (DP).

Paz was Minister of Finance from 1980 to 1981. He had been the principal director of Liga Deportiva Universitaria de Quito since 1997, but had been involved with the club since 1959.

On 17 August 2021, Paz died of gastrointestinal bleeding in Tampa, Florida, United States, at the age of 87.

== See also ==
- Estadio Rodrigo Paz Delgado: a sports stadium in Quito that bears his name
