= 1962 Ecuadorian parliamentary election =

Parliamentary elections were held in Ecuador on 3 June 1962.

== Results ==
Party	Votes	%
Civic Christian Action	144,840	23.21
Conservative Party	142,612	22.85
Concentration of People's Forces	118,501	18.99
Forces of the Radical Liberation	102,034	16.35
Velasquist Federation of Pichincha	42,001	6.73
National Democratic Front	31,376	5.03
Civic Union of Pichincha	18,953	3.04
Ecuadorian Radical Liberal Party	3,164	0.51
Socialist Party	1,313	0.21
Others	19,258	3.09
Total	624,052	100.00
Valid votes	624,052	89.23
Invalid/blank votes	75,357	10.77
Total votes	699,409	100.00
Source: Nohlen
