= Wilfrido Lucero =

Ecuadorian politician (1935–2022)

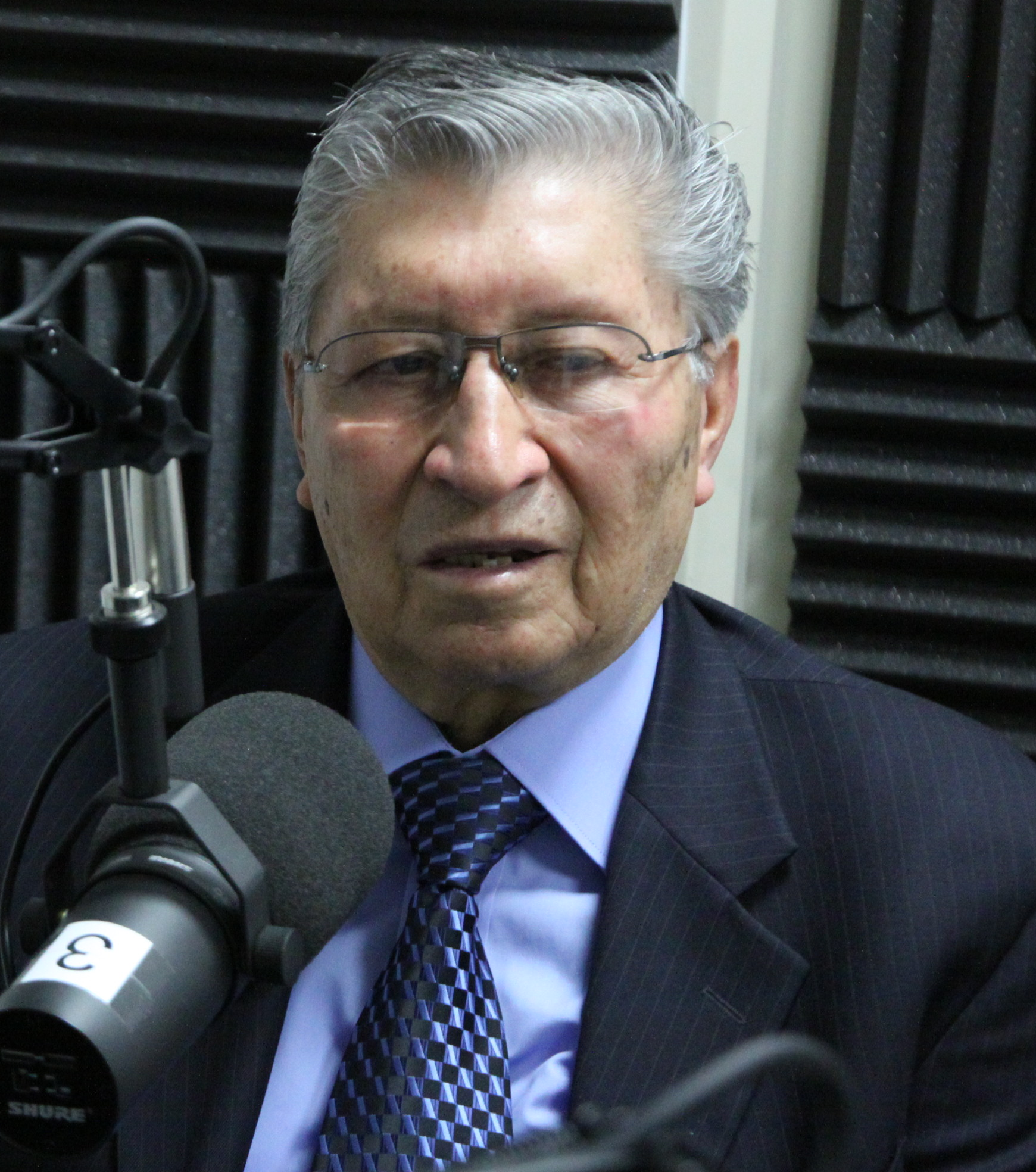
- Lucero in 2016
- Born: 28 December 1935; Tulcán, Carchi Province, Ecuador
- Died: 1 February 2022 (aged 86)
- Occupation: Politician

Wilfrido Lucero (28 December 1935 – 1 February 2022) was an Ecuadorian politician who served as President of the National Congress.

== Life and career ==
Born in Tulcán into a family of farmers, in 1963 Lucero graduated in law at the Pontifical Catholic University of Ecuador. He started his political activity at young age, becoming local councillor at 21 years old. After having been mayor of his hometown, he served six terms as a parliamentarian starting from 1979. He served three terms as President of the National Congress. Lucero died on 1 February 2022, at the age of 86.
