= Rafael Pólit =

Ecuadorian politician and Cabinet minister

Rafael Pólit Cevallos (1823 - 1897) studied at the Central University of Quito and joined the Conservative Party of Ecuador of Gabriel García Moreno. He was President of the Municipal Council of Guayaquil. He was President of the Senate when Congress resumed after the assassination of García Moreno on 6 August 1875. From 4 October 1875 - 9 December 1875 he held the combined office of Minister of the Interior and Minister of Foreign Affairs. He was also Minister of Finance.

In 1878 the government sent him into exile, but later he returned. On 2 May 1895 he became head of the government of Guayas, but resigned within a month.

He died on 23 October 1897 in Quito.
