= Democratic People's Movement =

Democratic People's Movement Movimiento Popular Democrático
- Historical leaders: Jaime Hurtado
- Founded: 17 March 1978
- Dissolved: 3 July 2014
- Succeeded by: Popular Unity
- Headquarters: Quito
- Newspaper: Patria Nueva
- Youth wing: Revolutionary Youth of Ecuador
- Ideology: Marxism–Leninism; Socialism
- Political position: Left-wing
- National affiliation: PCMLE
- Colours: Turquoise and Orange

Website
- Official web site

The Democratic People's Movement (Spanish: Movimiento Popular Democrático, MPD) was the electoral wing of the Marxist-Leninist Communist Party of Ecuador (affiliated with the ICMLPO-U&S) and a political party in Ecuador since 1978.

== History ==
At the legislative elections of 20 October 2002, the party won at least 3 out of 100 seats. It again won 3 seats at the 2006 elections, where its presidential candidate Luis Villacis came in 9th place with 1.33% of the vote. In the 2009 National Assembly elections it won 5 out of 124 seats with 4.05% of the vote.

Within 26 years of its founding, the MPD reached 29 national and provincial deputies, a prefect, 33 provincial councilors, 21 mayors and council chairmen, 285 councilors, and 313 parish council members.

Issue 140 (2/2007) of Patria Nueva mentioning Jaime Hurtado, the MPD's assassinated Presidential candidate

The principles of the party can be summarized in its slogan: the "conquest of a popular government, patriotic, democratic, and revolutionary that resolutely applies its program and lays the groundwork for the conquest of socialism."

The MPD was a party with union presence and plays a leading role in the organization of strikes and the politicization of state educational entities through its participation in the National Union of Educators. This brought it success within the trade unions.

From 9 to 13 July 2007, the MPD and PCMLE jointly organized the XI International Seminar's "Problems of Revolution in Latin America," which was attended by, in addition to the MPD and PCMLE, organizations like the FARC, the Popular Liberation Army of Colombia, the Manuel Rodriguez Patriotic Front of Chile, the Communist Party of Peru - Red Fatherland, and several other organizations in Ecuador, including the Revolutionary Youth of Ecuador, the Federation of University Students of Ecuador, the General Workers Union of Ecuador, and the United Federation of Affiliates for Peasant Social Security.

== Electoral results ==
=== Presidential elections ===
Election	Candidate	First round		Second round		Position
Election	Candidate	#	%	#	%	Position
1978-1979	—					
1984	Jaime Hurtado	161,810	7.3	N/A		4th
1988	—					
1992	Fausto Moreno	66,507	2.0	N/A		7th
1996	Fausto Moreno	89,472	2.3	N/A		7th
1998	Maria Eugenia Lima	97,522	2.5	N/A		6th
2002	—					
2006	Luis Villacís	72,762	1.33	N/A		9th
2009	—					
2013	—					

=== Legislative elections ===
Election	Votes	%	Seats	+/–
1978-1979	139,572	9.71	1 / 69	New
1984	257,369	12.61	3 / 70	▲2
1988	163,562	5.84	2 / 72	▼1
1992	344,667	10.8	4 / 77	▲2
1996	303,890	8.7	2 / 82	▼2
1998	1,131,349	6.3	2 / 121	-
2002	?		3 / 100	▲1
2006	126,188	4.0	3 / 100	-
2009	2,766,276	4.29	5 / 124	▲2
2013 (Note: As a part of the alliance Plurinational Unity of the Lefts)	280,539	3.26%	5 / 137	-

== See also ==
- Marxist–Leninist Communist Party of Ecuador
