= Averroes Bucaram =

Ecuadorian politician (1954–2018)

Averroes Bucaram Záccida (14 October 1954 – 1 December 2018) was an Ecuadorian politician who was Speaker of National Congress (1985–1986, 1990) and MP (1984–1986, 1988–1992).

He was the son of presidential candidate Assad Bucaram and Olfa Perpetua Záccida and cousin of president Abdalá Bucaram and Martha Bucaram (married to president Jaime Roldós).
