= Luis Parodi =

Vice President of Ecuador (1936–2020)

Luis Parodi Valverde (12 August 1936 – 14 April 2020) was an politician of Ecuadorian ancestry, and engineer, who served as Vice President of Ecuador from August 1988 through August 1992. He was born in Guayaquil, Ecuador
