= Assad Bucaram =

Ecuadorian politician

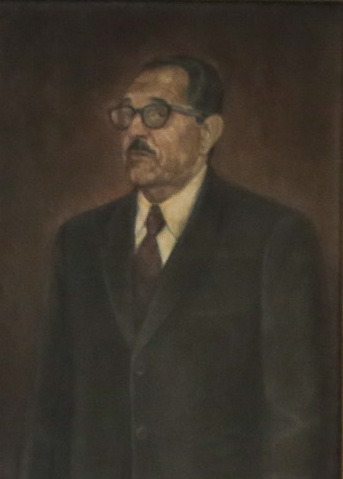
Assad Bucaram

Assad Bucaram Elmhalin (24 December 1916 – 5 November 1981) was an Ecuadorian politician who occupied positions as city Councilor and later of Mayor of Guayaquil (1962–1963, 1967–1970). He was elected a Deputy for the province of Guayaquil and was later appointed President of the National Assembly of Ecuador.

== Political career ==
The son of Lebanese immigrants Abdalá Bucaram Abi Karam and Martha Elmhalin, Bucaram had little formal education but had a highly successful business career that made him very wealthy. In 1961 he took over the ailing Concentración de Fuerzas Populares party (CFP), a party that up to that point had presented an anti-oligarchic but anti-communist ideology in a similar vein to Peronism, and turned it into a personal vehicle for his populist appeals. He threw his weight behind the Democratic Left Front for the 1968 elections, though this put him at odds with the José María Velasco Ibarra regime and from 1970 to 1972 he was exiled to Panama. He was equally at odds with the military regime that followed and was both exiled and briefly imprisoned for his outspoken opposition to the government.

Bucaram had intended to run for the presidency in the election of 1978-9 but was banned by the military government, ostensibly for his parents' nationality. The candidacy instead went to his niece's husband Jaime Roldós Aguilera and, with Bucaram's active support, the CFP carried the election after more than 18 years of de facto regimes. As a deputy and leader of the Congress, however, Bucaram became estranged from Roldós as he did not support the President's moves towards social democracy. He died in 1981.

== Personal life ==
He married Olfa Perpetua Záccida in 1948 when she was sixteen years old and fathered eight children with her: Omar, Olfa, Avicena, Averroes, Jorge, Cecilia, Juan and Teresa. Averroes Bucaram followed his father as both a CFP deputy and President of the National Congress. He was an uncle of Abdalá Bucaram who would become President of Ecuador after Assad's death. Abdalá's sister Martha Bucaram was the wife of President Roldós.
