= Frank Vargas Pazzos =

Ecuadorian Air Force general (born 1934)

Lieutenant General Frank Vargas Pazzos
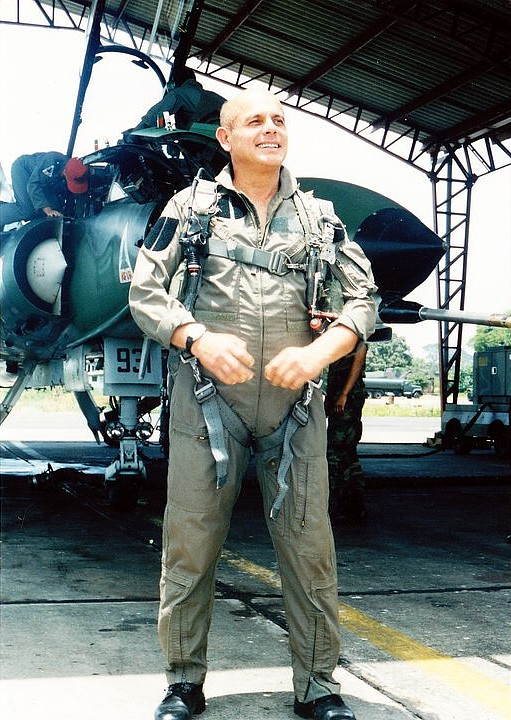
- Teniente General Frank Vargas Pazzos
- Born: July 18, 1934 (age 92); Chone, Manabí, Ecuador
- Military career
- Allegiance: Republic of Ecuador
- Branch: Ecuadorian Air Force
- Service years: 1955 – 1986
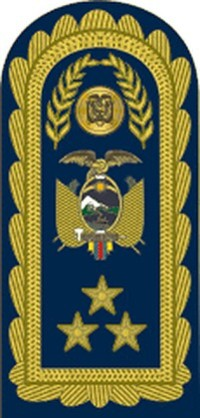
- Rank: Lieutenant General
- Nickname: El Loco (The Madman)
- Commands: Commandant of Second Air Zone, 1980–1983; Commander-in-chief of Ecuadorian Air Force, 1983-1986; Commander-in-chief of Joint Command of the Armed Forces of Ecuador, 1983–1986
- Conflicts: Armed uprising of Manta Air Base, March 7–11, 1986; Armed uprising of Quito Capital City Air Base, March 12–14, 1986; Kidnapping of the President León Febres Cordero by soldiers of the Ecuadorian Air Force in Taura Air Base, January 16–21, 1987
- Awards: Best graduate of the Institute of Diplomacy and International Studies at the University of Guayaquil, 1981; Great Cross of the Venezuelan Air Force, 1984
- Other work: Representative in National Congress of Ecuador, 1996; Minister of Government of Ecuador, 1997

Frank Vargas Pazzos (born July 15, 1934) is a former commander of the Ecuadorian Air Force (FAE). He also served as Chief of the Joint Armed Forces Command of Ecuador.

== Early life ==
He was born in Chone, into a landowning family from the province of Manabí, where he attended primary school and took part in the family's routine rural economic activities. He joined the Army College in 1955 and received his commission and pilot wings in 1957. His initial posting was to Guayaquil as a second Lieutenant, and he also served in Salinas and Taura. He qualified as a fighter pilot in the following aircraft: T-6 Texan, T-28 Trojan, Gloster Meteor, Strikemaster MK-89. He was also appointed as Air attaché in London, Commander of the Taura Air Base, Commander of the II Air Zone and Commander of the Ecuadorian Air Force. In 1983 he was appointed by president León Febres Cordero Chief of the Joint Staff of the Ecuadorian armed forces.

== Insubordination ==
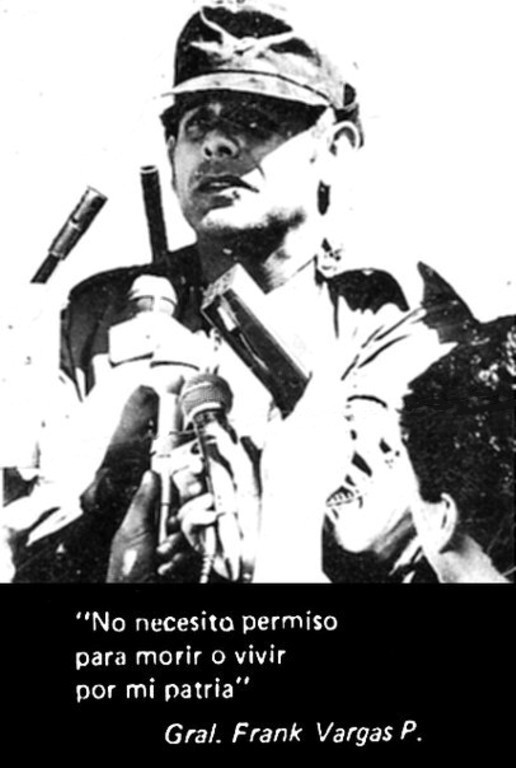
"I don't need permission to die or live for my country." Lieutenant General Frank Vargas Pazzos, 1986

In 1986 general Vargas aired in public grievances and denounced actions of the president's inner circle of power in the procurement of a Fokker F-28 aircraft for flag carrier TAME. Allegedly an overprice of almost six million dollars had been paid by an Ecuadorian company where the president's brother was a stockholder and his private secretary a former executive. When the president ordered his arrest, Vargas flew to the Air base of Manta using one of the Air force aircraft; in Manta many of the officers and enlisted personnel took a stronger stand and voiced calls for a coup d'état that would put Vargas as a member of a triumvirate the calls were not heeded and in hours of the evening president Febres Cordero went to the air bases in Guayaquil and Taura to call for the officers corps loyalty portraying General Vargas as a mental case. A video of the actions of the morning at Manta was shown to the officer corps in Taura that showed general Vargas in a state of inebriation and out of his normal self. In the morning of the following day general Vargas flew to the Air Base in Quito in an attempt to initiate a dialogue with officers of the Army and Navy. That night the army surrounded the air base and most of the air force troops walked out of the base abandoning Vargas, who was apprehended during the night in the attic of the PX building.

== "Taurazo" ==
After a legislative resolution of amnesty for Vargas that president Febres Cordero refused to publish in the Official Registry, tensions in the political landscape were high. During a routine visit of the president to Taura a group of commandos kidnapped the president, minister of defense, commander of the air force and several other high officials in order to negotiate for the release of general Vargas and an amnesty for the events of that day. As a result of the actions two of the president's protective detail were killed and several wounded. Many of the arrested officers were assaulted both verbally and physically. The country and the region were placed in a general alert and throughout the day many notable personalities attempted to negotiate a peaceful resolution. As the hours passed on many other technical and support elements of the base pleaded their support for the group of commandos who placed all the detainees inside an area under construction in the Base clinic and the president and his close lieutenants in the office of the base command. In the last hours of the evening the president had ordered by telephone the release of General Vargas and through his personal secretary in the capital Quito had authorized public statements of the events.

With the last hours of light, the detained officers were released and transported by bus to Guayaquil.

== Political career ==
=== Presidential runs ===
Upon his release, General Vargas joined a center-left political party called APRE, mainly because the party lacked candidates for the presidency. He was a candidate for the presidency in 1988, 1992, and 1996 for Partido Acción Popular Revolucionaria Ecuatoriana (APRE)

=== Vice presidential run ===
In the 2002 presidential election, he was a candidate for the Vice Presidency for Partido Roldosista Ecuatoriano (PRE), serving as running mate to Jacobo Bucaram, Abdalá's brother and also a politician himself in said political formation.
