= Democratic Left (Ecuador) =

Democratic Left Izquierda Democrática
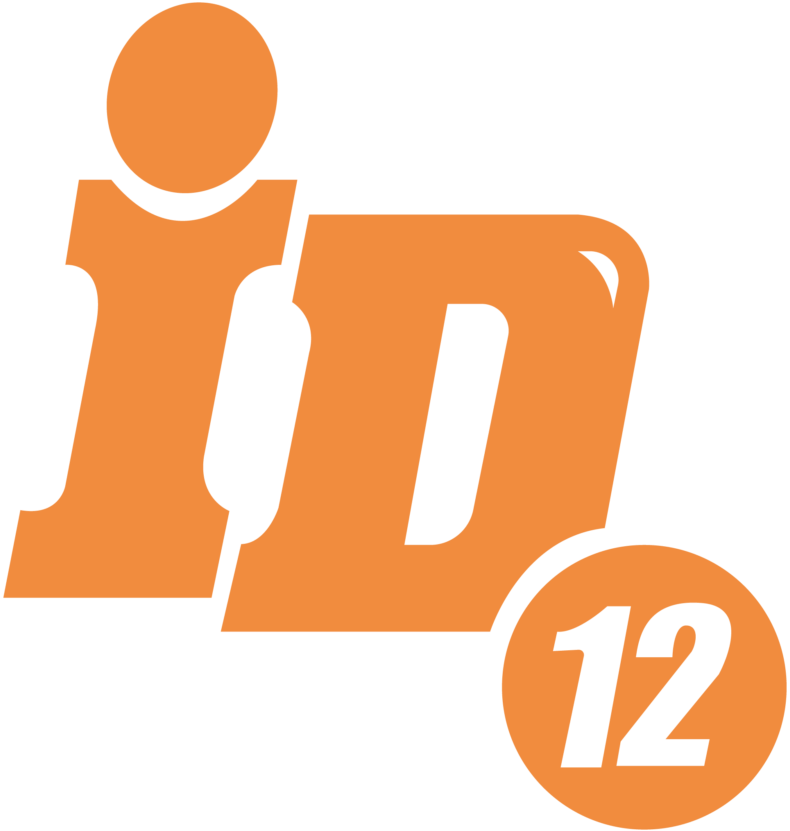
- Abbreviation: ID
- President: Enrique Chávez
- Spokesperson: Marlon Cadena
- Founder: Rodrigo Borja Cevallos
- Founded: 1970
- Split from: Ecuadorian Radical Liberal Party
- Membership: 181,804 (2022)
- Ideology: Social democracy
- Political position: Centre-left
- National affiliation: National Agreement for Change (2016–2017)
- Regional affiliation: COPPPAL
- International affiliation: Socialist International
- Colors: Orange
- Seats in the National Assembly: 0 / 137
- Prefects: 1 / 23
- Mayors: 10 / 221

Website
- http://izquierdademocratica.com/

The Democratic Left (Spanish: Izquierda Democrática, ID) is a social-democratic political party in Ecuador. It was founded in 1970 by the then congressman Rodrigo Borja Cevallos.

Ideologically, it identifies as a central goal to "achieve social justice with freedom in an innovative, just, egalitarian, equitable, fraternal, solidary, dynamic, progressive and decentralized society under the inspiration of the ideological principles of democratic socialism... and inserts itself in the international scene, in the center-left tendency".

The party's most significant electoral victory was in the period following Ecuador's restoration of democracy in 1979, during the 1988 Ecuadorian general election, with founder Borja Cevallos as its presidential nominee. Borja Cevallos served as president from 1988 until 1992. As of 2024, this remains the first and last time an ID candidate for the presidency was elected.

For the 1992 Ecuadorian general election, Cevallos was constitutionally prohibited from seeking re-election. As a result, the party nominated politician Raúl Baca Carbo, who had served as Minister of Social Welfare during the Cevallos administration, as their nominee for president. Carbo resigned from his cabinet position in 1991 to campaign for the presidency. Carbo was eliminated in the first round.

Rodrigo Borja Cevallos was selected as the party's nominee for the 1998 Ecuadorian general election, where he came in third place and was eliminated in the first round.

At the legislative elections, held on 20 October 2002, the party won at least 13 out of 100 seats. Its candidate, former president Rodrigo Borja, won 14.4% of the vote in the presidential elections of the same day.

For the October 2006 elections, it has entered into an alliance with the Ethics and Democracy Network (Red Etica y Democracia), to support the ticket formed by former Vice-President León Roldós, and Ramiro González, former Prefect of the Pichincha Canton. The party won 13 seats in Congress again, while its presidential ticket came in fourth place.

In the 2017 Ecuadorian general election, the party formed an alliance with the indigenist Pachakutik Plurinational Unity Movement – New Country and communist Popular Unity (Ecuador) parties, called the National Agreement for Change. The alliance nominated retired Ecuadorian Army general and politician Paco Moncayo as their presidential nominee. Moncayo was eliminated in the first round, and for the second round endorsed Guillermo Lasso.

For the 2021 Ecuadorian general election, ID nominated businessman Xavier Hervas as the party's presidential candidate. Despite being a newcomer to politics and being nationally unknown, Hervas came in fourth place in the first round. In the second round, Hervas endorsed Guillermo Lasso. In 2022, Hervas left the party due to disagreements with its leadership.

In April 2022, the party had thirteen members in the National Assembly after it excluded Johanna Moreira from the party.

For the 2023 Ecuadorian general election, the party supported the candidacy of Otto Sonnenholzner. For the second round, the party announced its support for Daniel Noboa. The party was left also without any representatives in the National Assembly, the result of an internal struggle within the party that remains unresolved.

For the 2025 Ecuadorian general election, the party designated businessman Carlos Rabascall as their presidential nominee. His pre-candidacy and nomination generated controversy within the party, as Rabascall was vice presidential nominee for the Correist Union for Hope ticket in the 2021 elections. As a result of Rabascall's nomination, a group of party members have threatened legal action and to take the case to the Constitutional Court of Ecuador. These ID members also denounce the party's leadership for altering the statutes of the party to allow Rabascall to become the nominee, as the previous statutes stipulate that persons participating in elections representing ID require at least two years of membership in the party.
