= Raúl Baca Carbo =

Ecuadorian engineer and politician

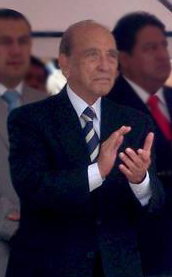
Image of Oswaldo Raúl Baca Carbo

Oswaldo Raúl Baca Carbo (June 29, 1931 – May 7, 2014) was an Ecuadorian engineer and politician. He is thought to be a historic leader of the Democratic Party of Ecuador. He was one of the most influential figures in Ecuadorian politics.

He was president of the National Congress on three occasions, in addition to being president of the Andean Parliament and the Latin American Parliament.

Baca was born in Quito, Ecuador. He died in Quito, Ecuador, aged 82.
