= Alfarista Radical Front =

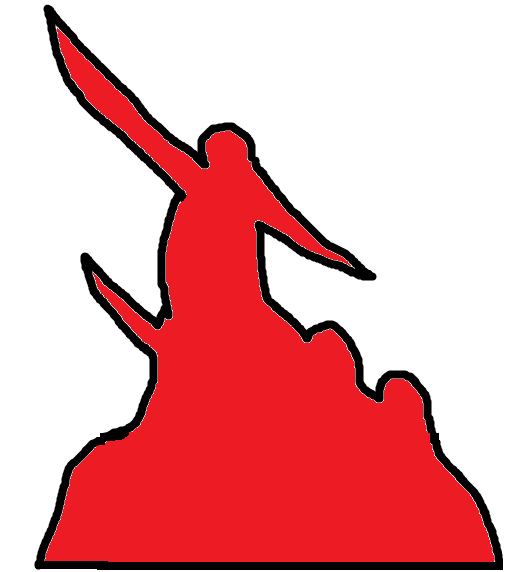
- Founded: 1972
- Dissolved: 2007
- Ideology: Liberalism; Radicalism (de jure)
- Political position: Centre to centre-right

The Alfarista Radical Front (Spanish: Frente Radical Alfarista, FRA) (Note: Also known as the Alfarista Liberation Army.) was a centrist liberal party in Ecuador, founded in 1972. One of its best known figures was former acting president Fabián Alarcón.

The party was named after the most prominent liberal politician in Ecuadorian history, Eloy Alfaro, who founded the country's first institutionalized Liberal Party in 1884.

In the 2002 Ecuadorian general election, the party supported the candidacy of Xavier Neira Menéndez.

== See also ==
- Liberalism
- Contributions to liberal theory
- Liberalism worldwide
- List of liberal parties
- Liberal democracy
- Liberalism and radicalism in Ecuador
