= Ecuadorian Socialist Party =

Political party in Ecuador

Ecuadorian Socialist Party Partido Socialista Ecuatoriano
- Abbreviation: PSE
- President: Enrique Ayala Mora
- General Secretary: Marcela Arellano Villa
- Founded: 1926
- Headquarters: Quito
- Youth wing: Juventud Socialista Ecuatoriana
- Women's wing: Frente de Mujeres Socialistas
- Membership (2016): 175,039
- Ideology: Democratic socialism Social democracy
- Political position: Center-left to left-wing
- National affiliation: United Front (2014–2018); Honesty Alliance (2020–2021)
- International affiliation: COPPPAL; São Paulo Forum
- National Assembly: 0 / 137 Including alliances

Website
- psocialista.ec

The Ecuadorian Socialist Party (Spanish: Partido Socialista Ecuatoriano) is a left-wing political party in Ecuador. It was founded in 1926 and reconstituted as the Socialist Party – Broad Front of Ecuador in 1995 after a merger with the Leftist Broad Front, the electoral wing of the Communist Party of Ecuador. It is the oldest continuously existent party in Ecuador.
