= Christian Democratic Union (Ecuador) =

Defunct political party in Ecuador

Christian Democratic Union Unión Demócrata Cristiana
- President: Carlos Larreátegui (last)
- Founded: 1977
- Dissolved: 2013
- Merger of: Factions of the Conservative Party and other minor parties
- Headquarters: Quito, Ecuador
- Ideology: Christian democracy Social democracy
- Political position: Centre-left
- International affiliation: Centrist Democrat International
- Regional affiliation: Christian Democrat Organization of America
- Colors: Green

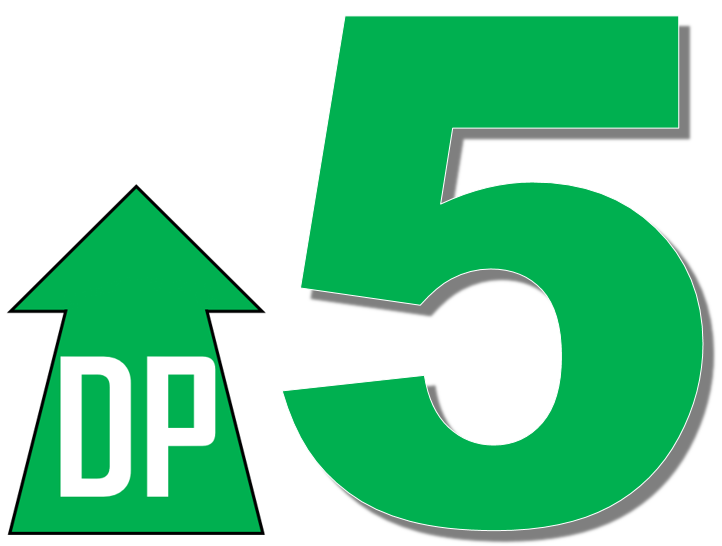
Logo as Popular Democracy

The Christian Democratic Union (Spanish: Unión Demócrata Cristiana, UDC), formerly known as Popular Democracy (Spanish: Democracia Popular, DP) was a Christian democratic political party in Ecuador. It was formed in the 1970s by centrist Christian Democrats who had left the Social Christian Party and the left wing of the Conservative Party who were oriented towards liberation theology. It officially registered as a political party in 1979. It was originally considered a centre-left party.

It reached its first great success in 1978 when party member Osvaldo Hurtado became the running mate on the successful presidential ticket of Jaime Roldós of the Concentration of People's Forces. Hurtado served as President of Ecuador from 1981 to 1984 due to Roldós's death in office. It was Ecuador's largest political party, having won 35% of the seats in the 1998 elections to the Congreso Nacional. In the 1998 presidential elections, party member Jamil Mahuad was elected president, and after a coup d'état and brief military rule, he was succeeded in 2000 by the vice-president, Gustavo Noboa, who was also in the party.

At the legislative elections, 20 October 2002, the party won 4 out of 100 seats. In 2006, it dropped the name of Popular Democracy and took the current one. At the elections, held in October 2006, it won 2 seats in the Congress. It had no presidential candidate.

The UDC was a member of the Christian Democrat Organization of America, continental organization of the Centrist Democrat International.

In 2013, the UDC was dissolved after the National Congress of the party.
