= National Congress (Ecuador) =

1984–2007 unicameral legislature of Ecuador

The National Congress (Spanish: Congreso Nacional) was the unicameral legislative branch of the government of Ecuador prior to November 2007.

Under the 1998 Constitution, Congress met in Quito and was made up of 100 deputies (diputados). Each of the country's 22 provinces returned a minimum of two deputies plus one additional seat for every 200,000 inhabitants.

It was dissolved on 29 November 2007 by the Ecuadorian Constituent Assembly and replaced by the National Assembly of Ecuador under the 2008 Constitution. Its demise came when it was already weakened by the disfavorable perception of the Ecuadorian public opinion, which for decades saw it as a corrupt and incompetent entity, as well as a venue for violent disputes between its members and political intrigues, such as the removal of Presidents Abdalá Bucaram in 1997 and Lucio Gutiérrez in 2005.

== Eligibility ==
To serve as a congressional deputy, the following requirements had to be met:

- Ecuadorian citizen by birth, not by naturalisation
- Having full enjoyment of political rights
- At least 25 years of age upon filing candidacy
- Native of the province represented, or resident thereof for at least three years immediately prior to the election

== See also ==
- List of presidents of the National Congress of Ecuador
- National Assembly of Ecuador
