= Concentration of People's Forces =

Political party in Ecuador

Concentration of People's Forces Concentración de Fuerzas Populares
- Founder: Assad Bucaram
- Founded: 1949
- Dissolved: 2014
- Succeeded by: Ecuadorian Roldosist Party
- Headquarters: Guayaquil
- Ideology: Populism; Progressivism
- Political position: Centre-left

The Concentration of People's Forces (Spanish: Concentración de Fuerzas Populares, CFP) was a populist political party in Ecuador. It was founded in 1949 and played a major role in Ecuadorian politics of the 1960s and 1970s, with its stronghold being in Guayaquil. Jaime Roldós Aguilera, a member of the party, was the country's president from 1979 to 1981. Since the end of the 1980s, it has fallen into insignificance.

Under the leadership of Assad Bucaram it was one of Ecuador's largest parties in the 1960s and 1970s. CFP's Jaime Roldós (the husband of Bucaram's niece) became the first freely-elected president of Ecuador after the rule of the military juntas in the 1970s.

Though the Bucaram family and members of Roldós's own family continued in politics, they changed allegiance to other parties and the CFP was weakened.

In the legislative elections, of 20 October 2002, the party won 1 out of 100 seats. This party might not have won any seats in the 2006 elections, and in the 2014 they risk losing official financing. Its presidential candidate, Jaime Damerval, won 0.4% of the vote in 2006.

== See also ==
- Miriam Estrada-Castillo
