= List of presidents of Ecuador =

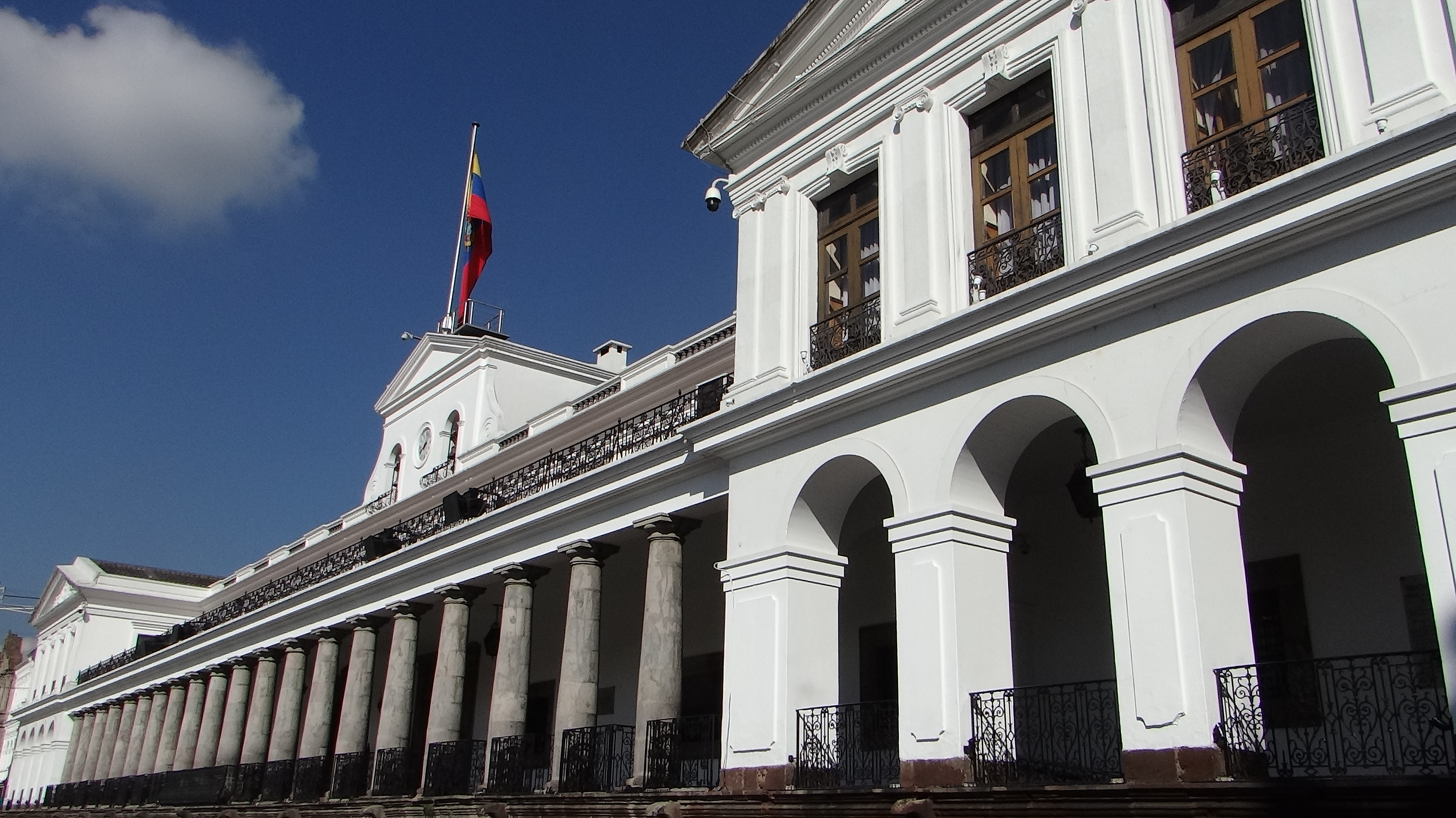
The Carondelet Palace, the presidential residence since the dissolution of Gran Colombia in 1830.

This article contains a list of presidents of Ecuador, since the independence from Gran Colombia (1830) to the present day.

== Background ==
Juan José Flores was the first constitutional president of Ecuador, declaring the separation of the State of Ecuador from Gran Colombia, maintaining its presidential government structure, which has remained until the present day. Between 1830 and 1845, the office of President of the Republic was elected indirectly, that is, through the legislature. The first presidents were mostly elected through Constituent Assemblies, a tradition in the politics of Ecuador which remained until 1967, with Otto Arosemena being the last constitutional president elected through the Constituent Assembly. This is one of the reasons why Ecuador has had 20 Constitutions since its foundation, many of them created with the intention of legitimizing the government of a president. Since 1869, the president is elected by popular vote; however, it should be borne in mind that during the 19th century, Ecuador lived a census democracy: only men with sufficient income and decent office voted, being Francisco Robles the first president elected by direct vote.

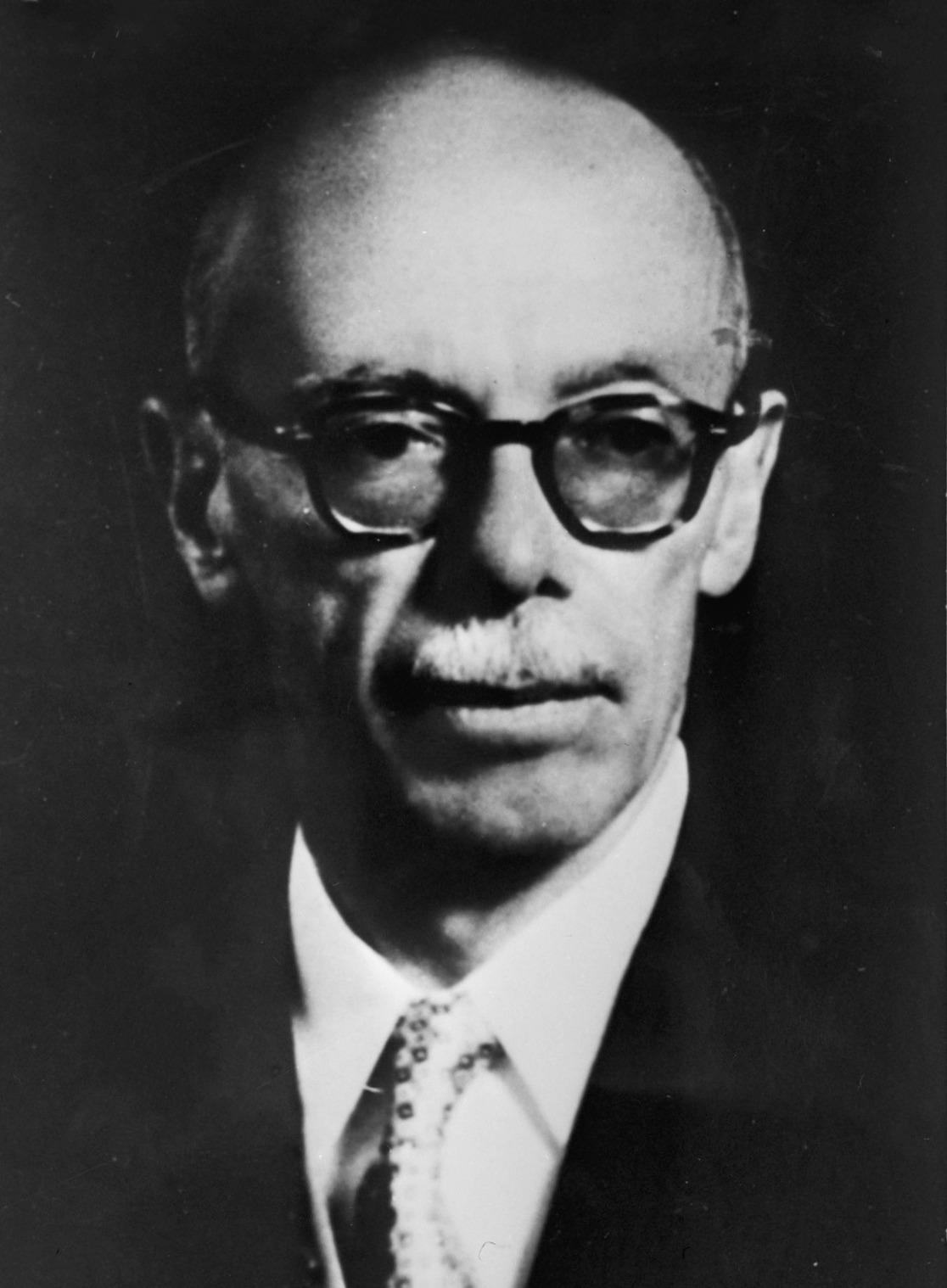
José María Velasco Ibarra, the longest-serving president of Ecuador.

Between 1906 and 1944, during the Liberal Revolution, the elections were held in a generally fraudulent or corrupt manner, so the year 1944 is estimated as the beginning of democracy in Ecuador. Between 1906 and 1947, there was no office of Vice President. Between 1947 and 1970, the president and vice president were elected separately. Since 1979, the president and vice president are elected by direct suffrage on the same ballot. Since 1998, a candidate who obtains more than 40% of votes can also win, provided he has a difference of at least 10% over the second candidate. All these percentages are calculated on the total valid votes (that is, without counting null and blank votes).

The history of Ecuador has been full of instability, usually centered on the figure of the President of the Republic, which is why Ecuador's political culture has been traditionally called caudillista. During the 19th century, the country was torn apart twice after the overthrow of the presidents Francisco Robles and Ignacio de Veintemilla, with regional governments seeking access to national power. Until 1947, the majority of the constitutional presidents of the Republic came to power through coups d'état, exercising dictatorial power which would be legitimized through the implementation of new constitutions, so that the governance and stability of the presidents has been usually weak, which is why there has been many presiding and interim presidents. There were two military dictatorships in the country (1963–1966 and 1972–1979) before democracy returned with the election of Jaime Roldós Aguilera. From 1996 to 2005, 3 constitutional presidents were overthrown (Abdalá Bucaram, Jamil Mahuad and Lucio Gutiérrez). The left-wing populist government of Rafael Correa (2007–2017) has been the most stable in national history, being able to remain in power constitutionally without interruptions for 10 years and 4 months. José María Velasco Ibarra is the longest-serving president since he held office for a total of 12 years, 10 months and 6 days and was elected President 5 times (1934–35, 1944–47, 1952–56, 1960–61 and 1968–1972).

== List of presidents ==
Legend:

Independent politician Conservative Party Armed Forces of Ecuador Republican Union Party Ecuadorian Radical Liberal Party National Democratic Civic Movement Velaquista National Federation Social Christian Party Institutionalist Democratic Coalition	Concentration of People's Forces Popular Democracy Democratic Left Republican Unity Party Ecuadorian Roldosist Party Alfarista Radical Front Patriotic Society Party PAIS Alliance Creating Opportunities National Democratic Action

No.	Portrait	Name (Birth–Death)	Term of office			Political party	Elected	Cabinet	Ref.
No.	Portrait	Name (Birth–Death)	Took office	Left office	Time in office	Political party	Elected	Cabinet	Ref.
Presidents of the State of Ecuador (1830–1835)
—		Juan José Flores (1800–1864)	3 May 1830	14 August 1830	103 days	Independent	—	Flores I	
1		Juan José Flores (1800–1864)	14 August 1830	10 September 1834	4 years, 27 days	Independent	1830	Flores I	
2		Vicente Rocafuerte (1783–1847)	10 September 1834	8 August 1835	332 days	Independent	—	Rocafuerte	
Presidents of the Republic of Ecuador (1835–present)
(2)		Vicente Rocafuerte (1783–1847)	8 August 1835	31 January 1839	3 years, 176 days	Independent	1835	Rocafuerte	
(1)		Juan José Flores (1800–1864)	1 February 1839	6 March 1845 (deposed)	6 years, 136 days	Independent	1839	Flores II	
(1)		Juan José Flores (1800–1864)	1 February 1839	6 March 1845 (deposed)	6 years, 136 days	Independent	1843	Flores III	
—		José Joaquín de Olmedo (1780–1847); President of the triumvirate	6 March 1845	8 December 1845	174 days	Independent	—	Provisional	
3		Vicente Ramón Roca (1792–1858)	8 December 1845	15 October 1849	3 years, 311 days	Independent	1843	Roca	
—		Manuel de Ascásubi (1804–1876) acting	15 October 1849	7 December 1850	1 year, 53 days	Independent	—	Ascásubi I	
—		Diego Noboa (1789–1870)	8 December 1850	25 February 1851	79 days	Independent	—	D. Noboa	
4		Diego Noboa (1789–1870)	25 February 1851	12 September 1851	199 days	Independent	1851	D. Noboa	
5		José María Urvina (1808–1891)	24 July 1851	17 July 1852	359 days	Independent	—	Urvina	
5		José María Urvina (1808–1891)	17 July 1852	15 October 1856	4 years, 90 days	Independent	1852	Urvina	
6		Francisco Robles (1811–1893)	16 October 1856	31 August 1859	2 years, 319 days	Independent	1856	Robles	
—		Gabriel García Moreno (1821–1875)	17 January 1861	2 April 1861	75 days	Conservative Party	—	Moreno I	
7		Gabriel García Moreno (1821–1875)	2 April 1861	30 August 1865	4 years, 150 days	Conservative Party	1861	Moreno I	
—		Rafael Carvajal (1818–1881) acting	31 August 1865	7 September 1865	7 days	Conservative Party	—	Moreno I	
8		Jerónimo Carrión (1804–1873)	7 September 1865	6 November 1867	2 years, 60 days	Conservative Party	1865	Carrión	
—		Pedro José de Arteta (1797–1873) acting	7 November 1867	20 January 1868	74 days	Conservative Party	—	Arteta	
9		Javier Espinosa (1815–1870)	20 January 1868	19 January 1869	365 days	Conservative Party	1868	Espinosa	
—		Gabriel García Moreno (1821–1875) acting	19 January 1869	19 May 1869	120 days	Conservative Party	—	Moreno II	
—		Manuel de Ascásubi (1804–1876) acting	19 May 1869	10 August 1869	83 days	Conservative Party	—	Ascásubi II	
(7)		Gabriel García Moreno (1821–1875)	10 August 1869	6 August 1875 †	5 years, 361 days	Conservative Party	1869	Moreno III	
(7)		Gabriel García Moreno (1821–1875)	10 August 1869	6 August 1875 †	5 years, 361 days	Conservative Party	1875 (May)	Moreno III	
—		Francisco Xavier León (1832–1880) acting	6 August 1875	15 September 1875	40 days	Conservative Party	—	León	
—		José Javier Eguiguren (1816–1884) acting	15 September 1875	9 December 1875	85 days	Conservative Party	—	Eguiguren	
10		Antonio Borrero (1827–1911)	9 December 1875	18 December 1876	1 year, 9 days	Conservative Party	1875 (Oct.)	A. Borrero	
11		Ignacio de Veintemilla (1828–1908)	18 December 1876	26 January 1878	1 year, 39 days	Military	—	Veintemilla	
11		Ignacio de Veintemilla (1828–1908)	21 April 1878	26 March 1882	3 years, 339 days	Military	1878	Veintemilla	
11		Ignacio de Veintemilla (1828–1908)	26 March 1882	9 July 1883	1 year, 105 days	Military	—	Veintemilla	
—		Luis Cordero Crespo (1833–1912); Government of the Restoration	1 July 1892	16 April 1895	2 years, 289 days	Republican Union Party	—	Restoration	
—		José Plácido Caamaño (1837–1900)	15 October 1883	10 February 1884	118 days	Conservative Party	—	Caamaño	
12		José Plácido Caamaño (1837–1900)	10 February 1884	30 June 1888	4 years, 141 days	Conservative Party	1884	Caamaño	
—		Pedro José Cevallos (1830–1892) acting	1 July 1888	17 August 1888	47 days	Conservative Party	—	Caamaño	
13		Antonio Flores Jijón (1833–1915)	17 August 1888	10 June 1892	3 years, 298 days	Republican Union Party	1888	Jijón	
14		Luis Cordero Crespo (1833–1912)	1 July 1892	16 April 1895	2 years, 289 days	Republican Union Party	1892	Crespo	
—		Vicente Lucio Salazar (1832–1896) acting	16 April 1895	5 June 1895	50 days	Conservative Party	—	Salazar	
15		Eloy Alfaro (1842–1912)	5 June 1895	9 October 1896	1 year, 126 days	Ecuadorian Radical Liberal Party	—	Alfaro I	
15		Eloy Alfaro (1842–1912)	9 October 1896	31 August 1901	4 years, 326 days	Ecuadorian Radical Liberal Party	1897	Alfaro I	
16		Leónidas Plaza (1865–1932)	1 September 1901	31 August 1905	4 years	Ecuadorian Radical Liberal Party	1901	Plaza I	
17		Lizardo García (1844–1937)	1 September 1905	15 January 1906	136 days	Ecuadorian Radical Liberal Party	1905	García	
(15)		Eloy Alfaro (1842–1912)	16 January 1906	9 October 1906	266 days	Ecuadorian Radical Liberal Party	—	Alfaro II	
(15)		Eloy Alfaro (1842–1912)	9 October 1906	11 August 1911	4 years, 306 days	Ecuadorian Radical Liberal Party	1906	Alfaro II	
—		Carlos Freile Zaldumbide (1851–1928) acting	11 August 1911	31 August 1911	20 days	Ecuadorian Radical Liberal Party	—	Zaldumbide I	
18		Emilio Estrada (1855–1911)	1 September 1911	21 December 1911	111 days	Ecuadorian Radical Liberal Party	1911	Estrada	
—		Carlos Freile Zaldumbide (1851–1928) acting	22 December 1911	5 March 1912	74 days	Ecuadorian Radical Liberal Party	—	Zaldumbide II	
—		Francisco Andrade Marín (1841–1935) acting	6 March 1912	1 August 1912	148 days	Ecuadorian Radical Liberal Party	—	Marín	
—		Alfredo Baquerizo (1859–1951) acting	1 August 1912	1 September 1912	31 days	Ecuadorian Radical Liberal Party	—	Baquerizo I	
(16)		Leónidas Plaza (1865–1932)	1 September 1912	31 August 1916	4 years	Ecuadorian Radical Liberal Party	1912	Plaza II	
19		Alfredo Baquerizo (1859–1951)	1 September 1916	31 August 1920	4 years	Ecuadorian Radical Liberal Party	1916	Baquerizo II	
20		José Luis Tamayo (1858–1947)	1 September 1920	31 August 1924	4 years	Ecuadorian Radical Liberal Party	1920	Tamayo	
21		Gonzalo Córdova (1863–1928)	1 September 1924	9 July 1925	311 days	Ecuadorian Radical Liberal Party	1924	Córdova	
		First Provisional Government collective leadership	10 July 1925	6 January 1926	180 days		—	Provisional I	
		Second Provisional Government collective leadership	10 January 1926	31 March 1926	80 days		—	Provisional II	
—		Isidro Ayora (1879–1978)	3 April 1926	17 April 1929	3 years, 14 days	Ecuadorian Radical Liberal Party	—	Ayora	
22		Isidro Ayora (1879–1978)	17 April 1929	24 August 1931	2 years, 129 days	Ecuadorian Radical Liberal Party	1929	Ayora	
—		Luis Larrea Alba (1894–1979) acting	24 August 1931	15 October 1931	52 days	Ecuadorian Radical Liberal Party	—	Alba	
—		Alfredo Baquerizo (1859–1951) acting	15 October 1931	28 August 1932	318 days	Ecuadorian Radical Liberal Party	—	Baquerizo III	
—		Carlos Freile Larrea (1876–1942) acting	28 August 1932	1 September 1932	4 days	Ecuadorian Radical Liberal Party	—	Larrea	
—		Alberto Guerrero Martínez (1878–1941) acting	2 September 1932	4 December 1932	93 days	Ecuadorian Radical Liberal Party	—	Martínez	
23		Juan de Dios Martínez (1875–1955)	5 December 1932	19 October 1933	318 days	Ecuadorian Radical Liberal Party	1932	J. Martínez	
—		Abelardo Montalvo (1876–1950) acting	20 October 1933	31 August 1934	315 days	Ecuadorian Radical Liberal Party	—	Montalvo	
24		José María Velasco Ibarra (1893–1979)	1 September 1934	21 August 1935	354 days	Independent	1934	Ibarra I	
—		Antonio Pons (1897–1980) acting	21 August 1935	25 September 1935	35 days	Conservative Party	—	Pons	
—		Federico Páez (1877–1974); Jefe Supremo	26 September 1935	23 October 1937	2 years, 27 days	Independent	—	Páez	
—		Alberto Enríquez Gallo (1894–1962); Jefe Supremo	23 October 1937	10 August 1938	291 days	Military	—	Gallo	
—		Manuel María Borrero (1883–1975) acting	10 August 1938	1 December 1938	113 days	Ecuadorian Radical Liberal Party	—	M. Borrero	
25		Aurelio Mosquera (1883–1939)	2 December 1938	17 November 1939	350 days	Ecuadorian Radical Liberal Party	1938	Mosquera	
—		Carlos Alberto Arroyo del Río (1893–1969) acting	18 November 1939	10 December 1939	22 days	Ecuadorian Radical Liberal Party	—	Río I	
—		Andrés Córdova (1892–1983) acting	11 December 1939	10 August 1940	243 days	Ecuadorian Radical Liberal Party	—	Córdova	
—		Julio Enrique Moreno (1879–1952) acting	10 August 1940	31 August 1940	21 days	Ecuadorian Radical Liberal Party	—	J. Moreno	
26		Carlos Alberto Arroyo del Río (1893–1969)	1 September 1940	28 May 1944	3 years, 270 days	Ecuadorian Radical Liberal Party	1940	Río II	
—		Julio Teodoro Salem (1900–1968) acting	29 May 1944	31 May 1944	2 days	Ecuadorian Radical Liberal Party	—	Democratic Alliance	
(24)		José María Velasco Ibarra (1893–1979)	1 June 1944	23 August 1947	3 years, 83 days	Independent	1944	Ibarra II	
(24)		José María Velasco Ibarra (1893–1979)	1 June 1944	23 August 1947	3 years, 83 days	Independent	1946	Ibarra III	
—		Carlos Mancheno Cajas (1902–1996); Jefe Supremo	23 August 1947	2 September 1947	10 days	Military	—	Cajas	
27		Mariano Suárez Veintimilla (1897–1980)	2 September 1947	17 September 1947	15 days	Conservative Party	1946	Veintimilla	
28		C. J. Arosemena Tola (1888–1952)	17 September 1947	31 August 1948	349 days	Independent	1947	Tola	
29		Galo Plaza (1906–1987)	1 September 1948	31 August 1952	4 years	National Democratic Civic Movement	1948	G. Plaza	
(24)		José María Velasco Ibarra (1893–1979)	1 September 1952	31 August 1956	4 years	Velaquista National Federation	1952	Ibarra IV	
30		Camilo Ponce Enríquez (1912–1976)	1 September 1956	31 August 1960	4 years	Social Christian Party	1956	Enríquez	
(24)		José María Velasco Ibarra (1893–1979)	1 September 1960	7 November 1961	1 year, 67 days	Velaquista National Federation	1960	Ibarra V	
31		C. J. Arosemena Monroy (1919–2004)	7 November 1961	11 July 1963	1 year, 246 days	Independent	—	Monroy	
—		Admiral; Ramón Castro Jijón (1915–1984); Chairman of the Military Junta of 1963	11 July 1963	29 March 1966	2 years, 261 days	Military	—	Military Junta	
—		General; Telmo Vargas (1912–2013); Acting Chairman of the Military Junta of 1963	29 March 1966	29 March 1966	0 days	Military	—	Military Junta	
–		Clemente Yerovi (1904–1981) acting	30 March 1966	16 November 1966	231 days	Institutionalist Democratic Coalition	—	Yerovi	
—		Otto Arosemena (1925–1984)	16 November 1966	25 May 1967	190 days	Institutionalist Democratic Coalition	—	Arosemena	
32		Otto Arosemena (1925–1984)	25 May 1967	31 August 1968	1 year, 98 days	Institutionalist Democratic Coalition	—	Arosemena	
(24)		José María Velasco Ibarra (1893–1979)	1 September 1968	15 February 1972	3 years, 167 days	Velaquista National Federation	1968	Ibarra VI	
—		General; Guillermo Rodríguez Lara (born 1923); Chairman of the Council of Government	15 February 1972	11 January 1976	3 years, 330 days	Military	—	Council of Government	
—		Vice Admiral; Alfredo Poveda (1926–1990); President of the Supreme Council of Government	11 January 1976	10 August 1979	3 years, 211 days	Military	—	Supreme Council	
33		Jaime Roldós Aguilera (1940–1981)	10 August 1979	24 May 1981	1 year, 287 days	Concentration of People's Forces	1979	Roldós	
34		Osvaldo Hurtado (born 1939)	24 May 1981	10 August 1984	3 years, 78 days	Popular Democracy	—	Hurtado	
35		León Febres Cordero (1931–2008)	10 August 1984	10 August 1988	4 years	Social Christian Party	1984	Febres Cordero	
36		Rodrigo Borja Cevallos (1935–2025)	10 August 1988	10 August 1992	4 years	Democratic Left	1988	Borja	
37		Sixto Durán Ballén (1921–2016)	10 August 1992	10 August 1996	4 years	Republican Unity Party	1992	Duran Ballén	
38		Abdalá Bucaram (born 1952)	10 August 1996	6 February 1997	180 days	Ecuadorian Roldosist Party	1996	Bucaram	
—		Fabián Alarcón (born 1947) acting	6 February 1997	9 February 1997	3 days	Alfarista Radical Front	—		
39		Rosalía Arteaga (born 1956)	9 February 1997	11 February 1997	2 days	MIRA Movement	—	R. Arteaga	
40		Fabián Alarcón (born 1947)	11 February 1997	10 August 1998	1 year, 180 days	Alfarista Radical Front	—	Alarcón	
41		Jamil Mahuad (born 1949)	10 August 1998	21 January 2000	1 year, 164 days	Popular Democracy	1998	Mahuad	
42		Gustavo Noboa (1937–2021)	22 January 2000	15 January 2003	2 years, 358 days	Independent	—	G. Noboa	
43		Lucio Gutiérrez (born 1957)	15 January 2003	20 April 2005	2 years, 95 days	Patriotic Society Party	2002	Gutiérrez	
44		Alfredo Palacio (1939–2025)	20 April 2005	15 January 2007	1 year, 270 days	Independent	—	Palacio	
45		Rafael Correa (born 1963)	15 January 2007	24 May 2017	10 years, 129 days	PAIS Alliance	2006	Correa I	
45		Rafael Correa (born 1963)	15 January 2007	24 May 2017	10 years, 129 days	PAIS Alliance	2009	Correa II	
45		Rafael Correa (born 1963)	15 January 2007	24 May 2017	10 years, 129 days	PAIS Alliance	2013	Correa III	
46		Lenín Moreno (born 1953)	24 May 2017	24 May 2021	4 years	PAIS Alliance	2017	L. Moreno	
47		Guillermo Lasso (born 1955)	24 May 2021	23 November 2023	2 years, 183 days	Creating Opportunities	2021	Lasso	
48		Daniel Noboa (born 1987)	23 November 2023	Incumbent	2 years, 347 days	National Democratic Action	2023	D. Noboa I	
48		Daniel Noboa (born 1987)	23 November 2023	Incumbent	2 years, 347 days	National Democratic Action	2025	D. Noboa II	

== Rival governments in rebellion ==
Picture	Name	Began	Ended	Title(s)
	Vicente Rocafuerte	20 October 1833	July 1834	Jefe Supremo of the Department of the Guayas
	José Félix Valdivieso	13 July 1834	18 January 1835	Jefe Supremo
	José Joaquín de Olmedo	6 March 1845	18 June 1845	President of the Provisional Government
	Antonio de Elizalde	March 1850	1850	Jefe Supremo
	Diego Noboa	20 February 1850	10 June 1850	Jefe Supremo
	José María Urvina	13 July 1851	17 July 1851	Jefe Supremo
	Provisional Government	1 May 1859	4 June 1859	Members: Gabriel García Moreno (from May 25); Manuel Gómez de la Torre (to May 25); José María Avilés; Pacífico Chiriboga
	Jerónimo Carrión	6 June 1859	1859	
	Gabriel García Moreno	4 June 1859	17 September 1861	Jefe Supremo
	Guillermo Franco	17 September 1859	24 September 1860	Jefe Supremo of Guayas and Azuay
	Fernando Daquilema	18 de diciembre de 1871	8 de abril de 1872	King Shyri XVII
	Ignacio de Veintemilla	8 September 1876	19 December 1876	Jefe Supremo
	Eloy Alfaro	February 1883	11 October 1883	Jefe Supremo of Manabí and Esmeraldas
	Provisional Government	14 January 1883	9 July 1883	Members: José María Sarasti; Pedro Ignacio Lizarzaburu; Agustín Guerrero; Luis Cordero Crespo (from February 14); Pablo Herrera (to February 14); Rafael Pérez Pareja
	Pedro Carbo	17 September 1883	11 October 1883	Jefe Supremo of Guayas
	Eloy Alfaro	19 June 1895	23 August 1895	Jefe Supremo
	Flavio E. Alfaro Santana	22 December 1911	January 1912	
	Pedro Jacinto Montero Maridueña	28 December 1911	21 January 1912	

== See also ==
- President of Ecuador
- History of Ecuador
