= History of Ecuador (1925–1944) =

Overview of the history of Ecuador, 1925–1944

Republic of Ecuador República del Ecuador
- 1925–1944
- Flag Coat of arms
- Motto: "Dios, patria y libertad"
- Anthem: Salve, Oh Patria
- Capital: Quito
- Government: Presidential republic
- President
  - 1926–1931: Isidro Ayora
  - 1931–1932: Alfredo Baquerizo
  - 1932–1933: Juan de Dios Martínez
  - 1933–1934: Abelardo Montalvo
  - 1934–1935: José María Velasco Ibarra
  - 1935–1937: Federico Páez
  - 1937–1938: Alberto Enríquez Gallo
  - 1938–1939: Aurelio Mosquera
  - 1939–1940: Andrés Córdova
  - 1940–1944: Carlos Alberto Arroyo del Río
- Legislature: National Congress
- History
  - Established: 10 July 1925
  - Disestablished: 31 May 1944
Preceded by	Succeeded by
Ecuador	Peruvian occupation of Ecuador; Ecuador
- Today part of: Ecuador; Peru

This is a summary of the history of Ecuador from 1925 to 1944.

The reformist officers initially named a governing junta consisting of prominent opponents of the Liberal plutocracy, but neither it nor a succeeding junta was able to consolidate the power necessary to govern effectively. In 1926 they named as provisional president Isidro Ayora, a dedicated reformer who, although married into one of the wealthiest coastal families, possessed a social conscience and the vision to see that reform would help preserve the status of the upper classes. Ayora quickly assumed dictatorial powers, with which he set out to institute reforms that were partly of his own making and partly the making of the League of Young Officers.

An advisory mission from Princeton University, headed by Edwin W. Kemmerer, was invited to propose measures to reorganize Ecuador's fiscal and monetary structures. Its major accomplishment was the creation of the Central Bank of Ecuador, which replaced the private banks' authority in the issuing of currency; in addition, the Kemmerer mission also reorganized the state budgeting and customs agencies. The appropriation of these functions, which were previously under the control of la Argonaut, brought a revenue windfall to the government during the next half-decade. In addition to building state fiscal and social agencies, the funds were used to initiate a number of programs, including pensions for state workers, that enhanced the security of the middle and lower economic sectors of the population. A range of social legislation—quite progressive for its day—intended to protect the working class from unscrupulous employers and to improve working conditions emerged from the enactment of the 1929 constitution.

The same constitution, Ecuador's thirteenth in just under a century as a republic, also provided for a powerful legislative body with authority to censure presidential ministers. This diminution of executive power, the appearance of a wide variety (socialist, communist, and populist) of new groupings in political competition with the traditional parties and with the military, and the devastating effects of the Great Depression combined to make Ecuador's political record especially unstable during subsequent years. Ayora was the first of fourteen chief executives during the 1930s.

World demand for cacao and other Ecuadorian export crops dropped precipitously in the wake of the Wall Street crash of 1929: export crop value fell from US$15 million in 1928 to US$7 million in 1931 and US$5 million in 1932, causing widespread unemployment and misery. Few objections were voiced in 1931 when Ayora was the victim of a military coup. Neptalí Bonifaz Ascázubi was then elected with the help of a quasi-fascist grouping of the serrano lower classes called the Consolidation of National Workers (Compactación Obrera Nacional). In August 1932, after various Liberal and leftist elements in Congress blocked Bonifaz's assumption of power, the Compactación fought a bloody four-day civil war against other paramilitary forces amassed by opponents of the president-elect. The latter were victorious, largely because the great majority of the government military forces remained in their barracks rather than defend Bonifaz.

Another election two months later brought victory for the Liberal candidate, Juan de Dios Martínez Mera, but soon accusations arose that the election had been fraudulent. The congressional opposition censured virtually every minister as soon as he was named and also encouraged the Compactación to lead demonstrations against the president in the streets of Quito. The campaign against Martínez was led by the charismatic president of the Chamber of Deputies, José María Velasco Ibarra, who at the time professed a "total lack of presidential ambitions." In September 1934, less than a year after Martínez was forced to resign, Velasco assumed the presidency after having won popular elections by an overwhelming margin.

The first of Velasco's five periods as president lasted only eleven months. He was overthrown by the military after attempting to assume dictatorial powers by dissolving Congress and jailing his congressional opponents. Shortly thereafter, the military placed Federico Páez Chiriboga in the presidential palace. An engineer and former senator, Páez ruled precariously for two years, first with the political support of the socialist left and then with that of the right, and he tried to advance the reforms undertaken by Ayora a decade earlier. Ongoing fiscal difficulties severely limited Páez's efforts, however, and in September 1937 he was overthrown by his minister of national defense, General Alberto Enríquez Gallo. Although he ruled for less than a year, Enríquez achieved note as a social reformer by his promulgation of the Labor Code of 1938.

Enríquez is also remembered for having initiated a protracted confrontation with the United States–based South American Development Company over the terms of its Ecuadorian concession and the wages it paid its Ecuadorian employees. The company refused to comply with Enríquez's entreaty that more of the profits from its mining operations stay in Ecuador, and it won the support of the United States Department of State. The Ecuadorian government continued its demands despite United States pressure. In 1940 the United States, hoping to obtain Ecuadorian cooperation in its anticipated war effort, ended its support for the mining firm. Ecuadorian President Carlos Alberto Arroyo del Río, in turn, proved generous in his cooperation with the Allies, allowing the United States to build a naval base on the Galápagos Islands and an air base at Salinas on the Ecuadorian mainland.

In addition to being a genuine friend and admirer of the United States, Arroyo del Río was the leader of the PLR and a representative of the Guayaquil-based "plutocracy." He came to power constitutionally in November 1939 upon the death of his predecessor, but he continued in office in January 1940 through fraudulent elections that were universally believed to have been won by Velasco, and continued in power later, through repression. Despite such antipopular methods of ruling, he managed to remain in office for almost four years, thanks to economic support by the United States and the recuperation of Ecuador's export markets as worldwide economic depression gave way to recovery during World War II.

== Ecuadorian–Peruvian War ==
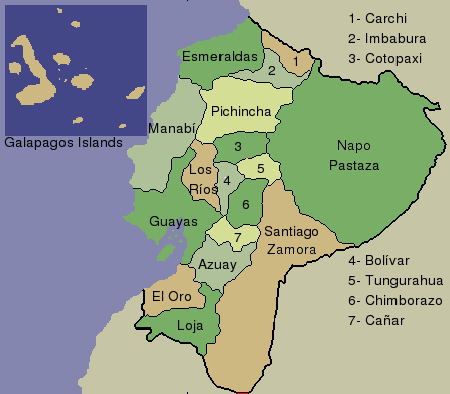
Ecuador after the war with Peru

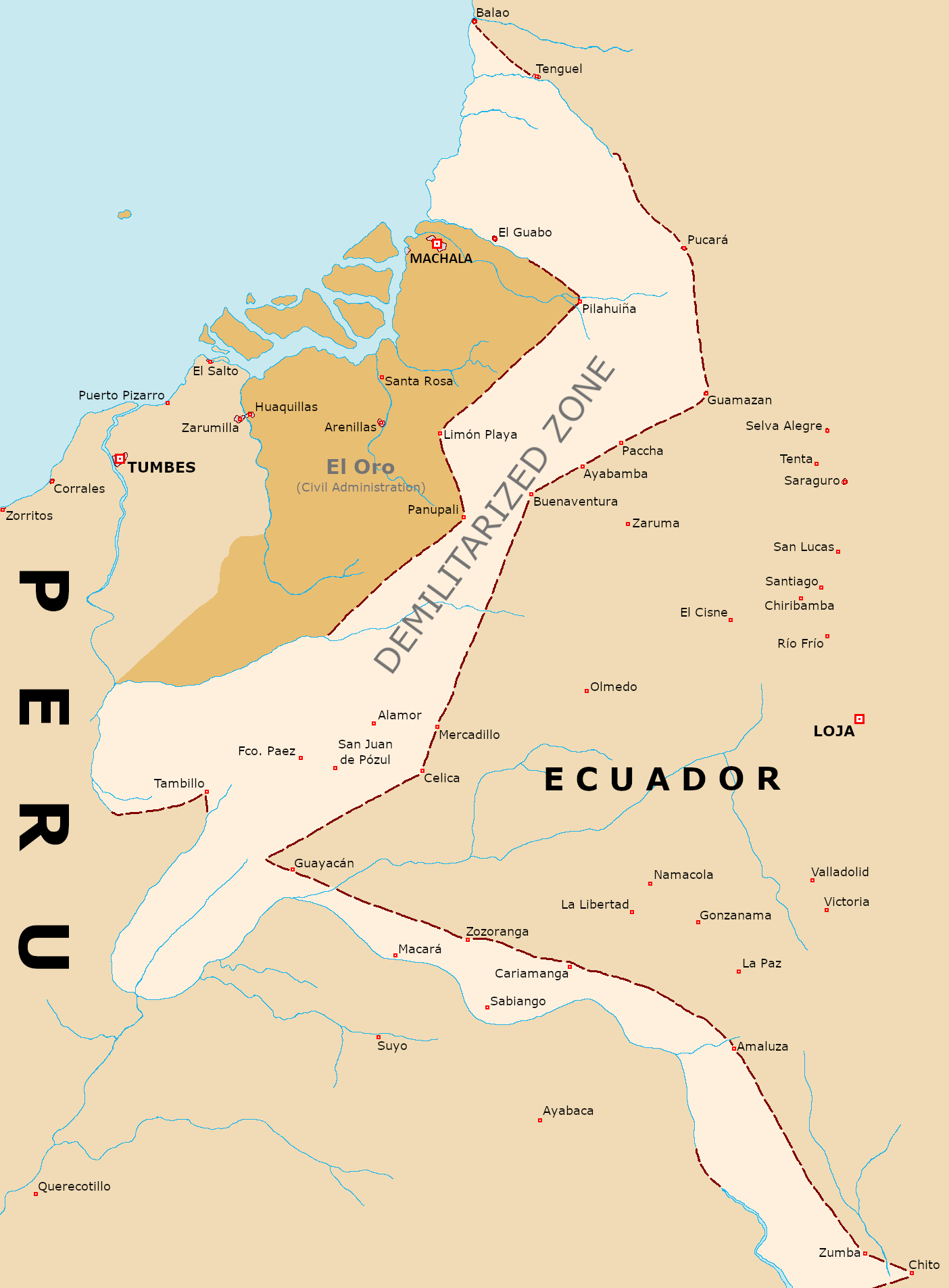
The Ecuadorian DMZ that lasted until February 1942

Arroyo del Río's undoing was the disastrous 1941 Ecuadorian–Peruvian War. Although the prior sequence of events—the breakdown of talks aimed at resolving the boundary issues in 1938, followed by repeated border skirmishes—had given ample warning of a possible outbreak of large-scale hostilities, Ecuador was unprepared to meet the July 5 Peruvian invasion. Furthermore, the president's fear of being left unprotected from his opponents led him to keep the nation's best fighting forces in Quito while Peruvian troops continuously attacked the nation's southern and eastern provinces until a ceasefire went into effect on July 31.

Peru's occupation ended only after January 1942, when the two nations signed the Protocol of Peace, Friendship, and Boundaries while attending the Third Conference of Foreign Ministers of the American Republics in Rio de Janeiro. Under the terms of the Rio Protocol, the informal name of the agreement, Ecuador renounced its claim to some 200,000 square kilometers of territory. Shortly afterward, the Rio Protocol was ratified by a bare plurality of the Ecuadorian legislature.

The Ecuadorian government quickly regretted having become a party to the Rio Protocol. The protocol became the focus of a surge of Ecuadorian national pride and concomitant opposition to Arroyo in a new coalition—the Democratic Alliance. The coalition brought together a wide array of Ecuadorian politicians dedicated to replacing the "president who had been unable to defend the national honor." Arroyo's rejoinder that he would remain in office the full four years, "neither one day more nor one day less," and his being prominently hailed in Washington as "the Apostle of Pan-Americanism " only increased his political isolation. A persistent inflation that whittled away at the purchasing power of salaried workers was a further cause of popular resentment against Arroyo.

In May 1944, following an uprising in Guayaquil that pitted the military and civilian supporters of Velasco against Arroyo's police, the president finally resigned. The military handed power to the Democratic Alliance, which in turn named Velasco, whose electoral candidacy had recently been vetoed by Arroyo, as the popularly acclaimed president of the republic. The populist master returned triumphantly from exile in Colombia, greeted by throngs of enthusiasts during a three-day journey to Quito, to assume the presidency for the second time.
