= 1868 Ecuadorian presidential election =

- 1868
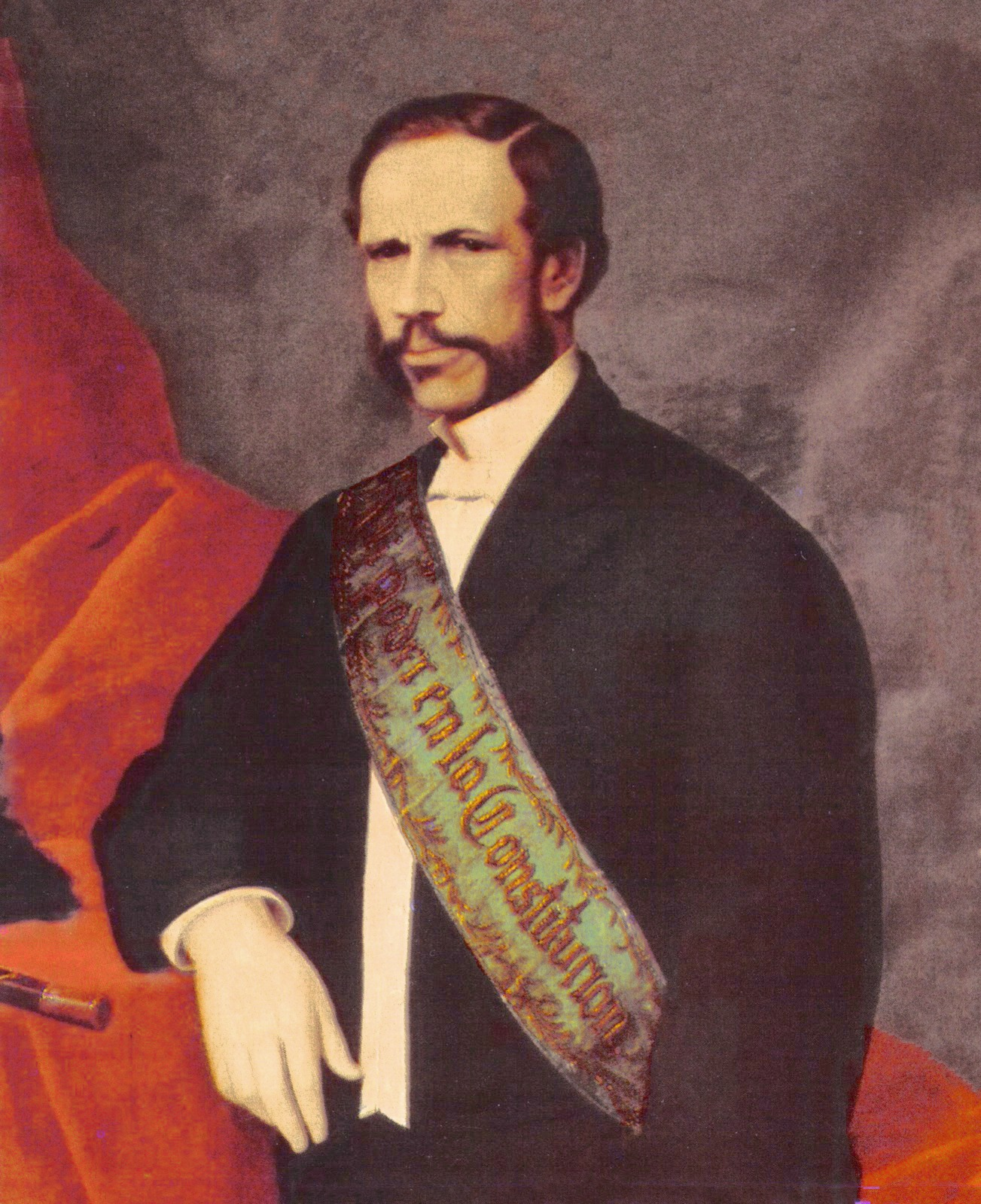
| Nominee | Juan Javier Espinosa |
President before election
Pedro José de Arteta
Elected President
Juan Javier Espinosa

Presidential elections were held in Ecuador in 1868, The result was a victory for Juan Javier Espinosa. He took office on 20 January.
