= 1933 Ecuadorian presidential election =

- 14–15 December 1933
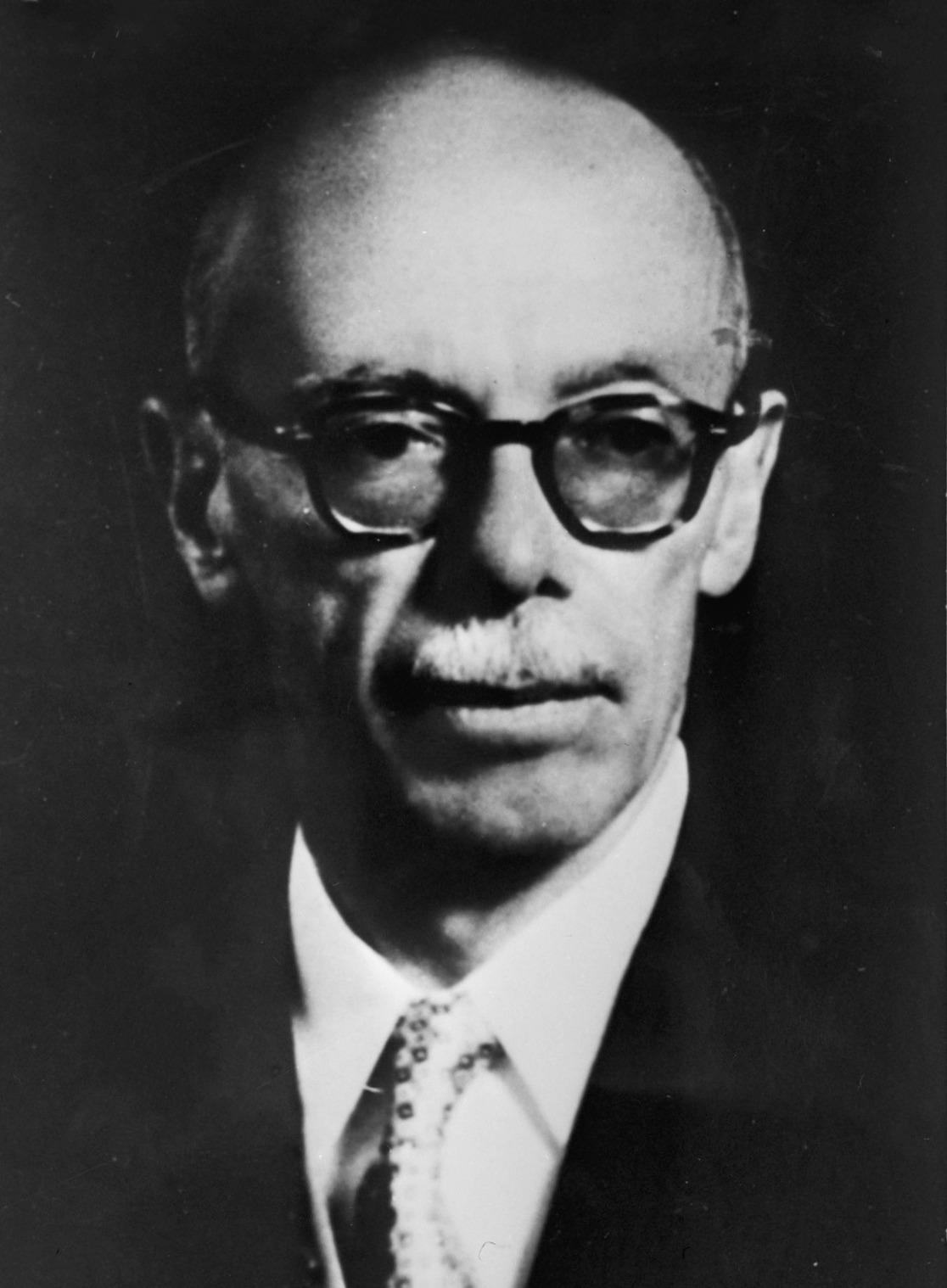
Nominee	José María Velasco Ibarra	Carlos Zambrano
Party	PC	Socialist
Popular vote	51,248	10,895
Percentage	80.16%	17.04%
President before election
Abelardo Montalvo
Elected President
José María Velasco Ibarra

Presidential elections were held in Ecuador on 14 and 15 December 1933. The result was a victory for José María Velasco Ibarra of the Conservative Party, who received 80% of the vote.

The Liberal Party did not put up a candidate for the election.

== Results ==
Candidate	Party	Votes	%
José María Velasco Ibarra	Conservative Party	51,248	80.16
Carlos Zambrano	Socialist Party	10,895	17.04
Colón Alfaro	Liberal Sector	943	1.48
Ricardo Paredes Romero	Communist Party of Ecuador	696	1.09
Other candidates		147	0.23
Total		63,929	100.00
Source: Nohlen, TSE
