= Benigno Andrade Flores =

Ecuadorian junta leader (1892–1972)

Benigno Andrade Flores (9 January 1892 – 22 June 1972) was chairman of military junta of Ecuador in September 1935.

Preceded by Antonio Pons	Head of State of Ecuador; 1935	Succeeded by Federico Páez
