= Jerónimo Carrión =

President of Ecuador (1865–1867)

Jerónimo Carrión y Palacio
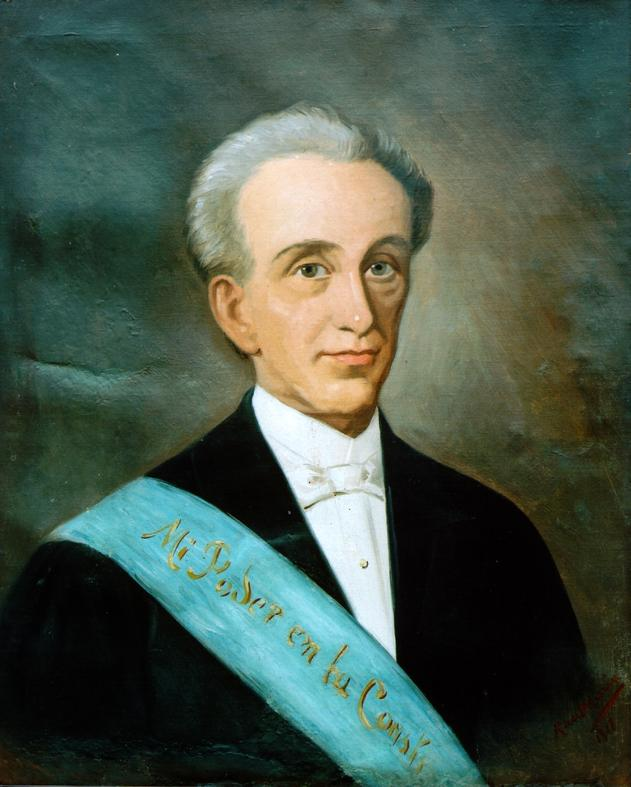

8th President of Ecuador
- In office 7 September 1865 – 6 November 1867
- Vice President: Pedro José de Arteta
- Preceded by: Rafael Carvajal
- Succeeded by: Pedro José de Arteta

Vice President of Ecuador
- In office 1858–1860
- President: Francisco Robles
- Preceded by: Marcos Espinel
- Succeeded by: Mariano Cueva

Personal details
- Born: 6 July 1804 Cariamanga, Quito, Viceroyalty of New Granada, Spanish Empire
- Died: 27 May 1873 (aged 68) Quito, Ecuador
- Party: Ecuadorian Conservative Party

Jerónimo Carrión y Palacio (6 July 1804, Cariamanga – 5 May 1873) was President of Ecuador between 7 September 1865 and 6 November 1867. He also served as Vice President of Ecuador from 1858 to 1860. He was a member of the Ecuadorian Conservative Party.

== Biography ==
His presidency demonstrated remarkable honesty in its procedures and loyalty to the principles of the government. But he showed a lack of energy, which was abused by the adversaries of the current regime and those who still did not forgive the vigilance and severity of the previous one. The failure of this government in which any other era would have been a constructive government and of historical significance gave beginning in the contrast of characters between García Moreno and Jerónimo Carrión. The Minister of Government, assumed all the functions of the regime, to the extent that the whole country noticed the lack of will of the President, although it was not quite so. However, the administration was wise and developed in a climate of peace and relative tolerance.

Political offices
Preceded by Marcos Espinel	Vice President of Ecuador; 1858–1860	Succeeded by Mariano Cueva
Preceded by Rafael Carvajal	President of Ecuador; 1865–1867	Succeeded by Pedro José de Arteta
