= Peruvian occupation of Ecuador =

Military occupation of Ecuador (1941–1942)

Occupation of Ecuador Ocupación del Ecuador (Spanish)
- 1941–1942
- Flags of Ecuador (DMZ) and Peru (El Oro) Coat of arms

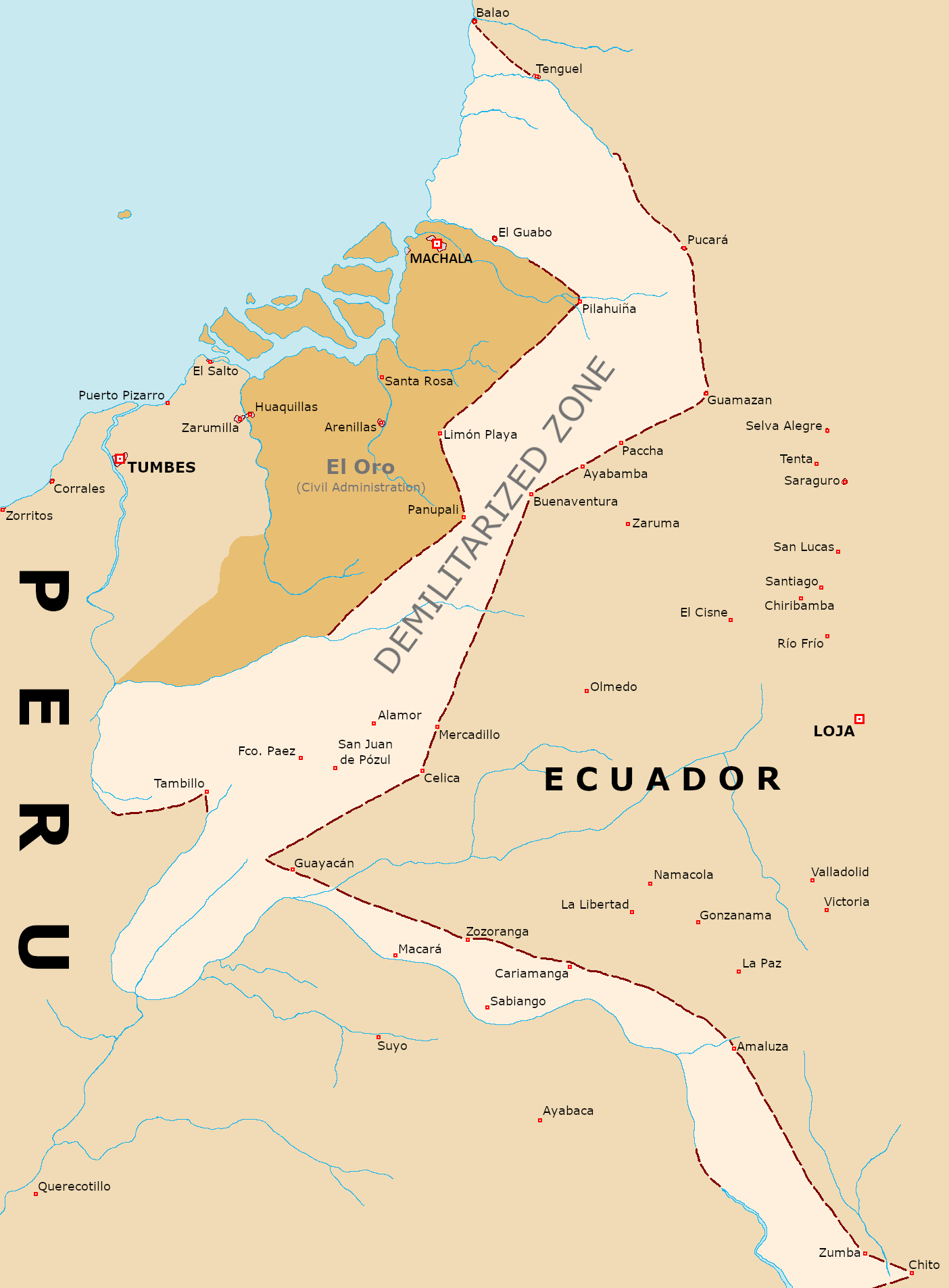
- Civil Administration in El Oro; Demilitarized Zone
- Capital: Machala
- Administration: Peru (El Oro); Ecuador (DMZ)
- Government: Civil administration under military occupation
- Historical era: Ecuadorian–Peruvian War
  - Beginning: 23 July 1941
  - Ceasefire: 31 July 1941
  - Withdrawal: 12 February 1942
Preceded by	Succeeded by
Ecuador	Ecuador; Peru

The Peruvian occupation of Ecuador was the military occupation by the Peruvian Army of the southern provinces of Ecuador that lasted from 1941 to 1942, during the Ecuadorian–Peruvian War. After a ceasefire was declared on July 31, 1941, the civil administration became limited to the provinces of El Oro and Loja until the Rio Protocol was signed on January 29, 1942, with Peruvian troops withdrawing on February 12.

== Background ==
In 1941, skirmishes between Ecuador and Peru along their unresolved border, and nationalistic public sentiment against each country by the other country's citizens, slowly escalated the territorial dispute that had existed for a century at that point.

Conflict broke out on July 5, when shots were fired between both parties alongside the Zarumilla River, leading to the Peruvian Northern Army Detachment's land and air campaign in southern Ecuador and thus beginning the main stage of the Ecuadorian–Peruvian War.

Faced with the threat to the Ecuadorian state, with Ecuadorian President Carlos Alberto Arroyo del Río keeping a sizable part of the Army in Quito, Ecuador promptly requested a ceasefire, which went into effect on 31 July 1941.

== Occupation ==
After the ceasefire, a civilian administration was established in the occupied Province of El Oro by Peru. A month later, on October 2, the Talara Accord (Spanish: Acuerdo de Talara) was signed, through which a bilateral ceasefire was put into place. The treaty also established a demilitarized zone between both states, which would be under the Ecuadoran administration, and the observation of military representatives of the mediator countries that also signed the agreement: the United States, Brazil and Argentina. Other countries involved in the mediation included the Vatican, which had acted both directly between both countries and in conjunction with the other mediators, and to a lesser extent, Chile and Mexico. The topic of Pan-Americanism was brought up, with countries such as Ecuador proclaiming their allegiance to the movement, and other countries, such as France, criticizing it and arguing that it only served to increase American influence in the continent.

By the time the ceasefire had been accepted, the cities bombarded by Peru included Santa Rosa, Machala and Puerto Bolívar. Peruvian aircraft had reached Guayaquil in at least two different occasions, but the squadron sent to the city limited itself to dropping propaganda leaflets, which were republished by Peruvian newspapers La Industria and El Tiempo.

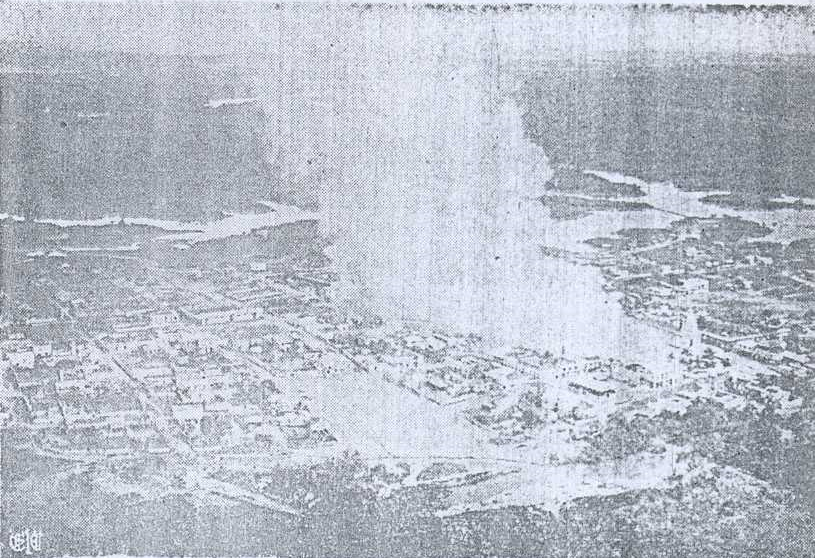
Santa Rosa during the fire

A fire began in Santa Rosa on 1 August 1941, which destroyed over 120 houses. Both sides blamed each other for the fire, with the Peruvian newspaper El Comercio blaming the retreating Ecuadorian troops with a report that claimed that locals had heard an Ecuadorian commander ordering that the area was burned to a crisp. The town was referred to as the "Lidice of America" by Italian writer Leonelly Castelly due to the scale of the destruction of the area being similar to that of the Czech town.

The Peruvian administration immediately started efforts in order to exploit the newly acquired territories in southern Ecuador. A civil administration was established in order to provide a sense of normalcy to the Ecuadorian citizens that lived under occupation, which relieved the military from certain efforts. A large effort from the Northern Army Detachment during this period also went into repairing and maintaining infrastructure, such as highways and railroads, which would in turn be used to the advantage of the Peruvian Army. This effort was so intense that less than half a year later, the province had been transformed from its war-torn state.

The Ecuadorian government also launched a diplomatic campaign, through which the Peruvian state was characterized as an expansionist state, attacking its neighbors by force and expanding its territories, also intending to strengthen its ties to Spain, which had remained neutral during the conflict. Peru, on the other hand, disputed the expansionist claims, claiming that the country had no intention of acquiring new territory, intending the occupation to be temporary since the beginning. During the conflict, Japan was accused of supplying Peru with weapons on more than one occasion, which increased the anti-japanese sentiment in the country to the point where Japanese organizations complained to the Ecuadorian government, which released an official communiqué denouncing the accusation.

The Cantonal Council of Machala, through which the city and El Oro province were administered, moved from Machala to Guayaquil, along with several refugees from El Oro in general. Some refugees travelled north as far as Cuenca or Quito in lesser numbers. The number of refugees was reportedly so large that citizens were urged to take them in their homes, with their goods looted by Peruvian troops, and reportedly sent via plane, train or car to Tumbes. The nearby town of Tendales was one of the points where refugees travelled, either to settle in there or to leave for Guayaquil or further north. As time went on, the numbers of refugees overwhelmed the town, which was unable to provide for such a large number of people.

With a large number of people leaving, the city of Machala, which would serve as the headquarters for the Peruvian administration, was reportedly left virtually empty, as the majority of its inhabitants had left for the north. Also prior to the evacuation, a general state of disorder had taken over due to a lack of administration, with both countries reporting looting by some Ecuadorian troops fleeing north.

=== Resistance ===
Despite the ceasefire, the demilitarized zone and the rather autonomous administration of the occupied territory, a resistance had been established by both Ecuadorian citizens and army members, through which acts of sabotage were carried out against the Peruvian occupying force. These acts ranged from lesser acts to armed confrontations between both parties that resulted in deaths on several occasions. These encounters were reportedly started by both sides up until the signing of the agreement that established the demilitarized zone on October 2.

==== Battle of Zapotillo ====
Battle of Zapotillo
Date	10–11 August 1941
Location	Zapotillo, Ecuador
Result	Peruvian victory

Belligerents
Peru	Ecuador

Commanders and leaders
Pastor Bendezú; José Corso Sotil; Percy Clark	Celso Vizuete; Adalberto Gallegos

Units involved
8th Artillery Group; 1st Resistance Center	España Battalion

On August 10, a similar event to the ones in southwestern Ecuador took place at the nearby border town of Zapotillo, where Peruvian troops attacked the town from their side of the Chirá river.

According to Peruvian accounts, the Ecuadorians had attempted to cross the Chirá river into Peruvian territory in order to carry out an offensive against local troops commanded by Commander Carlos Herrera Lynch in nearby Pampa Larga, and were held back from this advance in the aforementioned battle.

According to Ecuadorian accounts, survivors of the battle claimed that the Peruvian attack was sudden and overwhelming, as the Ecuadorians had limited manpower and resources, compared to the Peruvian Army's manpower, horsepower, artillery and air support, all of which reportedly saw action during the battle.

As a result of the artillery fired by the Peruvian Army during the battle, the town was destroyed by the time the fight was over. Like with Macará, the town of Zapotillo was occupied and vacated days later, since their orders were to safeguard the areas of Pampa Larga and Remolino.

==== Porotillo Incident ====
Battle of Porotillo
Date	11 September 1941
Location	Porotillo
Result	Ecuadorian victory

Belligerents
Peru	Ecuador

Commanders and leaders
Alfredo Novoa †	Jorge Maldonado

Units involved
5th Cavalry Regiment "Lanceros de Torata"	Yaguachi Cavalry Group; Jaramijó Battalion; Montúfar Battalion

Strength
23 army members 3 Civil Guard members	50–100 soldiers

Casualties and losses
23 killed 1 captured	90 killed & wounded

On September 11, what became known as the Porotillo Ambush by Peru or the Battle of Cune/Porotillo by Ecuador, took place in the eponymous town located 4 km from the Uscurumi bridge in El Oro, when Ecuadorian troops ambushed a Peruvian reconnaissance mission headed by Peruvian captain Alfredo Novoa. Novoa was the highest-ranking member of the Peruvian Army to be killed during the war.

Novoa had been ordered to head the mission, which would travel on the Peruvian occupation's side of the Jubones River, with a detachment under his command. The 2nd section of the 2nd squadron of the Peruvian 5th Cavalry Regiment was chosen for the task. The mission was ambushed by Ecuadorian troops, with only two sergeants from the 5th Cavalry Regiment surviving, and a Civil Guard member being taken prisoner. The attack lasted 15 minutes, and the Peruvian mission was annihilated. Novoa was mortally wounded, but managed to write down the events that took place. Also killed was Civil Guard captain Alipio Ponce. Both Novoa and Ponce were later declared national heroes of Peru.

The Peruvian Army thought that the attack that had taken place had been carried out by a larger army that had reached the region, which now controlled the area where the ambush had taken place.

As a reprisal against the attack, the Peruvian Air Force bombarded the Ecuadorian outposts on the banks of the river and the Palao–Tenguel region, with preparations being made for the occupation of the area. Diplomatic measures, however, prevented the offensive from taking place.

Peru later justified its actions in the Battle of Rocafuerte by citing this event and the one in Panupali one week later.

==== Panupali Incident ====
Battle of Panupali
Date	18–19 September 1941
Location	Panupali
Result	Indecisive

Belligerents
Peru	Ecuador

Commanders and leaders
Máximo Pimentel Obregón	Moisés Oliva Ojeda †

Units involved
5th Cavalry Regiment "Lanceros de Torata"	4th Cavalry Group "Febres Cordero"

Strength
36 men	40 men

Casualties and losses
9 killed & wounded	3 killed

On September 18, what became known as the Panupali Ambush by Peru or the Battle of Panupali by Ecuador, took place in the eponymous town, also in El Oro. The attack was similar in nature to the one that occurred one week prior, where Ecuadorian troops attacked Peruvian troops patrolling the area.

The Peruvian mission was surrounded by Ecuadorian troops, divided in three groups, who opened fire on them. The Peruvians managed to hold off the Ecuadorian attack for hours, unlike their counterparts in Porotillo, despite having inferior numbers compared to their Ecuadorian counterparts. 6 hours after the ambush began, reinforcements arrived to the scene. As a result, the Ecuadorians fled the scene.

As had happened one week prior, the Peruvian Air Force bombarded the area of El Placer, where the Ecuadorian troops were headquartered, in reprisal for the ambush. One Ecuadorian Army member got lost after the attack in the nearby jungle and reappeared two days later.

This event was the final one of its type before the signing of the Talara Agreement on October 2.

== End of the occupation ==
The Talara Agreement was signed on October 2, through which a bilateral ceasefire was agreed upon and enforced by both Ecuador and Peru. The treaty also established a demilitarized zone between both states, which would be under the observation of military representatives of the mediator countries that also signed the agreement, and would later sign the Rio Protocol in 1942: the United States, Brazil and Argentina.

The government of Ecuador, then led by Dr. Carlos Alberto Arroyo del Río, signed the Rio de Janeiro Protocol on January 29, 1942, with which Ecuador officially renounced its claim to a sovereign outlet to the Amazon River, finally establishing most of its border with Peru. As per the agreement, on February 12, 1942, Peruvian troops vacated the Ecuadorian province of El Oro. During this time, the orense government-in-exile had made the prior preparations in order to reestablish its administration of the province as soon as possible, such as the immediate reestablishment of a police force in order to establish a security body in the area, as well as the return of the refugees that had abandoned the province for the north of the country. The exiled Cantonal Council held its first plenary Session on January 18, six days after the withdrawal of Peruvian troops from Ecuador.

== See also ==
- Ecuadorian–Peruvian War
- Bolivian occupation of Peru
- Chilean occupation of Peru
