= 1932 Ecuadorian presidential election =

- 30–31 October 1932
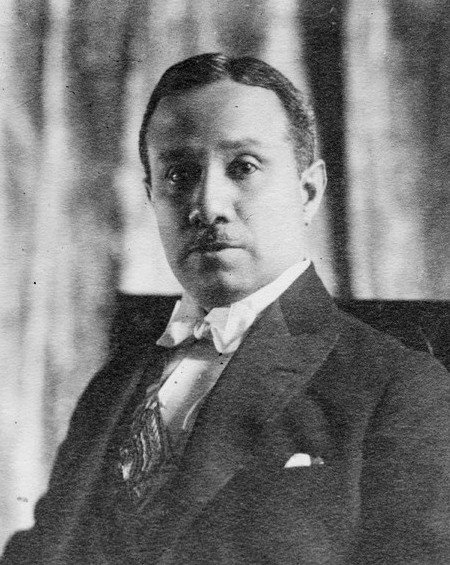

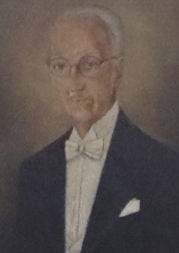

| Nominee | Juan de Dios Martínez | Manuel Sotomayor | Pablo Vela |
| Party | PLRE | PC | Independent |
| Popular vote | 56,872 | 16,212 | 6,093 |
| Percentage | 71.04% | 20.25% | 7.61% |
President before election
Alberto Guerrero Martínez
Elected President
Juan de Dios Martínez
PLRE

Presidential elections were held in Ecuador on 30 and 31 October 1932. The result was a victory for Juan de Dios Martínez, who received 71% of the vote.

Electoral fraud contributed to Juan de Dios Martínez's victory.

== Results ==
| Candidate | Party | Votes | % |
|---|---|---|---|
| Juan de Dios Martínez | Ecuadorian Radical Liberal Party | 56,872 | 71.04 |
| Manuel Sotomayor | Conservative Party | 16,212 | 20.25 |
| Pablo Vela | Independent (Socialist) | 6,093 | 7.61 |
| Other candidates | | 881 | 1.10 |
| Total | | 80,058 | 100.00 |
Source: Nohlen, TSE
