= Pedro José de Arteta =

Acting president of Ecuador (1867–1868)

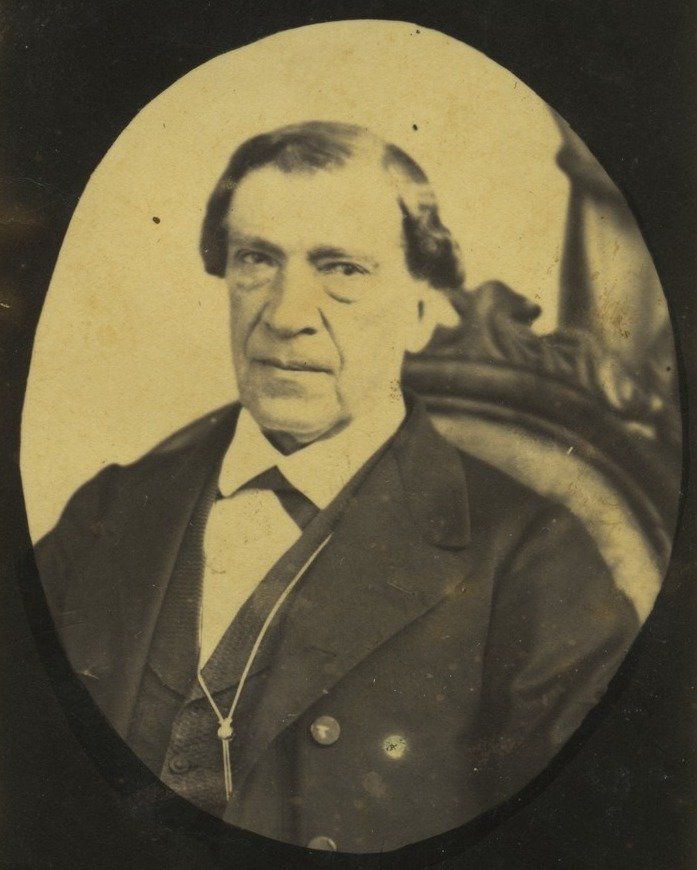

President of Ecuador
- Interim
- In office 7 November 1867 – 20 January 1868
- Preceded by: Jerónimo Carrión
- Succeeded by: Juan Javier Espinosa

Vice President of Ecuador
- In office 1868–1869
- President: Juan Javier Espinosa
- Preceded by: Position vacant
- Succeeded by: Francisco Javier León
- In office 1865–1867
- President: Jerónimo Carrión
- Preceded by: Rafael Carvajal
- Succeeded by: Position vacant

Personal details
- Born: Pedro José de Arteta y Calisto; 1797 Quito, Quito, Spanish Empire
- Died: 24 August 1873 (aged 75–76) Quito, Pichincha, Ecuador
- Party: Conservative Party

Pedro José de Arteta y Calisto (1797 in Quito – 24 August 1873) was Vice President of Ecuador from 1865 to 1869 and served briefly as interim President from 6 November 1867 to 20 January 1868. A member of the Conservative Party, he served as President of the Senate in 1839, and was also the brother of Nicolás Joaquín de Arteta y Calisto, first Archbishop of Quito.

== Early life ==
Pedro José de Arteta was born in Quito to Joaquín de Arteta de Larrabeytia, a native of Guayaquil, and Leonor Calisto Muñoz. The couple had sixteen children, including Nicolás de Arteta y Calisto, who would go on to be the future Archbishop of Quito.

== President of the Quito Municipal Council ==
During his term as president of the Quito Municipal Council, in 1825, he ordered the main streets to be paved and the facades of the houses to be uniformly painted with ochre-colored paint in preparation for Simón Bolívar's arrival; improvements to La Alameda Park continued, the bridges leading into the city were repaired, lanterns were purchased and installed to illuminate the city at night, and the process began to erect the commemorative pyramid on the site of the Battle of Pichincha.

== Vice presidency ==
Arteta, being the vice president of Jerónimand the process began to erect the commemorative pyramid on the site of the Battle of Pichincha.o Carrión, took charge of the executive branch on November 7, 1867 when the latter resigned. He remained in this position for 74 days, until Juan Javier Espinosa was elected to fill out the remainder of the term. He retained his post as vice president until 1869, when Espinosa was ousted by Gabriel García Moreno.

== See also ==
- List of presidents of the National Congress of Ecuador

Political offices
Preceded by Salvador Ortega Estacio	President of the National Court of Justice; 1849	Succeeded by Miguel Alvarado
Preceded by Miguel Alvarado	President of the National Court of Justice; 1851	Succeeded by Pablo Vásconez Román
Preceded by Ramón Miño Valdez	President of the National Court of Justice; 1861	Succeeded by Ramón Miño Valdez
Preceded by Carlos Tamayo	President of the National Court of Justice; 1865	Succeeded by Ramón Miño Valdez
Preceded by Rafael Carvajal	Vice President of Ecuador; 1865–1867	Succeeded by Vacant
Preceded by Jerónimo Carrión	President of Ecuador; 1867–1868	Succeeded by Juan Javier Espinosa
Preceded by Vacant	Vice President of Ecuador; 1868–1869	Succeeded by Francisco Javier León
