= Francisco Illingworth =

Vice President of Ecuador

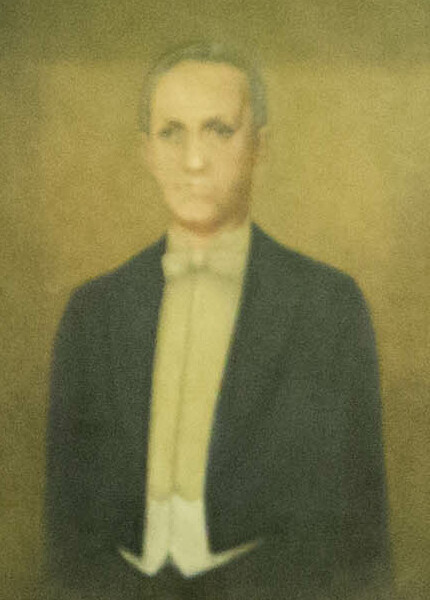
Francisco Illingworth

Francisco Illingworth Icaza (18 February 1905 – 20 June 1982) served as Vice President of Ecuador in the administration of Camilo Ponce Enríquez from 1956 to 1960. He was President of the Senate from 1956 to 1959. He was member of Partido Conservador (Conservative Party).

Political offices
Preceded by Alfredo Chiriboga	Vice President of Ecuador; 1956–1960	Succeeded by Carlos Julio Arosemena Monroy
