= 1952 Ecuadorian general election =

- 1 June 1952
- Presidential election
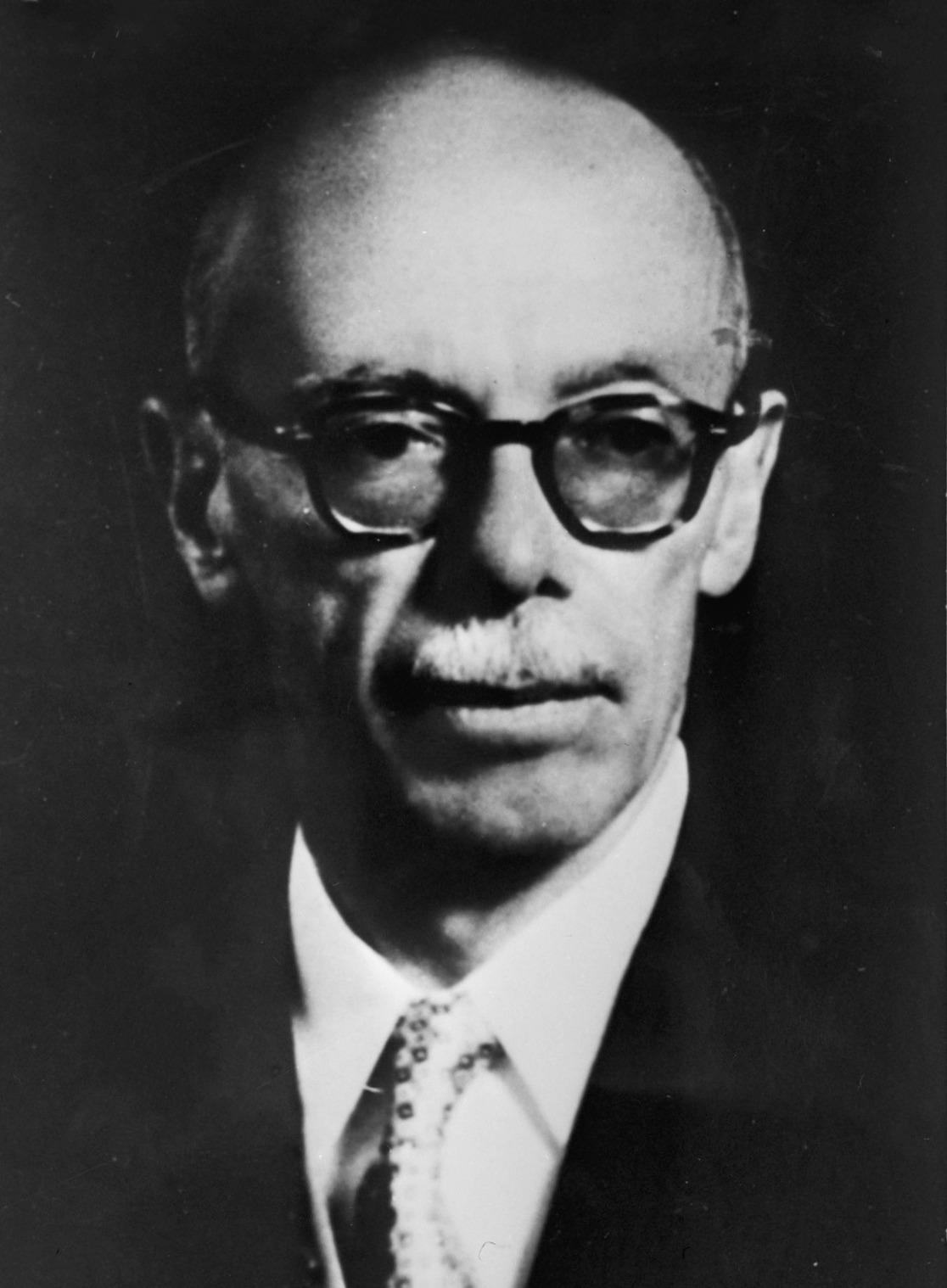

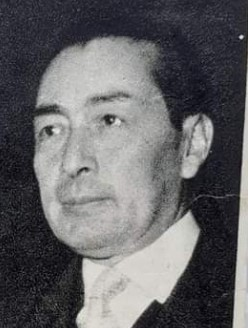

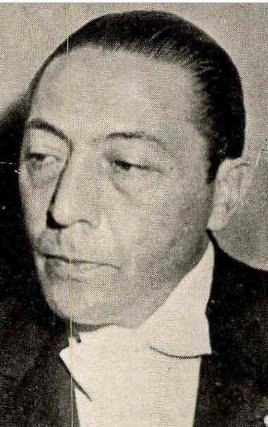

Nominee	José María Velasco Ibarra	Ruperto Alarcón Falconí
Party	FNV	PC
Running mate	Alfredo Chiriboga	Cristóbal Azúa Robles
Popular vote	152,259	116,870
Percentage	43.01%	33.01%
Nominee	José Ricardo Chiriboga	Modesto Larrea Jijón
Party	PLRE	ADN
Running mate	Manuel Alvarado Olea	Clodovedo Alcívar Zevallos
Popular vote	66,771	18,125
Percentage	18.86%	5.12%
- Results by province
President before election
Galo Plaza
Elected President
José María Velasco Ibarra
FNV

General elections were held in Ecuador on 1 June 1952. The presidential elections were won by José María Velasco Ibarra of the National Velasquista Federation–Ecuadorian Nationalist Revolutionary Action alliance. His term started on 1 September.

== Results ==
=== President ===
Candidate	Party	Votes	%
José María Velasco Ibarra	FNV–ARNE	152,259	43.01
Ruperto Alarcón Falconí	Conservative Party	116,870	33.01
José Ricardo Chiriboga	Ecuadorian Radical Liberal Party	66,771	18.86
Modesto Larrea Jijón	National Democratic Alliance	18,125	5.12
Total		354,025	100.00
Valid votes		354,025	98.99
Invalid/blank votes		3,629	1.01
Total votes		357,654	100.00
Registered voters/turnout		550,997	64.91
Source: Nohlen

=== House of Representatives ===
Party	Votes	%
Conservative Party	84,973	25.39
Ecuadorian Radical Liberal Party	47,143	14.08
National Democratic Alliance	11,334	3.39
Other parties	191,287	57.15
Total	334,737	100.00
