= Carlos Freile Larrea =

Ecuadorian politician

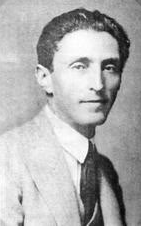

Head of the Executive Branch of Ecuador
- In office 27 August – 1 September 1932
- Preceded by: Alfredo Baquerizo
- Succeeded by: Alberto Guerrero

Personal details
- Born: Carlos Eduardo Freile Larrea; 1876
- Died: 23 April 1942 (aged 65–66)
- Cause of death: Stroke

Carlos Freile Larrea (1876 – 23 April 1942) was an Ecuadorian politician. He was in charge of the executive power of Ecuador from 27 August to 1 September 1932. He was Minister of Finance from 1939 to 1940.
