= Antonio Pons =

President in charge of the Republic of Ecuador (1935)

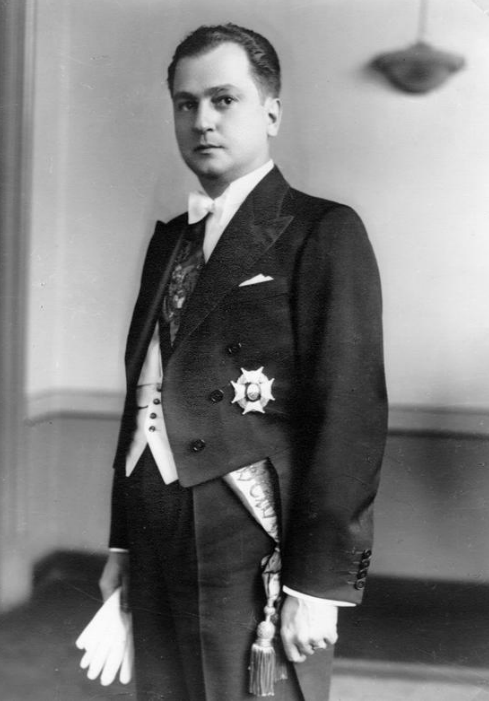

Head of the Executive Branch of Ecuador
- In office 20 August 1935 – 26 September 1935
- Preceded by: José María Velasco
- Succeeded by: Benigno Andrade

Personal details
- Born: 10 November 1897; Guayaquil, Ecuador
- Died: 12 January 1980 (aged 82)
- Cause of death: Pneumonia
- Political party: Conservative

Antonio Pons Campuzano (10 November 1897 – 12 January 1980) was in charge of the executive power of Ecuador from August to September 1935.

Political offices
Preceded by José María Velasco	President of Ecuador; 1935	Succeeded by Benigno Andrade
