= 1948 Ecuadorian presidential election =

- 6 June 1948
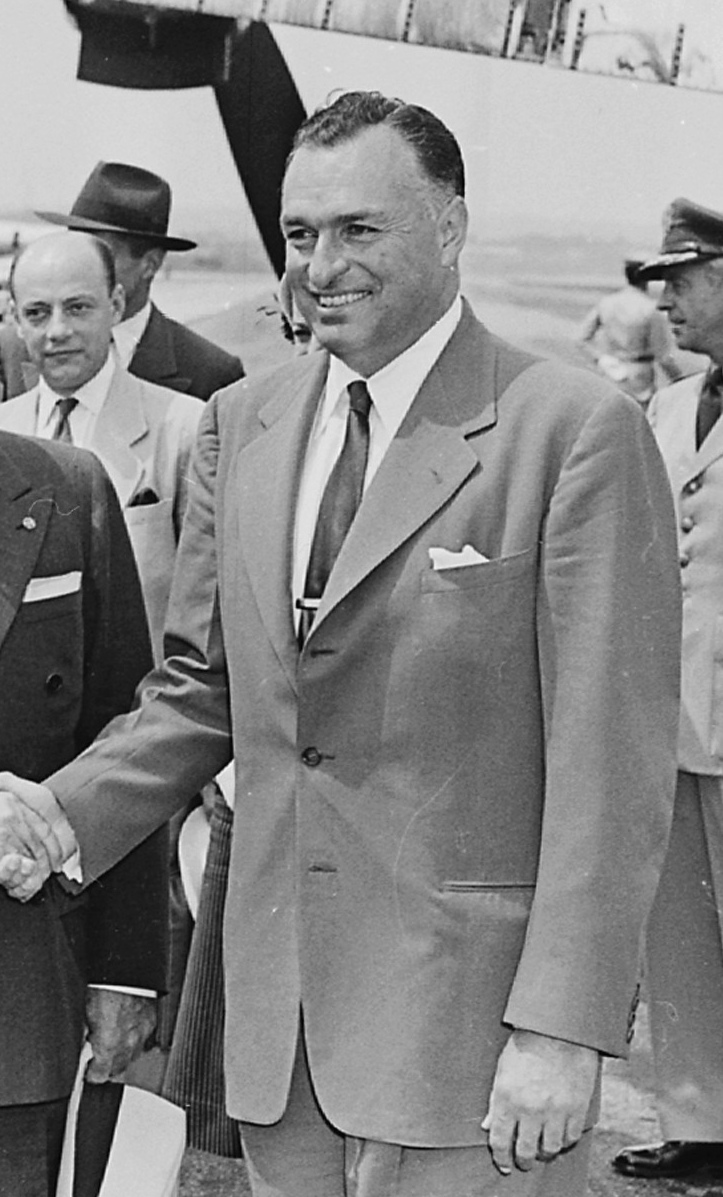

Nominee	Galo Plaza	Manuel Flor Torres	Alberto Enríquez Gallo
Party	MCDN	PC	PLRE–PSE
Running mate	Abel Gilbert	Manuel Sotomayor y Luna	Carlos Cueva Tamariz
Popular vote	115,708	112,356	53,649
Percentage	41.07%	39.88%	19.04%
- Results by province
President before election
Carlos Julio Arosemena Tola
Elected President
Galo Plaza

Presidential elections were held in Ecuador on 6 June 1948. The elections were supervised by the Supreme Electoral Tribunal for the first time. The result was a victory for Galo Plaza of the National Democratic Civic Movement, a moderate coalition that was able to draw supporters from both the Liberal Party and some traditional conservatives. He was inaugurated as president on 1 September 1948.

== Results ==
Candidate	Party	Votes	%
Galo Plaza	National Democratic Civic Movement	115,708	41.07
Manuel Flor Torres	Conservative Party	112,356	39.88
Alberto Enríquez Gallo	PLRE–PSE	53,649	19.04
Total		281,713	100.00
Registered voters/turnout		455,524	–
Source: Nohlen
