= Alberto Guerrero Martínez =

Acting President of Ecuador (1932)

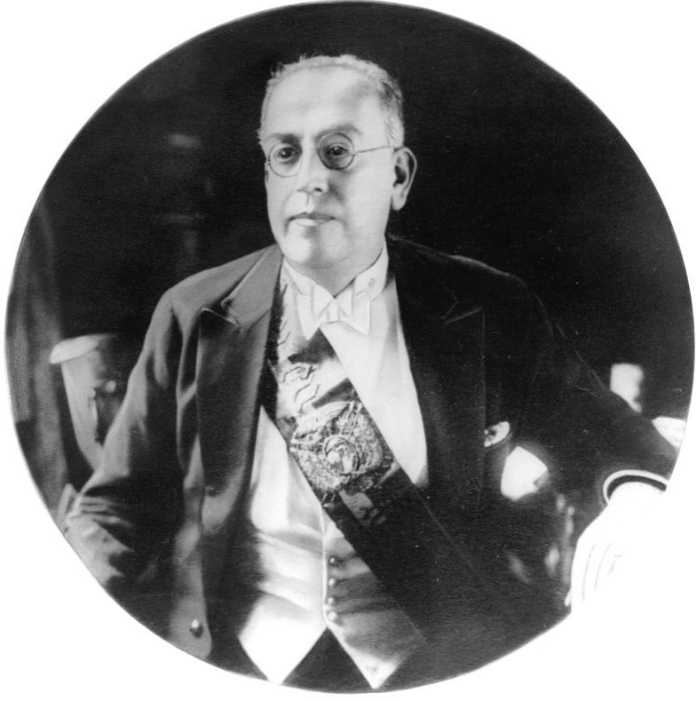

Acting President of Ecuador
- In office 2 September 1932 – 4 December 1932
- Preceded by: Carlos Freile Larrea
- Succeeded by: Juan de Dios Martínez

Personal details
- Born: 28 June 1884 Guayaquil, Ecuador
- Died: 21 May 1941 (aged 56) Guayaquil, Ecuador

Alberto Guerrero Martínez (28 June 1878 – 21 May 1941) was an Ecuadorian politician who served as President of Ecuador in 1932. Guerrero was elected to the Chamber of Deputies and then the Senate. He served as president of the Senate.

== Early life ==
Alberto Guerrero Martínez was born in Guayaquil on 28 June 1884 to Rafael Guerrero González and Emma Martínez Izquieta. He graduated with a Juris Doctor from the University of Guayaquil.

== Career ==
Guerrero was elected to the Chamber of Deputies from Los Ríos Province in 1914, and later served in the Senate. He served as president of the Senate. In 1930, he became president of the Guayaquil City Council.

== Presidency ==
Gonzalo Córdova became president of Ecuador in 1924, but suffered from poor health and his duties were delegates to Guerrero. A coup overthrew Córdova on 9 July 1925.

President Isidro Ayora was overthrown by Luis Larrea Alba, who was forced out of office after attempting to form a dictatorship. Alfredo Baquerizo was made acting president and to oversee new elections for the presidency. Neptalí Bonifaz won the 1931 presidential election, but was declared ineligible for the presidency by Congress on 20 August 1932 as he held Peruvian citizenship through his father and three of his four children were Peruvians; the constitution limited the presidency to native born Ecuadorians.

On 26 August, a decree was passed by Congress to allow Baquerizo to stay in office until new elections were held. Baquerizo served as president before resigning and being succeeded by Carlos Freile Larrea. Freile served as president of Ecuador for five days before being overthrown during the Ecuadorian Civil War of 1932. Guerrero replaced Freile as president and oversaw new elections that elected Juan de Dios Martínez to the presidency. Guerrero was president from 2 September to 4 December 1932.

== Death ==
Guerrero retired from politics after serving as president and died in Guayaquil on 21 May 1941.

== Works cited ==
=== Journals ===
- "South America". Current History. 25 (4). The New York Times: 475–509. 1927. doi:10.2307/45469629. JSTOR 45469629.
- Doyle, Henry (1932). "War and Revolt in South America". Current History. 37 (1). The New York Times: 89–94. doi:10.2307/45339994. JSTOR 45339994.
- Maier, Georg (1971). "Presidential Succession in Ecuador, 1830-1970". Journal of Interamerican Studies and World Affairs. 13 (3). Cambridge University Press: 475–509. doi:10.2307/174933. JSTOR 174933.

=== Web ===
- "Guerrero Martínez Dr. Alberto". Enciclopedia del Ecuador. Archived from the original on 11 March 2019.

Political offices
Preceded by Carlos Freile Larrea	President of Ecuador; 1932	Succeeded by Juan de Dios Martínez
