= Julio Teodoro Salem =

Ecuadorian politician

Acting President of Ecuador
- In office 29 May 1944 – 31 May 1944
- Preceded by: Carlos Alberto Arroyo
- Succeeded by: José María Velasco

Personal details
- Born: Julio Teodoro Salem Gallegos; September 26, 1900 Riobamba, Ecuador
- Died: 3 September 1968 (aged 67) Quito, Ecuador
- Party: Ecuadorian Radical Liberal Party

Julio Teodoro Salem Gallegos (26 September 1900 – 3 September 1968) was an Ecuadorian politician of Lebanese background. He was born in Riobamba. Salem was a member of Liberal Radical Party and was elected to the Congress is 1934. He also served as minister of public works. Salem was Head of State of Ecuador from 29 May 1944 to 31 May 1944 after Carlos Arroyo del Río was deposed.

Political offices
Preceded by Carlos Alberto Arroyo	Head of State of Ecuador; 1944	Succeeded by José María Velasco
