= 1956 Ecuadorian general election =

- 3 June 1956
- Presidential election
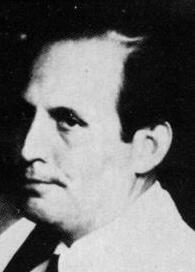

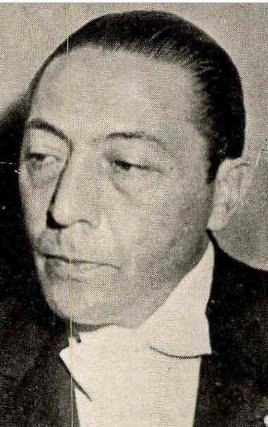
Nominee	Camilo Ponce Enríquez	Raúl Clemente Huerta
Party	PSC	PLRE
Alliance	AP	FDN
Running mate	Francisco Illingworth	José María Plaza
Popular vote	178,424	175,378
Percentage	29.04%	28.54%
Nominee	Carlos Guevara Moreno	José Ricardo Chiriboga Villagómez
Party	CFP	Dissidents
Running mate	Alfonso Zambrano Orejuela	Octavio Viteri Velásquez
Popular vote	149,935	110,686
Percentage	24.40%	18.01%
- Results by province
President before election
Jose Maria Velasco Ibarra
FNV
Elected President
Camilo Ponce Enríquez
PSC

General elections were held in Ecuador on 3 June 1956. The presidential elections were won by Camilo Ponce Enríquez of the People's Alliance, a coalition of the Conservative Party, the Social Christian Party and Ecuadorian Nationalist Revolutionary Action. He defeated Raúl Clemente Huerta of the National Democratic Front (an alliance of the Ecuadorian Radical Liberal Party, the Socialist Party and the Communist Party) by 0.5% of the vote. He took office on 1 September.

== Results ==
=== President ===
Candidate	Party	Votes	%
Camilo Ponce Enríquez	People's Alliance (PSC–Conservative Party–ARNE)	178,424	29.04
Raúl Clemente Huerta	National Democratic Front (PLRE–PSE–PCE)	175,378	28.54
Carlos Guevara Moreno	Concentration of People's Forces	149,935	24.40
José Ricardo Chiriboga Villagómez	Dissident liberal and Velasqist groups	110,686	18.01
Total		614,423	100.00
Registered voters/turnout		836,955	–
Source: Nohlen
