= 1931 Ecuadorian presidential election =

- 20–21 October 1931

Nominee	Neptalí Bonifaz	Modesto Larrea Jijón	Ildefonso Mendoza
Party	PC	PLRE	Socialist
Popular vote	27,042	19,442	12,565
Percentage	45.26%	32.54%	21.03%
President before election
Alfredo Baquerizo Moreno
PLRE
Elected President
Neptalí Bonifaz
PC

Presidential elections were held in Ecuador on 20 and 21 October 1931. The result was a victory for Neptalí Bonifaz, who received 45% of the vote. However, he was disqualified by Congress the following year as he had held Peruvian citizenship, and fresh elections were held in October 1932.

== Results ==
Candidate	Party	Votes	%
Neptalí Bonifaz	Conservative Party	27,042	45.26
Modesto Larrea Jijón	Ecuadorian Radical Liberal Party	19,442	32.54
Ildefonso Mendoza	Socialist Party	12,565	21.03
Other candidates		701	1.17
Total		59,750	100.00
Registered voters/turnout		155,186	–
Source: Nohlen, TSE
