= 1911 Ecuadorian presidential election =

- 1911
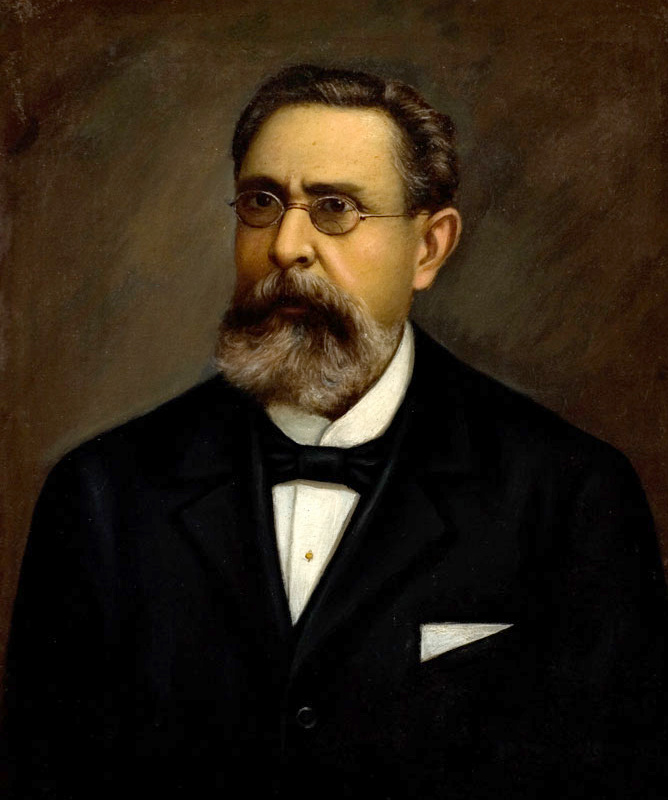

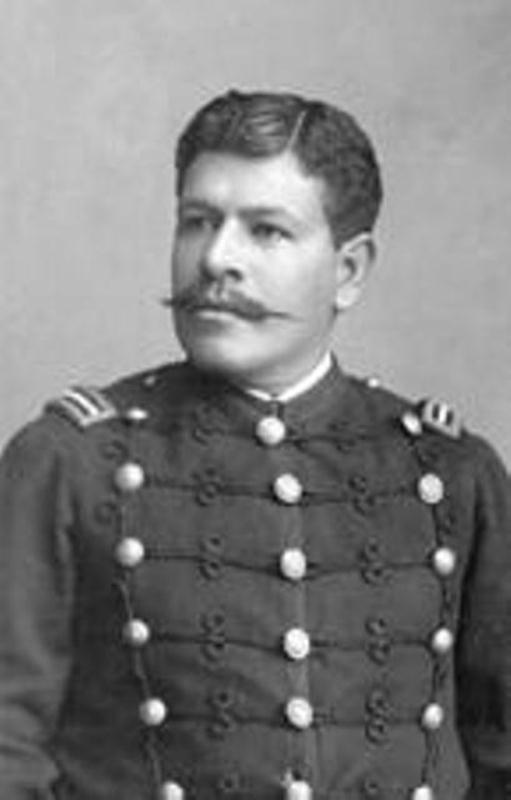
Nominee	Emilio Estrada Carmona	Flavio Alfaro
Party	Liberal	Liberal
Popular vote	103,024	3,708
Percentage	93.95%	3.38%
President before election
Carlos Freile Zaldumbide
Elected President
Emilio Estrada Carmona
Liberal

Presidential elections were held in Ecuador in 1911. The result was a victory for Emilio Estrada Carmona, who received 94% of the vote.

== Results ==
Candidate	Party	Votes	%
Emilio Estrada Carmona	Liberal Party	103,024	93.95
Flavio Alfaro	Liberal Party	3,708	3.38
Alfredo Baquerizo	Conservative Party	2,583	2.36
Other candidates		348	0.32
Total		109,663	100.00
Source: Nohlen, TSE
