= Bolivian occupation of Peru =

Military occupation of Peru (1835–1836)

- Part of the Salaverry-Santa Cruz War
| Date | 1835–1836 |
| Location | Southern Peru |
| Result | Bolivian victory: Confederation established in 1836; Salaverry executed in Arequipa; Capture of Lima; Occupation of 95% of Peru |

Belligerents
| Bolivia | Anti-Confederation troops: Salaverristas; Gamarristas; Supported by: Argentina; Chile |

Commanders and leaders
| Andrés Santa Cruz | Felipe Salaverry (executed); Agustín Gamarra |

Strength
| 6,500 men | 8,000 men |

The Bolivian occupation of Peru, known in Bolivia as the War of Pacification of Peru (Spanish: Pacificación del Perú), took place during the civil war between Andrés de Santa Cruz and Felipe Santiago Salaverry. The allied Bolivian–Peruvian Army led by Santa Cruz, with the support of militias from Iquicha led by Antonio Huachaca successfully fought the allied forces of Salaverry and Agustín Gamarra, achieving its goal of establishing a Confederate state consisting of a Peruvian and Bolivian state.

This intervention responded to requests from Peruvian President Luis José de Orbegoso to defeat the parallel government of Felipe Salaverry. The Bolivian president, Andrés de Santa Cruz, initially collaborated by providing weapons and ammunition to the troops loyal to Orbegoso. Later Santa Cruz, in command of the Bolivian Army, decided to carry out an armed intervention by entering Peruvian territory through the southern front. Upon entering Peru, Orbegoso designated Santa Cruz as Superior Chief of the United Army.

== See also ==
- Chilean occupation of Peru
- Peruvian occupation of Ecuador
- Peru–Bolivian Confederation

== Bibliography ==
- Basadre, Jorge (1998). Historia de la República del Perú. 1822 - 1933. Vol. 1 & 2 (8th ed.). Santiago de Chile: La República / Universidad "Ricardo Palma".
