= Manuel María Borrero =

Ecuadorian politician (1883–1975)

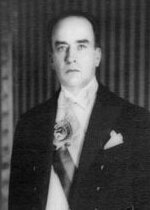

Interim President of Ecuador
- In office 10 August 1938 – 2 December 1938
- Preceded by: Alberto Enríquez Gallo
- Succeeded by: Aurelio Mosquera

Personal details
- Born: 10 May 1883 Cuenca, Ecuador
- Died: 7 June 1975 (aged 92) Quito, Ecuador
- Party: Radical Liberal

Manuel María Borrero González (10 May 1883 – 7 June 1975) was President of Ecuador in 1938.

Political offices
Preceded by Manuel Eduardo Escudero Viteri	President of the National Court of Justice; 1932	Succeeded by José Antonio Baquero de la Calle
Preceded by Alberto Enríquez Gallo	President of Ecuador; 1938	Succeeded by Aurelio Mosquera
