= Alfredo Novoa =

Peruvian war hero

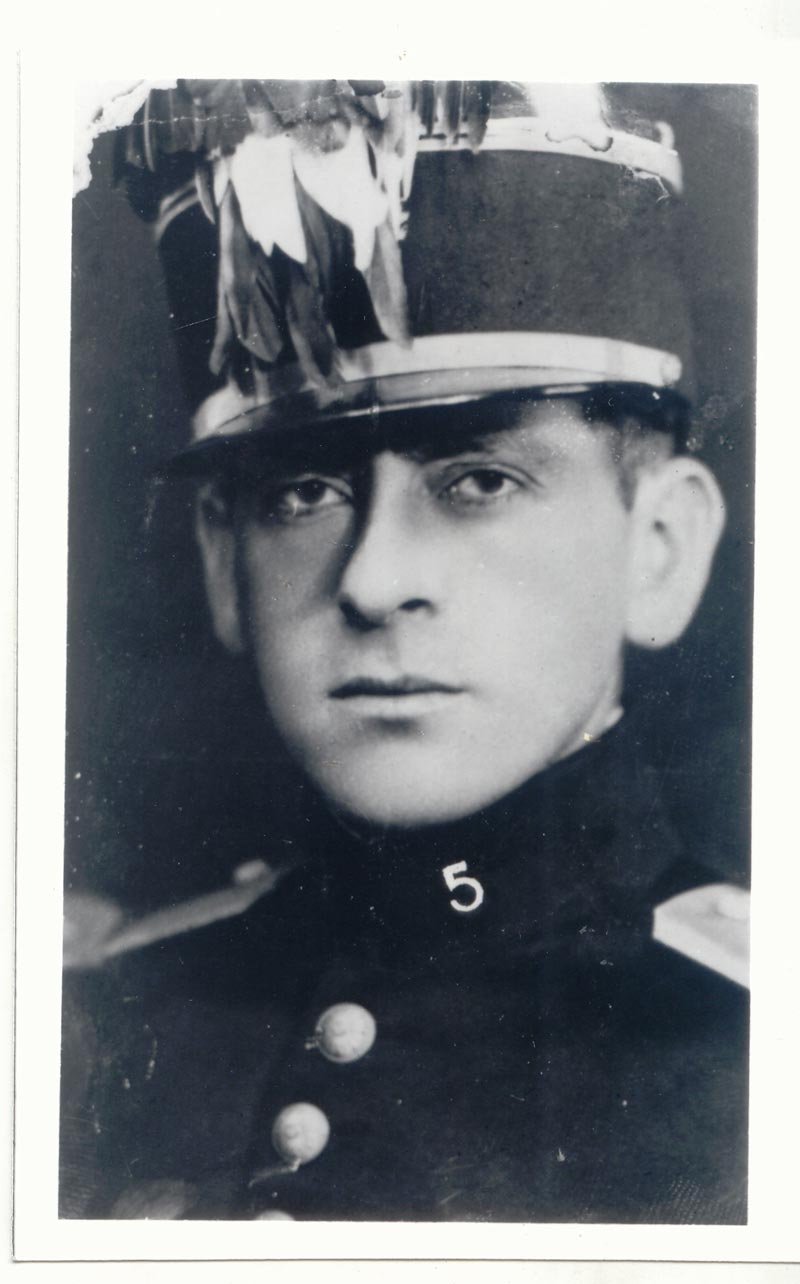
- Born: Alfredo Medardo Novoa Cava; November 26, 1908; Chepén, Peru
- Died: September 11, 1941 (aged 32) Porotillo, Ecuador
- Allegiance: Peru
- Branch: Peruvian Army
- Service years: 1932–1941
- Rank: Captain
- Conflicts: Ecuadorian–Peruvian War: Battle of Zarumilla; Porotillo Ambush †

Alfredo Medardo Novoa Cava (Chepén, November 26, 1908 — Porotillo, September 11, 1941) was a Peruvian captain who was killed in action during the 1941 Ecuadorian–Peruvian War.

== Biography ==
Novoa was born in Chepén in 1908, to parents Alberto Novoa Apaestegui and Elvira Cava Mestanza. His paternal grandfather, Justiniano Novoa, fought against the Chilean Army in Cajamarca during the War of the Pacific.

On September 11, 1941, in the aftermath of the Ecuadorian–Peruvian War, Novoa had been ordered to head a reconnaissance mission, which would travel on the Peruvian occupation's side of the Jubones River, with a detachment under his command. The 2nd section of the 2nd squadron of the Peruvian 5th Cavalry Regiment was chosen for the task. The mission was ambushed by Ecuadorian troops, with only two sergeants from the 5th Cavalry Regiment surviving, and a Civil Guard member being taken prisoner. The attack lasted 15 minutes, and the Peruvian mission was annihilated. Novoa was mortally wounded, but managed to write down the events that took place. Also killed was Civil Guard captain Alipio Ponce. Both Novoa and Ponce were later declared national heroes of Peru.

The Peruvian Army thought that the attack that had taken place had been carried out by a larger army that had reached the region, which now controlled the area where the ambush had taken place.

As a reprisal against the attack, the Peruvian Air Force bombarded the Ecuadorian outposts on the banks of the river and the Palao–Tenguel region, with preparations being made for the occupation of the area. Diplomatic measures, however, prevented the offensive from taking place.

Peru later justified its actions in the Battle of Rocafuerte by citing this event and the one in Panupali one week later.

== See also ==
- Alipio Ponce
- Mariano Santos Mateo
