= Rafael Carvajal =

Vice president of Ecuador

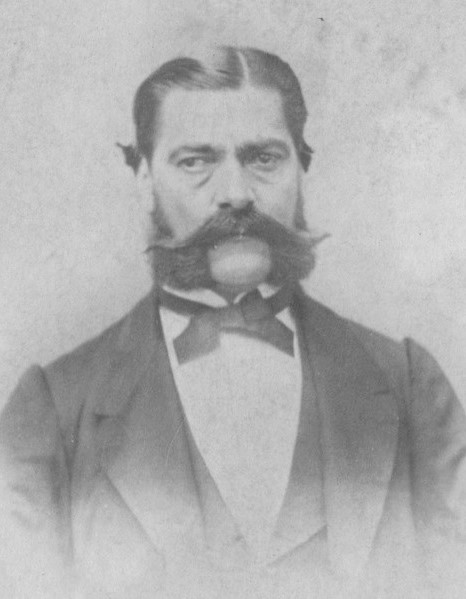

Acting President of Ecuador
- In office 31 August 1865 – 7 September 1865
- Preceded by: Gabriel García Moreno
- Succeeded by: Jerónimo Carrión

Vice President of Ecuador
- In office 1864–1865
- Preceded by: Antonio Borrero
- Succeeded by: Pedro José de Arteta

Personal details
- Born: 1818
- Died: 1881 (aged 62–63)
- Party: Conservative Party

Rafael Carvajal Guzmán (1818–1881) was the vice president of Ecuador from 1864 to 1865 and the acting president from 31 August 1865 to 7 September 1865.

He was Minister of Finance in 1862, and in 1869.

Political offices
Preceded by Antonio Borrero	Vice President of Ecuador; 1864–1865	Succeeded by Pedro José de Arteta
Preceded by Gabriel García Moreno	President of Ecuador; 1865	Succeeded by Jerónimo Carrión
Preceded by Nicolás Martínez Vásconez	President of the National Court of Justice; 1872	Succeeded by Luis A. Salazar Arboleda
