= Federico Páez =

Ecuadorian politician; President of Ecuador (1935-1937)

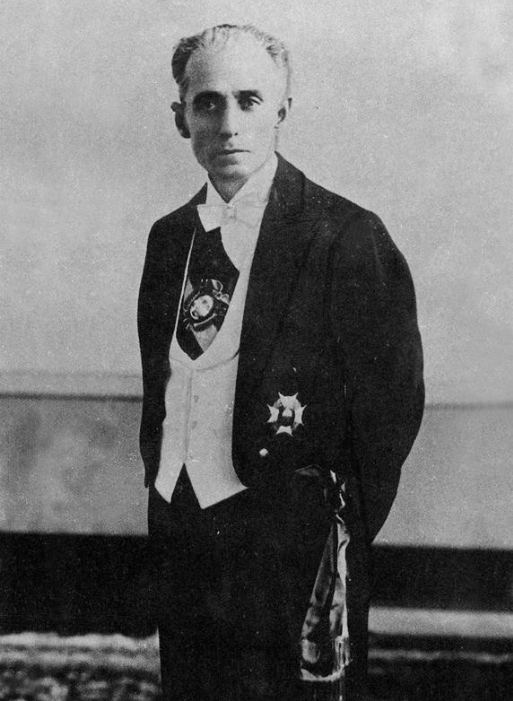

Supreme Chief of Ecuador
- In office 26 September 1935 – 23 October 1937
- Preceded by: Antonio Pons
- Succeeded by: Alberto Enríquez Gallo

Personal details
- Born: 6 June 1876 or 4 June 1877 Quito, Ecuador
- Died: 9 February 1974 (aged 96–97) Quito, Ecuador
- Party: Socialist

Federico Páez Chiriboga (6 June 1876 or 4 June 1877 – 9 February 1974) was the President of Ecuador from 1935 to 1937, and engineer. He was overthrown in a military coup.

== Early life ==
He was born on June 4, 1877, in Quito. His parents were Ángel Adolfo Páez and Rita Lemus Chávez. After his parents’ divorce, he changed his second surname to that of his maternal great-grandfather. Páez studied at the Lycée Hoche in Paris and pursued engineering at the Universities of Ghent and Brussels in Belgium. He married Adelaida Espinosa García, and they had a daughter named Rita Páez Espinosa.

== Career ==
His political career was marked by both progressive and authoritarian policies. Páez served as a senator and later as Minister of Public Works under José María Velasco Ibarra. He sympathized with socialism and was affiliated with the Ecuadorian Socialist Party. During his time in power, he implemented both socialist and liberal policies, drawing inspiration from fascist governments in Italy and Germany. His presidency included periods of repression and ideological shifts. His legacy remains complex, reflecting the challenges of balancing socialism and liberalism in Ecuadorian politics.

Political offices
Preceded by Benigno Andrade	President of Ecuador; 1935–1937	Succeeded by Alberto Enríquez
Records
Preceded by Dezső Pattantyús-Ábrahám	Oldest living state leader 25 July 1973 – 9 February 1974	Succeeded by Borys Martos
