= 1940 Ecuadorian presidential election =

Election in Ecuador

- 10–11 January 1940
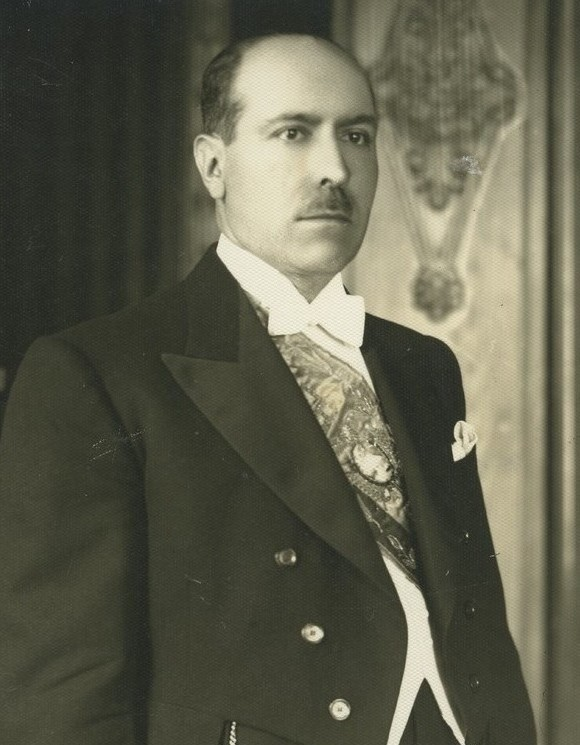

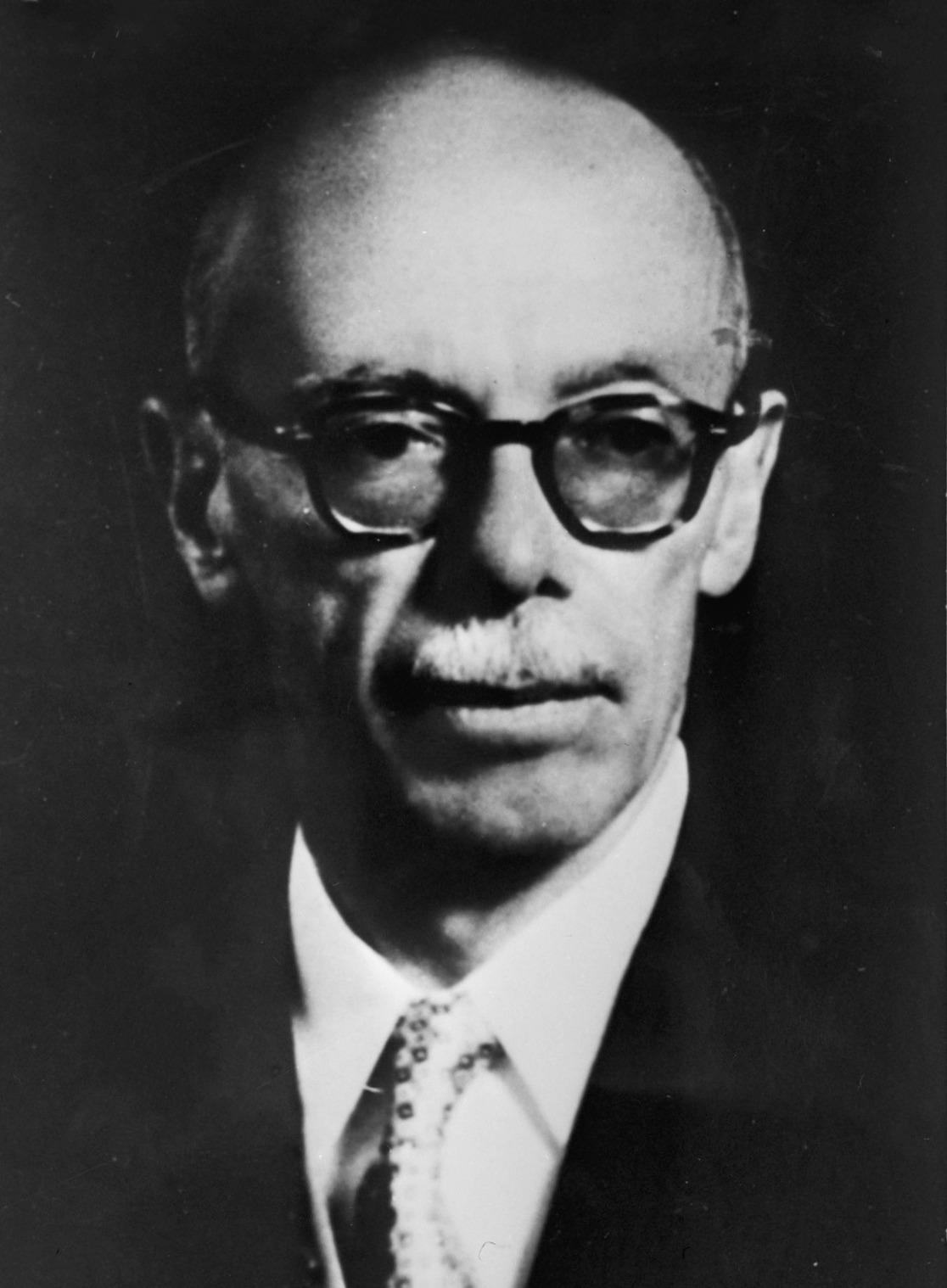

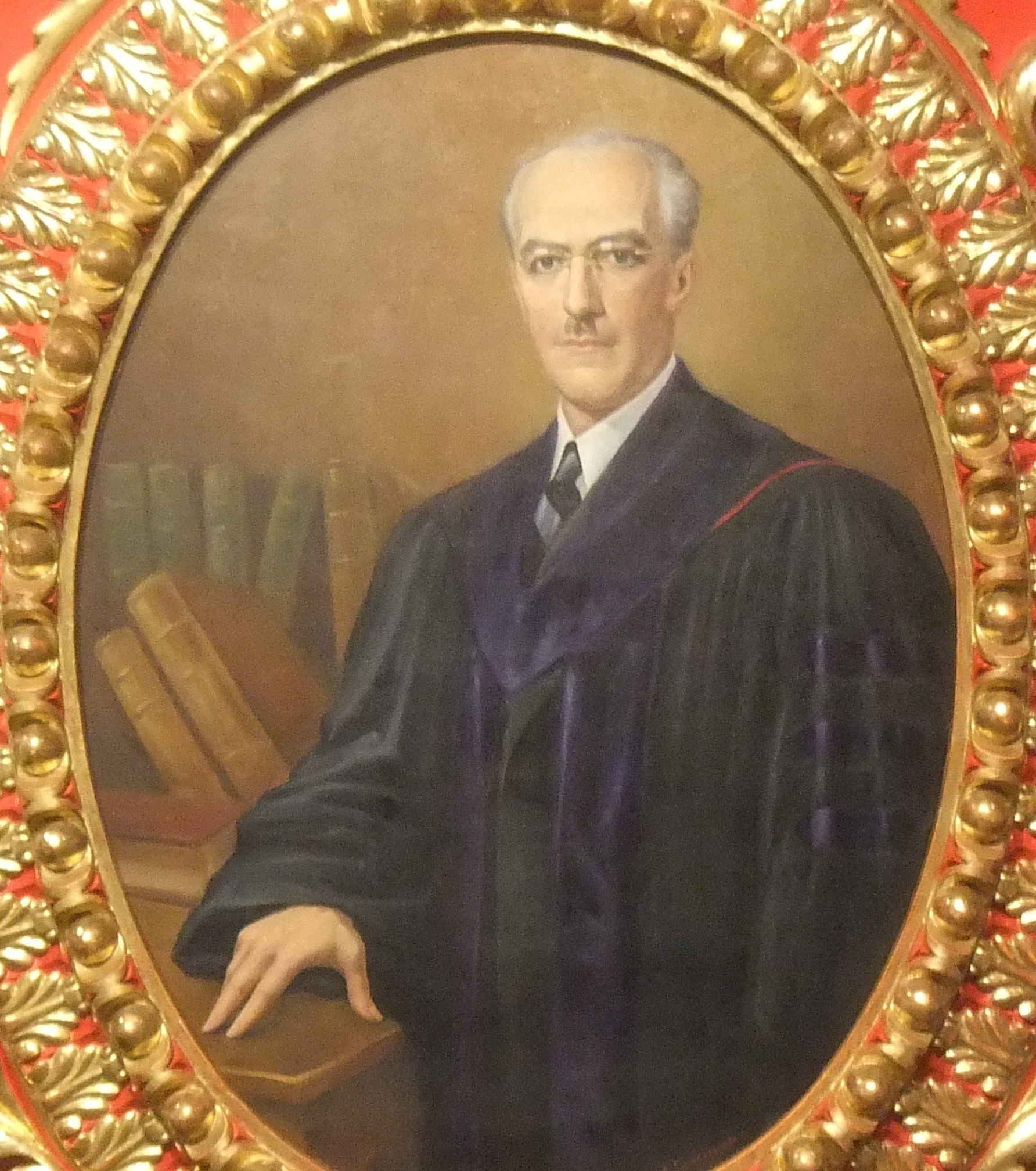
Nominee	Carlos Alberto Arroyo del Río	José María Velasco Ibarra	Jacinto Jijón y Caamaño
Party	PLRE	Independent	PC
Popular vote	43,642	22,061	16,376
Percentage	53.16%	26.87%	19.95%
President before election
Julio Enrique Moreno
Elected President
Carlos Alberto Arroyo del Río

Presidential elections were held in Ecuador on 10 and 11 January 1940. The result was a victory for Carlos Alberto Arroyo del Río of the Ecuadorian Radical Liberal Party, who received 53% of the vote.

Electoral fraud contributed to Carlos Alberto Arroyo del Río's victory.

== Results ==
Candidate	Party	Votes	%
Carlos Alberto Arroyo del Río	Ecuadorian Radical Liberal Party	43,642	53.16
José María Velasco Ibarra	Independent	22,061	26.87
Jacinto Jijón y Caamaño	Conservative Party	16,376	19.95
Other candidates		21	0.03
Total		82,100	100.00
Source: Nohlen
