= Jefe Supremo =

Jefe Supremo (Supreme Chief) was a form of address was used in several countries of Latin America during the republican period and until the 1950s.

It was used as a pseudonym of Chief of state during and after an armed or civilian conflict. The title was a candid admission that the holder had no legal claim to the office of the presidency.
