= Aurelio Mosquera =

President of Ecuador

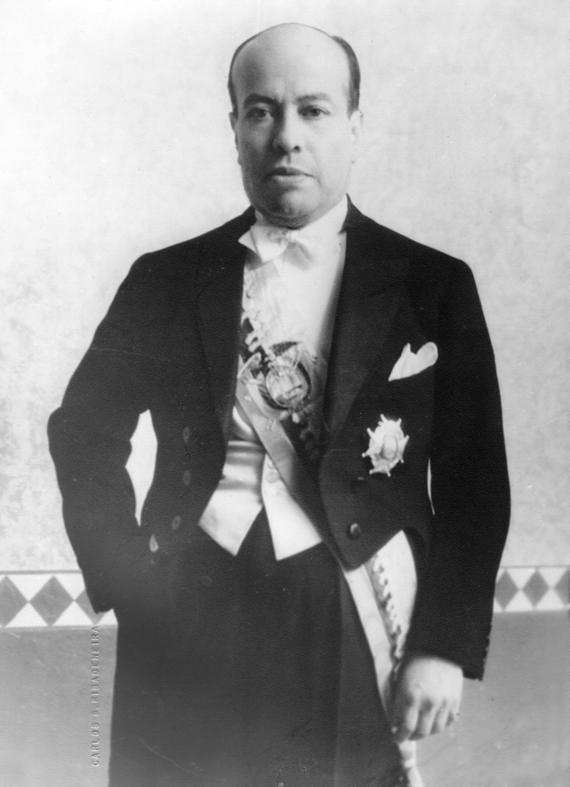

25th President of Ecuador
- In office 2 December 1938 – 17 November 1939
- Preceded by: Manuel María Borrero
- Succeeded by: Carlos Alberto Arroyo

Personal details
- Born: 2 August 1883 Quito, Ecuador
- Died: 17 November 1939 (aged 56) Quito, Ecuador
- Cause of death: Heart attack
- Party: Radical Liberal
- Spouse: Judith Pérez Dávalos

Don Aurelio Mosquera Narváez (2 August 1883 – 17 November 1939) was an Ecuadorian politician who served as President of Ecuador from December 1938 to November 1939.

Mosquera was born in Quito. He studied medicine in Quito, then traveled to Paris to continue his education. Upon his return, he achieved great success as a professor, dean, and rector of the Central University of Ecuador. He was elected head of the Ecuadorian Radical Liberal Party. He was also vice president of the Chamber of Deputies and of the Senate. In 1938, after the dismissal of Manuel María Borrero, he was named President of Ecuador. During his short time as president, with the support of the army, he dissolved the National Assembly and reestablished the Constitution of 1906, known for its secularity. His term as president ended when he died on 17 November 1939 in Quito.

Mosquera was supported by socialists and liberals. He closed the Central University and the Juan Montalvo school. He created organizations to support artisans and small business owners.

== Sources ==
- Fernández, Tomás and Tamaro, Elena: "Biografia de Aurelio Mosquera Narváez". In Biografías y Vidas. La enciclopedia biográfica en línea. Barcelona, España, 2004 (accessed 10 April 2024)
- George M. Lauderbaugh, 2019: Historical Dictionary of Ecuador, p. 299 (online version)
- Enciclopedia del Ecuador: Aurelio Mosquera Narváez
- Biblioteca Digital Universidad Central del Ecuador - Retrato del Rector Aurelio Mosquera Narváez (portrait of Aurelio Mosquera Narváez as Rector)
- Official Website of the Ecuadorian Government about the country President's History

Political offices
Preceded by Manuel María Borrero	President of Ecuador; 1938–1939	Succeeded by Carlos Alberto Arroyo
