= Camilo Ponce Enríquez (politician) =

President of Ecuador from 1956 to 1960

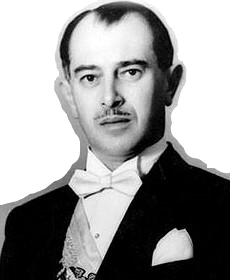

30th President of Ecuador
- In office 1 September 1956 – 31 August 1960
- Vice President: Francisco Illingworth
- Preceded by: José María Velasco Ibarra
- Succeeded by: José María Velasco Ibarra

Personal details
- Born: 31 January 1912 Quito, Ecuador
- Died: 13 September 1976 (aged 64) Quito, Ecuador
- Party: Social Christian
- Spouse: Dolores Gangotena (m. 1940)

Camilo Ponce Enríquez (31 January 1912 in Quito – 13 September 1976) was an Ecuadorian political figure. He served as the 30th President of Ecuador between 1956 and 1960. He was married to Dolores Marta Gracia de Gangotena y Jijón.

Ponce initially ran in the presidential election of 1948, but only came in third place. In 1951 Ponce, along with Sixto Durán Ballén, founded the Movimiento Social Cristiano (MSC), which later became the Partido Social Cristiano (PSC). In 1956 he won the presidential election and named Durán Ballén minister of public works. He ran a final time in the election of 1968, once again coming in third place.

== See also ==
- Camilo Ponce Enríquez Canton
- Camilo Ponce Enríquez (parish)

Political offices
Preceded by José María Velasco	President of Ecuador; 1956-1960	Succeeded by José María Velasco
