= Juan Javier Espinosa =

President of Ecuador (1868–1869)

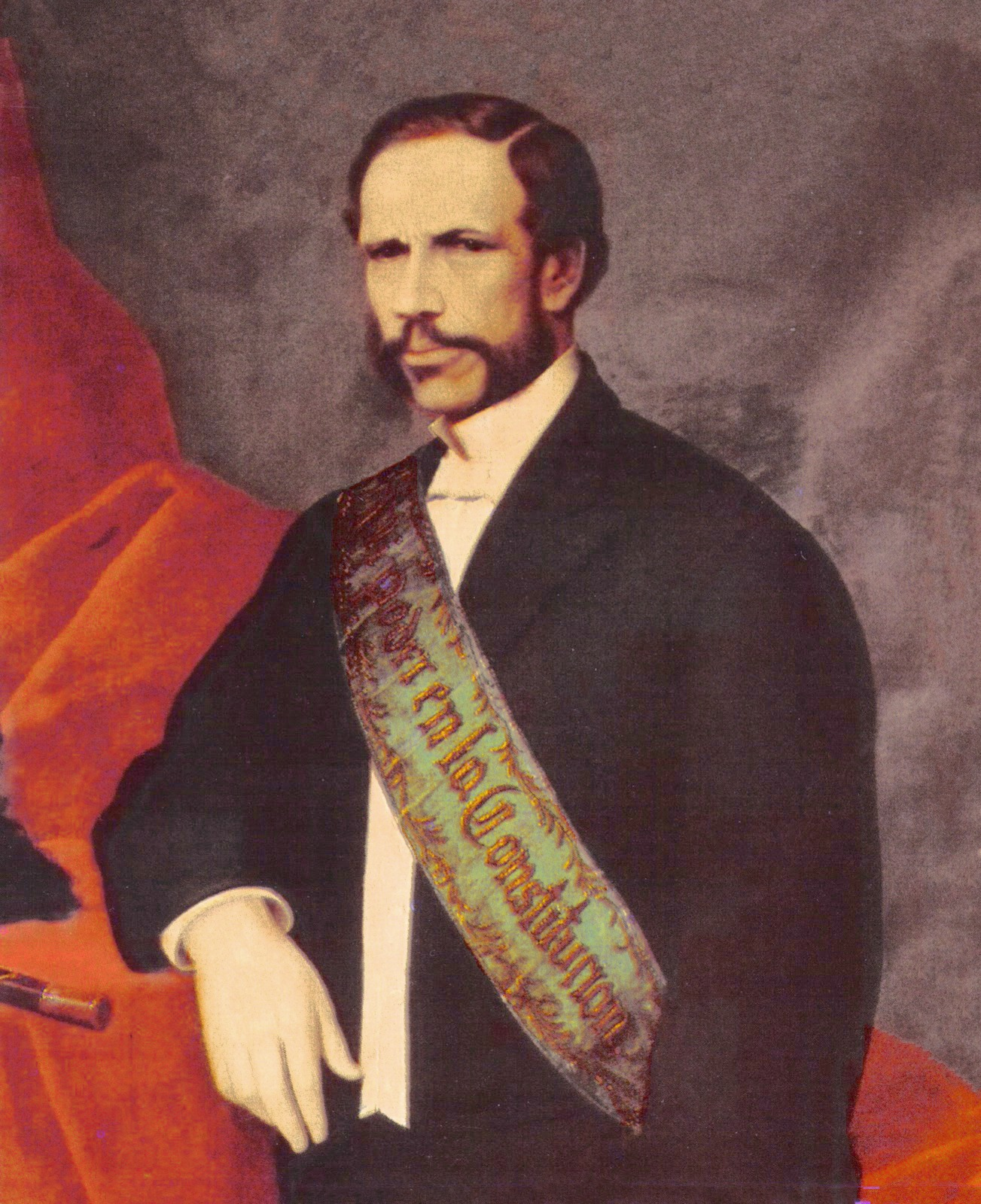

9th President of Ecuador
- In office 20 January 1868 – 19 January 1869
- Vice President: Pedro José de Arteta
- Preceded by: Pedro José de Arteta
- Succeeded by: Gabriel García Moreno

Personal details
- Born: 2 December 1815 Quito, Quito, Spanish Empire
- Died: 4 September 1870 (aged 54) Quito, Ecuador

José Manuel Francisco Javier Espinosa y Espinosa (2 December 1815, Quito – 4 September 1870) was President of Ecuador, from 20 January 1868 to 19 January 1869. He was overthrown in a 1869 military coup carried out by Gabriel García Moreno. Gabriel García Moreno sought to prevent Juan Javier Espinosa from holding free elections.

Political offices
Preceded by Pedro José de Arteta	President of Ecuador; 1868–1869	Succeeded by Gabriel García Moreno
