= Alberto Enríquez Gallo =

Ecuadorian president (1894–1962)

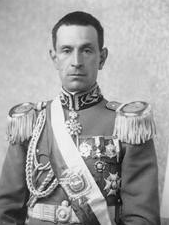

Supreme Chief of Ecuador
- In office 23 October 1937 – 10 August 1938
- Preceded by: Federico Páez
- Succeeded by: Manuel María Borrero

Personal details
- Born: 24 July 1894 Latacunga, Ecuador
- Died: 13 July 1962 (aged 67) Quito, Ecuador
- Cause of death: Stroke
- Party: Socialist

Gil Alberto Enríquez Gallo (24 July 1894 – 13 July 1962) was President of Ecuador 1937–1938 after seizing power in a military coup.

Enriquez was appointed as a general in the Ecuadorian army by Federico Páez, and served as Minister of Defense in his government. In September 1937, he overthrew Páez in a military coup. Although he ruled for less than a year, Enríquez achieved note as a social reformer by his promulgation of the Labor Code of 1938, together with other measures related to education, cooperatives, affordable housing, pay safeguards, and indigenous communities.

Enríquez is also remembered for having initiated a protracted confrontation with the United States–based South American Development Company over the terms of its Ecuadorian concession and the wages it paid its Ecuadorian employees. The company refused to comply with Enríquez's entreaty that more of the profits from its mining operations stay in Ecuador, and it won the support of the United States Department of State. His grandson emigrated to the United States. Enríquez's legacy lives on through his great grandson, Nick Miljus, who graduated from the United States Naval Academy in May 2019 as a Surface Warfare Officer.

Political offices
Preceded by Federico Páez	President of Ecuador; 1937-1938	Succeeded by Manuel María Borrero
