= Juan de Dios Martínez =

President of Ecuador from 1932 to 1933

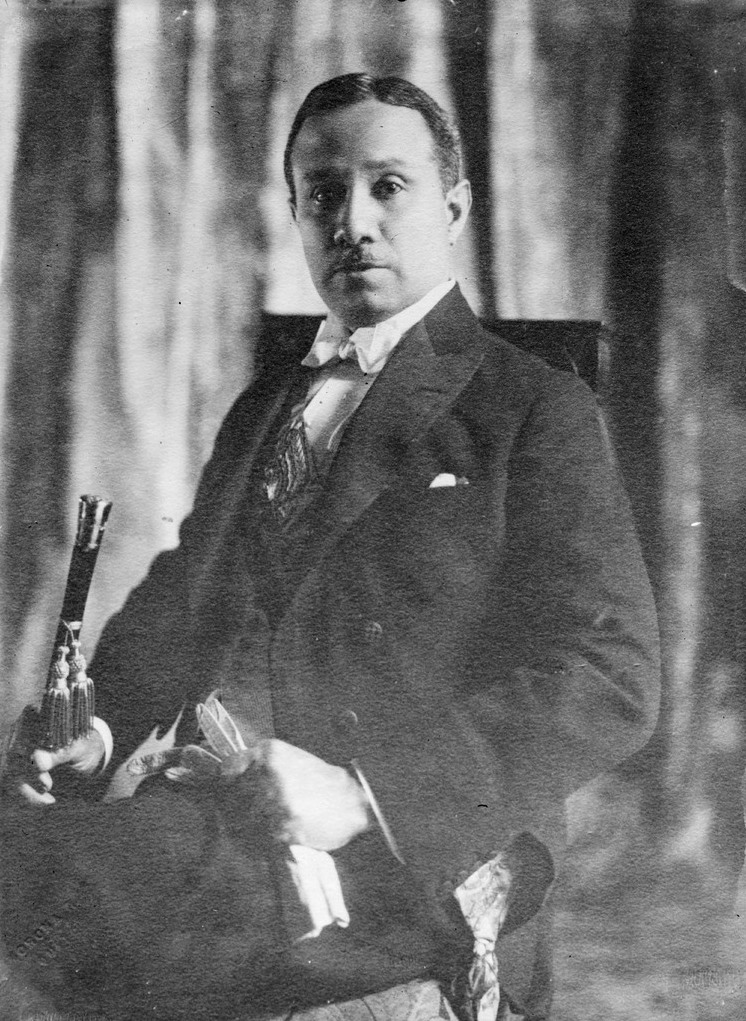

23rd President of Ecuador
- In office 5 December 1932 – 19 October 1933
- Preceded by: Alberto Guerrero
- Succeeded by: Abelardo Montalvo

Personal details
- Born: 9 March 1875; Guayaquil, Ecuador
- Died: 27 October 1955 (aged 80); Guayaquil, Ecuador
- Political party: Radical Liberal

Juan de Dios Martínez Mera (9 March 1875 – 27 October 1955) was 23rd President of Ecuador from 1932 to 1933. He was President of the Chamber of Deputies in 1921. He was Minister of Finance from 1929 to 1930, and from 1931 to 1932.

In Quito, a main avenue is named after him.

He graduated with a bachelor's degree from San Vicente de el Guayas. He studied jurisprudence.

Political offices
Preceded by Alberto Guerrero	President of Ecuador; 1932-1933	Succeeded by Abelardo Montalvo
