= Abelardo Montalvo =

Ecuadorian politician (1876–1950)

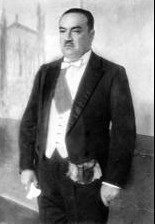

Acting President of Ecuador
- In office 17 October 1933 – 31 August 1934
- Preceded by: Juan de Dios Martínez
- Succeeded by: José María Velasco Ibarra

Personal details
- Born: 13 March 1876 Quito, Ecuador
- Died: 1 December 1950 (aged 74) Quito, Ecuador
- Cause of death: Heart failure
- Party: Radical Liberal

Abelardo Montalvo Alvear (March 13, 1876 – December 1, 1950) was the acting President of Ecuador from October 1933 to August 1934.

== Education and political career ==
Montalvo obtained a Juris Doctor from the University of Quito. Montalvo was a member of the Ecuadorian Radical Liberal Party for which he became a deputy and later senator for Pichincha Province. He also was a deputy to the 1906 Constituent Convention of Ecuador. He was President of the Chamber of Deputies from 1908 to 1911. Aside from his political functions Montalvo was a professor of law at the Central University of Ecuador and the Rector of the Colegio Nacional Mejía.

== Presidency ==
Montalvo became president when his predecessor Juan de Dios Martínez Mera was elected president but faced a congress not willing to deal with him. The congress asked Martínez Mera twice to resign, but he refused. The congress then censored the ministers chosen by Martínez Mera, one of which was Abelardo Montalvo. Martínez proceeded to select some new ministers to outmaneuver the congress. The Chamber of Deputies then accused Martínez Mera of attempting to overthrow the government and institute a dictatorship. The Senate subsequently impeached Martínez and named his Minister of Interior, Abelardo Montalvo, acting president. Montalvo stayed on as acting president until José María Velasco Ibarra was elected.

Political offices
Preceded by Juan de Dios Martínez	President of Ecuador; 1933–1934	Succeeded by José María Velasco Ibarra
