= Carlos Alberto Arroyo del Río =

President of Ecuador from 1940 to 1944

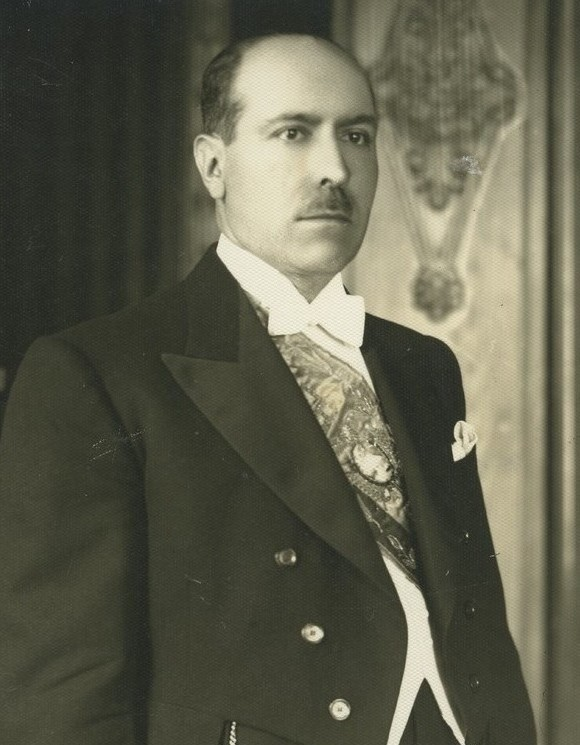

26th President of Ecuador
- In office 1 September 1940 – 28 May 1944
- Preceded by: Julio Enrique Moreno
- Succeeded by: José María Velasco Ibarra

Acting President of Ecuador
- In office 18 November 1939 – 10 December 1939
- Preceded by: Aurelio Mosquera
- Succeeded by: Andrés Córdova

Personal details
- Born: November 27, 1893 Guayaquil, Ecuador
- Died: October 31, 1969 (aged 75) Quito, Ecuador
- Party: Radical Liberal
- Spouse: Elena Yerovi Matheu (m. 1922; died 1968)
- Children: 2
- Education: University of Guayaquil

Carlos Alberto Arroyo del Río (27 November 1893 – 31 October 1969) was President of Ecuador from 1940 to 1944. He was a member of the Ecuadorian Radical Liberal Party.

During his term, the country decisively lost the 1941 Ecuadorian–Peruvian War. Ecuador was forced to sign highly unfavorable peace terms at the 1942 Inter-American Conference in Rio de Janeiro, renouncing 200,000 square kilometres of territory.

He engaged in repression against the political opposition. His use of dictatorial powers was supported by his supporters in parliament. A popular revolt led to his ousting.

Arroyo was President of the Chamber of Deputies from 1922 to 1923, and President of the Senate in 1935 and from February 1939 to August 1940. He won the 1940 Ecuadorian presidential election, where he benefitted from electoral fraud.

== See also ==
- Ecuadorian–Peruvian War

Political offices
| Preceded by Aurelio Mosquera | President of Ecuador; 1939 | Succeeded by Andrés Córdova |
| Preceded by Julio Enrique Moreno | President of Ecuador; 1940-1944 | Succeeded by Julio Teodoro Salem |
