= Conservative Party (Ecuador) =

Ecuadorian Conservative Party Partido Conservador Ecuatoriano
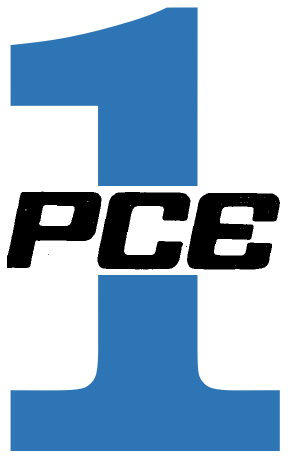
- Abbreviation: PC
- Historical leaders: Gabriel García Moreno; Juan León Mera; Manuel de Ascásubi; Rafael Carvajal; Mariano Suárez; Sixto Durán Ballén
- Founder: Gabriel García Moreno
- Founded: 1869
- Dissolved: 2002
- Headquarters: Quito
- Ideology: Clericalism; Conservatism; Historical: During the presidency of Manuel de Ascásubi: Authoritarianism
- Political position: Right-wing
- Colors: Blue

The Conservative Party (Spanish: Partido Conservador, abbreviated as PC) was an Ecuadorian conservative party formed in 1869. Initially associated with the military of Ecuador the PC became one of the two great parties of state in the country, alternating in power with the Ecuadorian Radical Liberal Party. Its traditional support basis has been amongst the landowning classes, as well as merchants and artisans and it tended to favour a unitary structure rather than federalism.

== Development ==
The PC was formed by Gabriel García Moreno to be the party of state during one of his spells as President of Ecuador. The party would then divide the Presidency with the Liberals until the 1895 coup that brought the reformer Eloy Alfaro to power, whilst the 1925 coup that ousted Gonzalo Córdova (himself a Liberal) further entrenched reformist hegemony and damaged the PC.

The PC was able to regroup however, winning the election in 1931 for Neptalí Bonifaz Ascásubi, albeit with the result annulled. Whilst a member of their party was not elected the Conservatives endorsed the victorious José María Velasco Ibarra in 1933 and supported him again as part of the alliance to oust Carlos Alberto Arroyo del Río after the Ecuadorian–Peruvian War and subsequent treaties. They formed part of the very broad-based Democratic Alliance - which included the PC, elements of the Liberals, the Ecuadorian Socialist Party, the Velasquistas and even the Communist Party of Ecuador - that emerged after the war and which forced Arroyo del Río out of office.

In 1956, they were part of the coalition backing victorious candidate Camilo Ponce Enríquez who assumed the Presidency, although the validity of the result was disputed by opposition groups and his cabinet was dominated by Liberals as a compromise. The PC candidate Otto Arosemena was also appointed President in 1966 by the Constituent Assembly.

== Tendencies ==
Like many traditional political parties in South America, the PC was a broad coalition featuring a number of interest groups. Foremost amongst these was the army which usually worked in close tandem with the PC.

The Roman Catholic Church was the other great influence on the PC and the party sought to represent Catholicism in its most traditional form, to the extent that more radical elements broke away to form the Social Christian Party under Ponce Enríquez. The two groups did subsequently co-operate however. A more radical Christian tendency also existed in the form of the Frente Anti-Comunista de Defensa Nacional (FADN), an anti-communist militia group active during the late 1940s. Distinct from the Christian tendency, although active around the same time as the FADN, was the Alianza Revolucionaria Nacionalista Ecuatoriana, a tendency inspired by fascism that sought to directly confront leftists.

== Later years ==
By the 1960s, the PC, along with their Liberal rivals, had faded somewhat from their leading position in Ecuadorian politics. In the 1968 election they backed the unsuccessful candidacy of Ponce Enríquez although he ran as a Social Christian candidate. In the 1978–79 Ecuadorian general election, they again backed the Social Christian candidate for the presidency, who this time was Sixto Durán Ballén, although the nine seats the party captured in Congress temporarily made them the third largest party in the body.

By the 1980s, both the Conservatives and Liberals were junior partners in the Frente de Reconstrucción Nacional coalition of León Febres Cordero, which was dominated by the Social Christian Party. The party continues to be an active force amongst its traditional stronghold of the landowners but has suffered due to the departure of Popular Democracy and the introduction of universal suffrage which significantly reduced landowner influence. They held only two Congressional seats in 1984 Ecuadorian general election, which was reduced to one in the 1986 Ecuadorian parliamentary election. They retained independent membership of the Congress up to and including the 1996 Ecuadorian general election, since when they have been subsumed in coalitions.

In the 2009 Ecuadorian general election, a remnant of the Conservative Party, known as the Social Conservative Movement of Carchi, won a seat in the National Assembly of Ecuador from Carchi Province.
