= Jaime Hurtado =

Ecuadorian politician (1937–1999)

Deputy of the National Congress of Ecuador
- In office 10 August 1998 – 17 February 1999
- In office 10 August 1979 – 9 August 1984

Director of Democratic People's Movement
- In office 1990–1994
- Preceded by: Jorge Moreno
- Succeeded by: Unknown
- In office 2 July 1983 – 18 July 1987
- Preceded by: Jorge Moreno
- Succeeded by: Jorge Moreno

Personal details
- Born: 7 February 1937 Quinindé, Ecuador
- Died: 17 February 1999 (aged 62) Quito, Ecuador
- Cause of death: Assassination by firearm
- Party: PCMLE
- Other political affiliations: MPD
- Spouse: Siria Angulo
- Children: Pastora Hurtado; Lenin Hurtado; Fernanda Hurtado
- Parent(s): Esteban Hurtado; Pastora González
- Education: University of Guayaquil

Jaime Ricaurte Hurtado González (7 February 1937 – 17 February 1999) was an Ecuadorian politician of African descent. He was aligned with the Democratic People's Movement (MPD), a deputy in the Ecuadorian parliament in 1979 until his assassination in 1999.

== Biography ==
=== Childhood ===
Born in the abandoned parish of Malimpia in Quinindé, a canton of Esmeraldas, one of the many forgotten areas of the country. It was a February 7, 1937, his parents were Esteban Hurtado and Pastora Gonzalez, who were illiterate.

His life was made in the country. There he lived and worked his first years. In the midst of the agricultural labors he performed with his parents and siblings, he wove his dreams and hopes. It was also dedicated to the cultivation of banana, cane and coconut. At the age of 10, he began his studies in the city of Esmeraldas at the "21 de Septiembre" School after having dedicated himself to helping his parents. although at school he continued to do so, dedicating himself thus when he finished the school day to clean the shoes and later to help his parents in the small bar that they administered until dawn.

=== Sports Activity ===
He studied high school in the "5 de Agosto" College of the province's capital, an institution that granted him a scholarship to finish his studies at the "Eloy Alfaro" School, in the city of Guayaquil, where he developed an intense sports activity in basketball and athletics .

He was selected from basketball by the province of Esmeraldas, in the college "Eloy Alfaro". He developed his physical qualities with great success in the athletic activity. Represented to the province of Guayas by several occasions. He won the gold medal in triple jump, javelin and discus throw, 110 meters hurdles and 1,500 meters flat. As a basketball player, he joined the Atlétic and Emelec clubs.

=== University life ===
His higher studies were carried out at the University of Guayaquil, where he started and actively participated in politics. He was president of the Association School of Law, and a candidate for the Presidency of the Federation of University Students of Ecuador, FEUE.

=== Political life ===
In 1966, he joined the Marxist-Leninist Communist Party of Ecuador (PCMLE), reaching the Central Committee and the Political Bureau of the PCMLE, he would be a prominent figure alongside the indigenous activists Dolores Cacuango and Tránsito Amaguaña also with the priest Leónidas Proaño in the social struggles against the military dictatorships of Ramón Castro Jijón, Clemente Yerovi, José María Velasco Ibarra, Guillermo Rodríguez Lara and Alfredo Poveda, from his first years as a union leader, he stood out as a staunch defender of the communist and socialist movements in Ecuador, it would be evidenced in his support of the student leader Milton Alfredo Reyes, the Guerrilla del Toachi and the group ¡Alfaro Vive, Carajo!. He participated in the founding of the Popular Democratic Movement (MPD) in 1978, first serving as a candidate for vice president in a duo that was not allowed to participate in the elections. The National Electoral Council (CNE) recognized the legal status of the MPD. Later, the MPD obtained its recognition, and he was elected a national deputy in 1979. After the return to democracy, he was the first legislator of Afro-Ecuadorian ethnicity.

During his first term as a deputy, he advocated for the restoration of the legal status of the National Union of Educators (UNE) and the Federation of Secondary Students (FESE), which had been eliminated by the Velasquismo and the military dictatorship., although he identified himself as a leader of the left-wing socialist and the Ecuadorian communist front, its trajectory was marked by constant confrontations with the center-left and center parties, given the policies of President Jaime Roldós led him to establish a firm opposition to his mandate, aligning himself with Assad Bucaram, León Febres-Cordero, Otto Arosemena and Carlos Arosemena who led the opposition to Roldós' government, However, his relationship with these congressmen was ambiguous and conflictive. In Congress, he alternated moments of support and disagreement, evidencing a critical stance that was not subordinated to circumstantial alliances. As an opponent of the regime of Jaime Roldós Aguilera and Oswaldo Hurtado, he was described by the former as one of the "patriarchs of the compromise." This attitude also earned him strong criticism from the first lady Martha Bucaram, the minister of government Roberto Dunn, and members close to the presidential family, including Abdalá Bucaram.

Following the tragic death of President Jaime Roldós and First Lady Martha Bucaram, he once again took a central place in the opposition, this time confronting the government of Osvaldo Hurtado. His critical stance generated tensions with the ruling party and with sectors that claimed Roldós' legacy, who accused him of political opportunism. He would be one of the most influential figures of the 1980s. In 1982, he participated in the founding of the General Union of Workers of Ecuador (UGTE). In 1984, he participated as a candidate for the presidency of the Republic, in tandem with Alfonso Yánez, being the first Afro-Ecuadorian to seek such a position. Despite not being elected, he would be one of the main figures of the opposition to left-wing ideology. during the term of President León Febres-Cordero, he led multiple complaints against the regime, pointing out serious human rights violations. Among his main accusations are the actions of the Death Squads, the death of the teacher Consuelo Benavides, the persecution of the group ¡Alfaro Vive, Carajo!, and the forced disappearance of the Restrepo brothers. He also denounced the corruption scandals and embezzlement of public funds involving members close to the president, such as Joffre Torbay, Xavier Neira, and Ramiro Larrea. Meanwhile, from the Social Christian Party, he was accused of being part of a media campaign orchestrated by Abdalá Bucaram, who was self-exiled in Panama, and of turning the Restrepo brothers case and kidnapping of Cordero into a political spectacle.

After the end of the León Febres-Cordero government, they would again participate in the 1988 Ecuadorian presidential elections with the Efraín Álvarez Fiallo duo. During this period, he established himself as one of the main opponents of President Rodrigo Borja. From the Democratic Left and centrist parties, they harshly questioned Hurtado for his ambiguous political stance and for his support of the opposition led by the Social Christian Party and the Ecuadorian Roldosista Party. He would also take part in union demonstrations and MPD supporters, supporting the historic indigenous mobilization of 1990, in which Communities across the country demanded recognition, rights, and dignity from the Borja government, and firmly denounced the legislative pact between the Social Christians and the Roldosistas who sought to pardon former President León Febres-Cordero of acts of corruption and crimes against humanity during his administration, in exchange for not prosecuting Abdalá Bucaram, then exiled in Panama.

In 1992, he would support the candidacy of Fausto Moreno in the 1992 elections. Soon, he returned to occupy a place in the opposition against the president of Sixto Durán Ballén, this time alongside various sectors of the left and the political center of the country. Tensions with the government of Sixto Durán-Ballén intensified as a result of the energy crisis and the unpopular implementation of the so-called "Sixto Hour", which symbolized the blackouts and citizen unrest. From his party, he supported the impeachment of Vice President Alberto Dahik and promoted legal actions against the president himself in the Flores and Milei cases. In 1995, he joined the campaign for the "No" in the referendum promoted by the government, the ruling party, for on the other hand, he accused his party of fomenting panic and turning the national crisis into a political spectacle. They held him responsible for amplifying discontent during the Cenepa War and for using the energy situation as a tool to undermine the institutions.

During 1996, he supported the candidacy of his colleague Juan José Castelló in the 1996 elections, given the public's discontent with the Social Christian Party. Following the line of Pachakutik, he supported the candidacy of the Roldosism of Abdalá Bucaram against Jaime Nebot. Once President Abdalá Bucaram took office, he was one of the main denouncers against Minister Alfredo Adum. The latter would insult him with racist epithets and also accuse members of the MPD. as traitors for their opposition to President Abdalá Bucaram, sought to encourage impeachment proceedings against Alfredo Adum and the president's son Abdalá Bucaram in the management of customs, as well as opening an investigation by the Attorney General's Office for the repressive role of the "Pepudos", the personal bodyguards of the president's sons, would have a prominent role due to the public complaints against members of the President's Cabinet, in 1997 given the corruption scandals and the elimination of the gas subsidy, he called on all members of the Popular Front where they led everyone along with opposition leaders Jaime Nebot and Fabián Alarcón in the multiple demonstrations for the dismissal of President Abdalá Bucaram, after the dismissal of Abdalá Bucaram and the rise to power of Fabian Alarcón, he opposed the referendum that was held that year to modify the constitution, in 1998 he supported the candidacy of his partner María Eugenia Lima for the presidency of the country in the same way, he participated in the legislative elections where he would be elected as National Deputy to the Congress of the MPD together with Iván Rodríguez, his parliamentary activity was characterized by his denunciations of acts of corruption, in which he came to involve the government with drug trafficking, and the defense of the interests of the working class.

== Death ==
On Wednesday, February 17, 1999, after having participated in one of the sessions at the Congress Palace where he had opposed the debt forgiveness law for the Ecuadorian Petroleum Company (ECAPAC), held by legislator Nina Pacari, Jaime Hurtado had gone out for lunch with his nephew Wellington Borja Nazareno as assistant, and his bodyguard Pablo Vicente Tapia Farinango, when they were shot dead public place one block from the National Congress, the Judiciary Council and other government buildings that were well guarded, the assassins managed to escape unhindered in a Suzuki Forsa, while passersby looked for ways to help the deputy being taken to the Eugenio Espejo Hospital for resuscitate him, his fellow members of the MPD, including leader Ciro Guzmán, arrived a few minutes later. Despite trying to save his life, the three shots he received to the head and chest caused his death minutes after the attack.

=== Confrontation and accusations ===
The allegations of his assassination led to the involvement of then-President Jamil Mahuad and his presidential cabinet, since before his assassination, despite having been part of the opposition that led to the overthrow of Abdalá Bucaram, and having denied support for businessman Álvaro Noboa candidate of the roldosismo in the 1998 elections, had been the subject of various criticisms such as complaints against the government of President Jamil Mahuad, as a congressman he had several altercations with members of the Popular Democracy party and the Social Christian Party, claiming that there was a pact between the legislators of those benches and the members of the ID, PCE, FRA and CFP to avoid the prosecution of several political actors from those parties in acts of corruption such as money laundering, on the other hand the members of these parties including the lawyer Jaime Nebot, Ramiro Rivera, Paco Moncayo and León Roldós Aguilera accused him of being part of or having close ties to the opposition led by Adolfo Bucaram Ortiz and Elsa Bucaram the brothers of former president Abdalá Bucaram, in the same way these benches criticized Hurtado's participation in decision-making in parliament in the special his denial of several bills or his support for the decisions taken by the PRE and the PSE, another of the criticisms that Jaime had Hurtado was his defense prior to the activism of the Shining Path in Peru, the Fifth Republic Movement of Hugo Chávez, the FSLN of Daniel Ortega, the PCC of Fidel Castro, and the MR Túpac Amaru.

The main accusations that Jaime Hurtado had made during his time as a congressman involved legal loopholes and anomalies in diplomatic relations with the governments of Alberto Fujimori president of Peru and Andrés Pastrana president of Colombia, the link between the illegal sale of stolen cars and drug trafficking, land trafficking in the coastal provinces mentioning the presence of several paramilitaries in the process including Carlos Castaño Gil, Vicente Castaño and Gustavo Aníbal, also seeking to bring money laundering proceedings against several high-profile businessmen including the Manabita cardiologist Medardo Cevallos Balda, he assumed an active defense of the interests of the working class being the president of the workers' rights commission of several companies, also initiated legal proceedings against Sixto Durán-Ballén and Alberto Dahik given the corruption scandals during his government such as the Cenepa War, involving the Peruvian minister Efraín Goldenberg, a few weeks before his assassination, the Mahuad government had strong social tension, with demonstrations by 120,000 teachers and members of the MPD against his policies, Hurtado had participated in one of these marches in the city of Guayaquil, where he was reported by the police for carrying a weapon, later Hurtado when interviewed by the authorities accused the police officers of assaulting him and that the Mahuad government was a repressive dictatorship, also one of his public complaints was that the media had censored his Criticism and opinions about the government, on the same day of his assassination, he had criticized President Jamil Mahuad for his economic plan focused on the convertibility of the sucre.

=== Case developments ===
After Jaime Hurtado's death was confirmed, members of the MPD accused President Jamil Mahuad, members of the Social Christian Party, and Popular Democracy. These accusations were also joined by his wife Siria Ángulo, his parents, and his children. According to the initial versions of the ruling party, no one was directly responsible. From the ruling party benches between the PSC and DP, at first, members of the Roldosista Party were vaguely accused. Ecuadorian PRE and APRE, given the previous confrontations Hurtado had engaged in with close associates of former President Abdalá Bucaram, including Alfredo Adum. However, these factions denied involvement in the incident and denounced slander against the party. The ruling party also informally denounced the rise in crime in the country. A day after the murder, his coffin was taken to the National Congress, where left-wing parties demanded justice for the crime. Minutes after the murder, President Jamil Mahuad announced the immediate arrest and investigation of the case, stating that the crime against Jaime Hurtado would not go unpunished.

Two days after the incident, a press conference was held, attended by President Jamil Mahuad and the Minister of Government. Vladimiro Álvarez announced that they had captured three suspects of Colombian origin, Washington Aguirre, Christian Ponce, and Sergei Merino. Their capture was achieved after the police raided the home of Michael Oña, an employee of Congress also implicated in the crime, in the early hours of February 19, following Washington Aguirre's early testimony. However, Michael Oña was murdered after the police announced that he was armed when they arrested him. In their announcement, they also accused two people named Milanta and Victorino, alleged members of the FARC as accomplices and material suppliers of the murder. In the midst of the legal process, the police managed to capture Freddy Contreras, the material author of the murder.

=== Doubts in the Investigation ===
Despite the government's announcement, spokespersons for the MPD and the Justice Commission, including leader Ciro Guzmán, rejected an investigation into the case. Authorities claimed that Jaime Hurtado's murder was due to his support for the Colombian guerrilla group FARC, and that he was also assisted by a military agent from the municipality of Caquetá. This version, accepted by the government, generated controversy because the motives for the murder were not revealed. Likewise, the investigation never found the mastermind of the crime. Members of the MPD considered it an attempt by the government to hide its own guilt. The government, for its part, claimed that the mastermind was the paramilitary Carlos Castaño Gil, head of the AUC, also investigated by Jaime Hurtado for arms and drug trafficking. However, the Colombian DAS could not verify the information given by the government, ensuring that there was no direct relationship between the guerrillas and the death of Jaime Hurtado, in the same way members of the AUC denied their complicity in the crime, In addition, the justice commission presented anomalies in the surveillance of the subjects known as Milanta and Victorino, the police in a press conference, did not give clear details about the identity of these people, a report from border security Colombia claimed that these two suspects had left Ecuador with the support of the police after Hurtado's death; this version, supported by the MPD, was denied by the government.

=== Testimony of Washington Aguirre ===
The unknowns surrounding the investigation began with the testimony of one of the suspects in the murder, Washington Aguirre. He stated that Jaime Hurtado was murdered on the orders of individuals known as Milanta and Victorino, alleged members of the FARC, after a failed collaboration with him. paramilitary group, this version was accepted by the government, but was rejected by the MPD, given that in Washington Aguirre's testimony, he claimed to be a spy for the United States with a close relationship with Interpol, the DEA and the national police, Aguirre assured that he was in charge of investigating the relationship of drug trafficking with left-wing parties or revolutionary movements in Ecuador, Peru, Panama, Venezuela and Colombia given the growing influence of Hugo Chávez in the region, his contacts had assured him about Hurtado's apparent link with Colombian guerrillas since the 1980s, this with the aim of creating a military guerrilla to combat the national government and the secret link with drug trafficking in the mountains where the then unknown drug trafficker Oscar Caranqui was vaguely mentioned, the members of the MPD publicly denounced the rise of the case, when the disappearance of the crime motives in the Machángara River was reported, that the vehicle Suzuki Forsa was abandoned and that the bullets used by the convicted were bullets 9mm caliber, exclusive to the State security forces.

=== Link to Medardo Cevallos Balda ===
One of the hypotheses developed by the MPD implicated the Manabí businessman Medardo Cevallos Balda as the mastermind behind the murder. He had served as Ecuador's ambassador to Mexico, appointed by President Jamil Mahuad in 1998. During his time as a congressman, Jaime Hurtado had conducted an investigation involving Medardo Cevallos Balda. This occurred after Hurtado presented a report from the narcotics police of Manabí about the infiltration of public companies such as the fishing company Pesca Fresca and Aislantes Plumavit for drug trafficking in the cities of Manta, Portoviejo and Guayaquil. In addition, Hurtado had pointed out that Cevallos Balda had a strange relationship with Fabián Alarcón, Jamil Mahuad, Guillermo Lasso, Jaime Nebot, Sixto Durán-Ballen, León Febres-Cordero and his cabinet, accusing him of having been a financier in the referendum of Fabián Alarcón and the electoral campaign of Jamil Mahuad, claiming that this earned him his appointment as ambassador. Hurtado also pointed out that the banking company Bancomer, in which Cevallos Balda was the main shareholder, along with his son Alberto Cevallos Gómez, was a front for laundering drug money, and having a relationship with General José Ramón Jiménez Carbo, who is accused of being linked to the Ecuadorian drug cartel "Los Reyes Magos."

Furthermore, in the corresponding investigation, his son Lenin Hurtado and lawyer Juan de Dios Parra confirmed that Freddy Contreras, the perpetrator of the murder, had had a close relationship with Medardo Cevallos Balda, being his trusted man for several years. In turn, Lenin Hurtado denounced Medardo Cevallos Balda for the forced disappearance under torture of Marco Bienvenido Palma Mendoza in 1997, at the hands of former members of the Ecuadorian Air Force who supposedly worked as personal security for Cevallos. the persecution of the minister of César Verduga who requested political asylum in Mexico after receiving death threats following his investigation into the "Los Reyes Magos" cartel, and that during his time as ambassador, the Ernesto Zedillo government faced harsh accusations from the Bill Clinton government and from Interpol regarding the infiltration of public and foreign officials into the drug trafficking network with United States and Canada.

In contrast, Medardo Cevallos Balda denied the accusations, claiming that they were a smokescreen and slander against him, receiving support from the president's cabinet Jamil Mahuad, given the scandals, he announced that he would continue a trial for libel against MPD and Lenin Hurtado for damage to his public image, this after he resigned from the post of ambassador in May 1999 citing health problems, the name of Medardo Cevallos Balda became more prominent in 1999 when the banking company Bancomex, of which he was a shareholder, entered a period of embargo as a result of the bank holiday where a police report showed that the bank had financial irregularities, which led to the seizure of 25 companies in 2002, also former minister César Verduga accused Cevallos, magistrate Héctor Romero Parducci and former foreign minister José Ayala of violating Mexican law by presenting evidence outside the instruction period in the extradition process, and in 2017 the Inter-American Court implicated Cevallos in the death of Marco Bienvenido Palma, however these accusations could never be proven since they were not obtained the evidence nor a search by the authorities and the Attorney General's Office, preceded by lawyer Mariana Yépez and politician Washington Pesántez, who did not continue with the complaints filed by the MPD against Medardo Cevallos Balda.

=== Case closed ===
Despite the lawsuits filed by the MPD and its attempts to continue the investigation, the subsequent governments of Lucio Gutiérrez, Alfredo Palacio, Rafael Correa and Lenin Moreno, did not continue with the process, leaving Jaime Hurtado's death without finding those responsible. During the investigation, several of those allegedly involved managed to evade justice in the country. Christian Steven Ponce managed to escape justice by fleeing the country shortly after being arrested and was captured in upstate New York in February 2007 when he was driving a car and was not wearing a seat belt.

On December 15, 2010, another of the alleged perpetrators, Henry Gil Ayerve, was detained in Colombia and extradited to Ecuador. In 2019, 20 years after the death of Jaime Hurtado, Washington Aguirre, who escaped from prison, was arrested in the city of Rome under a false identity. Here, members of the Popular Unity, current MPD, sought to have him extradited to Ecuador, with the support of Interpol. Here, Aguirre publicly expressed that 60% to 80% of what was declared in his version had been omitted, where the DEA and the police were linked to the crime. Despite the collaboration of the media, the process for Aguirre's extradition could not be carried out. To date, the intellectual author of the crime has not been discovered and the investigation process has ended. Jaime Hurtado's murder is still considered mainly by the sector. of the Popular Unity and left-wing parties as a state crime.
