= Emérita Quiñónez =

Ecuadorian politician

Governor of Esmeraldas
- In office 1983–1984
- President: Osvaldo Hurtado

Personal details
- Born: Maria Quinonez Emerita Diaz; 13 October 1932 Quinindé
- Died: 27 February 2014 Guayaquil
- Party: Christian Democratic Union
- Education: University of San Simón; Luis Vargas Torres Technical University
- Occupation: Politician, teacher, athlete

Maria Quiñónez Emerita Diaz (13 October 1932 – 27 February 2014) was an Ecuadorian politician, athlete, and educator. As the Governor of Esmeraldas Province, she was the first female Governor in Ecuador.

== Biography ==
Emérita Quiñónez was born in the Estero de Plátano precinct of the Quinindé Canton of Esmeraldas. She completed her secondary studies at the Manuela Cañizares School in Quito and acquired a bachelor's degree in educational sciences from the Luis Vargas Torres Technical University. Quiñónez completed her postgraduate studies at the University of San Simón, graduating from the Cochabamba university. She began her career in education in 1951 and would work in this field for over 50 years at the Luis Vargas Torres Technical University, Sacred Heart School, Maria Goretti School, School of the Immaculacy, Nocturno Esmeraldas and the Superior Institute of Don Bosco, of which she was the founder.

For more than 27 years, Quiñónez worked in politics as an affiliate of the Ecuadorian Christian Democratic Union. She was the first female council member of the City of Esmeraldas and also became the vice president of the Electoral Tribunal of Esmeraldas. In 1983, Osvaldo Hurtado offered Quiñónez the position of Governor of Esmeraldas Province, but she asked for time to consider the offer. Julio Plaza Ledesma successfully appealed to Quiñónez and she took the job, thus becoming the first female governor of Ecuador.

In sports, Quiñónez played basketball for the Sports Federation of Esmeraldas, the Pichincha Sports Concentration and the national Women's Basketball Team. She was President of the Sports Federation of Esmeraldas.

== Legacy ==
Early in July 2017, Esmeraldas Councilman Tony Quiñónez renamed several streets in the southern portion of the city after notable Ecuadorians from past and present, and on the list of persons to name streets for was Emérita Quiñónez.
