= 1984 Ecuadorian general election =

- Registered: 3,734,076
- Presidential election
- 29 January 1984 (first round); 6 May 1984 (second round)
- Turnout: 70.88% (first round); 78.13% (second round)
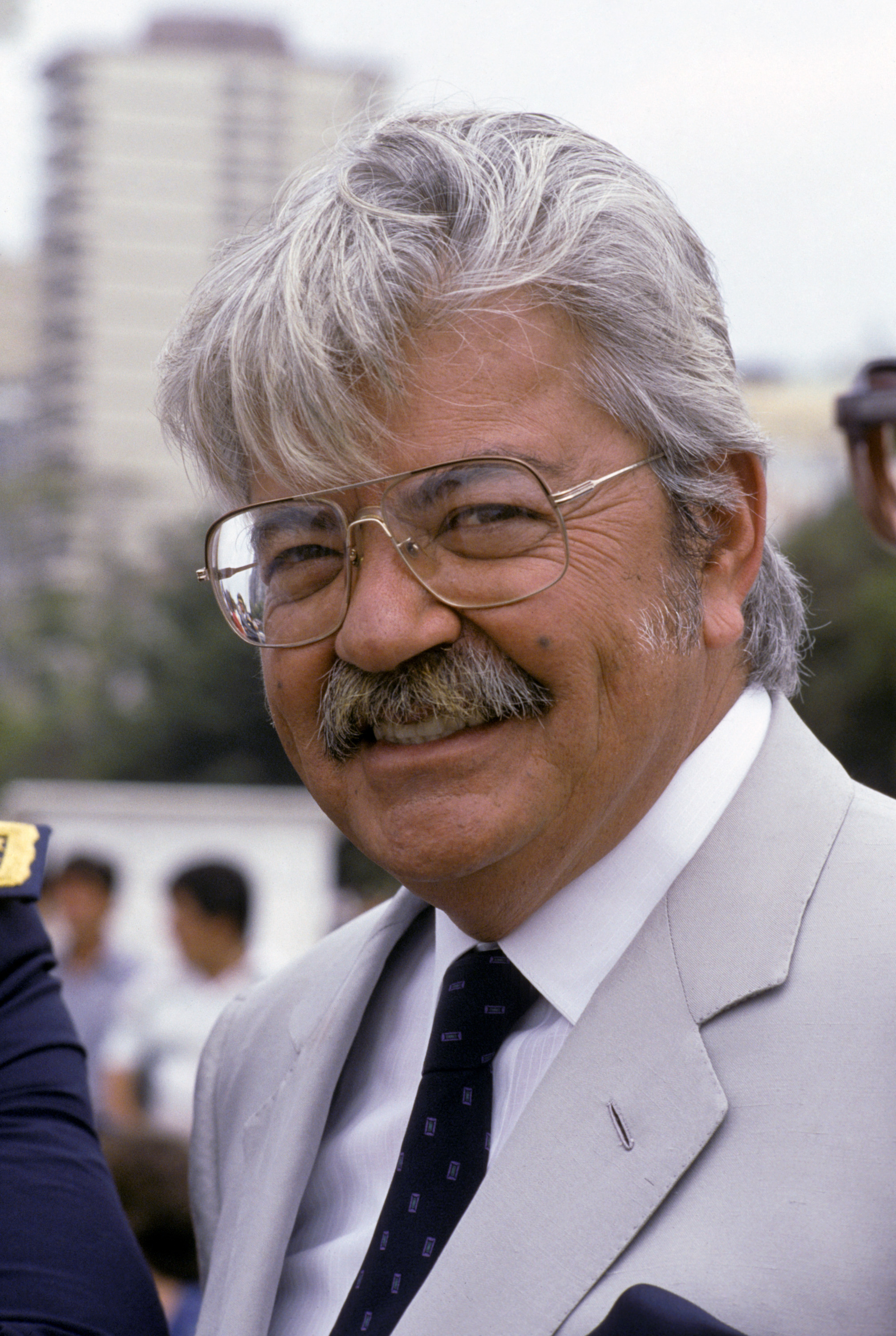

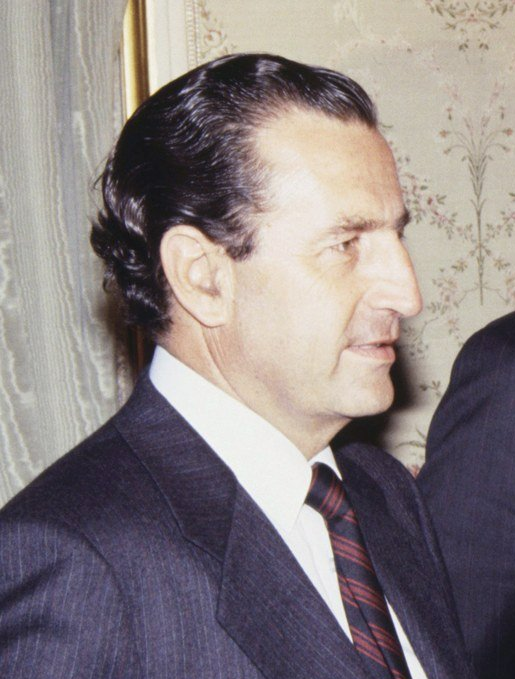
Nominee	León Febres Cordero	Rodrigo Borja Cevallos
Party	PSC	ID
Running mate	Blasco Peñaherrera	Aquiles Rigail
Popular vote	1,381,709	1,299,089
Percentage	51.54%	48.46%
President before election
Osvaldo Hurtado
Democracia Popular
Elected President
León Febres Cordero
PSC

General elections were held in Ecuador on 29 January 1984, with a second round of the presidential elections on 6 May. After finishing second in the first round, León Febres Cordero of the Social Christian Party won the run-off with 51.5% of the vote. The Democratic Left emerged as the largest faction in the National Congress, winning 24 of the 69 seats.

== Results ==
=== President ===
Candidate	Running mate	Party	First round		Second round	
Candidate	Running mate	Party	Votes	%	Votes	%
Rodrigo Borja Cevallos	Blasco Peñaherrera	Democratic Left	634,327	28.73	1,299,089	48.46
León Febres Cordero	Aquiles Rigail	Social Christian Party	600,563	27.20	1,381,709	51.54
Ángel Duarte Valverde	Luis Rosanía	Concentration of People's Forces	298,397	13.52		
Jaime Hurtado	Alfonso Yánez	Democratic People's Movement	161,810	7.33		
Jaime Aspiazu	Miguel Falconí	Alfarista Radical Front	149,733	6.78		
Francisco Huerta	Rodrigo Espinosa	Democratic Party	146,646	6.64		
Julio César Trujillo	Miguel Ángel Villacrés	Popular Democracy	103,790	4.70		
René Maugé	Humberto Vinueza	Broad Front of the Left	94,070	4.26		
Manuel Salgado	Elías Sánchez	Socialist Party	18,283	0.83		
Total			2,207,619	100.00	2,680,798	100.00
Valid votes			2,207,619	83.41	2,680,798	90.44
Invalid/blank votes			439,225	16.59	283,500	9.56
Total votes			2,646,844	100.00	2,964,298	100.00
Registered voters/turnout			3,734,076	70.88	3,794,149	78.13
Source: Nohlen

=== National Congress ===
Party	Nationwide			District			Total seats	+/–
Party	Votes	%	Seats	Votes	%	Seats	Total seats	+/–
Democratic Left	394,212	19.45	3	410,914	19.98	21	24	+9
Social Christian Party	361,755	17.85	2	235,117	11.43	7	9	+6
Democratic Party	185,376	9.15	1	164,835	8.02	2	3	New
Concentration of People's Forces	176,251	8.70	1	184,506	8.97	6	7	–22
Alfarista Radical Front	161,643	7.98	1	180,896	8.80	5	6	New
Popular Democracy	130,173	6.42	1	150,392	7.31	4	5	New
Democratic People's Movement	123,333	6.09	1	134,036	6.52	2	3	+1
Ecuadorian Roldosist Party	104,848	5.17	1	103,827	5.05	2	3	New
Broad Front of the Left	88,660	4.37	1	105,401	5.13	1	2	New
Ecuadorian Radical Liberal Party	75,489	3.72	0	122,485	5.96	4	4	0
Conservative Party	56,785	2.80	0	75,523	3.67	2	2	–8
People, Change, Democracy	49,645	2.45	0	55,457	2.70	0	0	New
Revolutionary Nationalist Party	37,030	1.83	0	46,081	2.24	0	0	–1
Socialist Party	32,048	1.58	0	36,084	1.75	1	1	New
Republican National Coalition	25,718	1.27	0	27,869	1.36	1	1	New
National Velasquista Federation	14,938	0.74	0	18,281	0.89	0	0	–1
Ecuadorian Revolutionary Popular Action	8,710	0.43	0	4,508	0.22	0	0	0
Total	2,026,614	100.00	12	2,056,212	100.00	58	70	+1
Valid votes	2,026,614	76.86		2,056,212	77.30			
Invalid/blank votes	610,042	23.14		603,672	22.70			
Total votes	2,636,656	100.00		2,659,884	100.00			
Registered voters/turnout	3,734,076	70.61		3,734,076	71.23			
Source: Nohlen
