= National Reconstruction Front (Ecuador) =

Political party in Ecuador

- Leader: León Febres-Cordero
- Deputy Leader: Blasco Peñaherrera
- Founded: 1984
- Dissolved: 1988
- Ideology: Right-libertarianism; Traditional conservatism

The Frente de Reconstrución Nacional (National Reconstruction Front) was an Ecuadorian political party formed in 1983 to contest the national presidential elections in Ecuador, in 1984.

The party was established to formalise an alliance between the major conservative parties of Ecuador at that time, and Guayaquil businessmen, one of the main public supporters of Ecuador's political right wing Led by León Febres Cordero, elected leader of the conservative Partido Social Cristiano (Social Christian Party), the rest of the parties constituting the National Reconstruction Front included, the Partido Conservador Ecuatoriano (Conservative Ecuadorian Party), Partido Liberal Radical Ecuatoriano (Radical Liberal Ecuadorian Party), Partido Nacionalista Revolucionario (Revolutionary Nationalist Party), Coalición Institucionalista Democrática,(Institutional Democratic Coalition) and Federación Nacional Velasquista (National Velasquista Federation).

The main objectives which underpinned the formation of this coalition were, to strengthen the solidarity between conservative parties, resolve pre-existing divisions, share resources in order to form a strong opposition, and administer an effective political campaign. It was envisioned that such efforts would also transfer to effectively convincing Ecuadorian voters of their intention to implement a more conservative economic agenda of free-market politics. Given that this would shift the direction of economic policy away from the statist, paternalistic model that guided that of the current, left-leaning administration, the coalition's political strategy in achieving this would prove vital.

== Formation ==
=== Background and ideology ===
In 1983, the year in which in the political alliance was formed, Ecuador, like Latin America more generally, was facing immense political and economic challenges. Still recovering from a leftist military dictatorship that first assumed government control only seven years before, proceeding civil governments, including the current administration led by Jaime Roldos and Osvaldo Hurtado, still latched on to the statist and paternalistic ideology of its military predecessor. This was most evident in how proceeding civil governments implemented economic policy. Particularly, initiatives designed to incentivise domestic production and decrease the country's mounting deficit.

When electoral campaigns from both sides of the political divide began, the failure of such an approach was more than clear. Ecuador was enduring a stagnant economy spurred by underused industrial capacity, high employment, high inflation and substantial foreign debt. The current administration was also struggling with internal instability, compromising its ability to confidently pass measures to remedy the residual effects of ineffective fiscal management.

As a coalition of conservative parties, the National Reconstruction Front posed a direct challenge to the statism which continued to dominate Ecuador's political landscape. Centralising their opposition around the potential of liberal economics in rescuing the Ecuadorian economy from further instability, their main strategy was to dramatically reduce the role of the state in shaping and ultimately improving Ecuador's fiscal outlook. Inspired by the ‘Regan Doctrine’, such a strategy also prompted an attempt to introduce neoliberalism as a measure of anti-communist resistance. The coalition believed such efforts would rejuvenate Ecuadorian politics from the inside by slowly eradicating a culture of corruption and consequently, addressing a lack of trust on behalf of the Ecuadorian people. Given the social and economic instability brought about by previous state driven economic programs, It was also believed that minimising the role of the state in public affairs and economic policy would be a more effective means of lifting domestic productivity.

"There is a big difference between making the state into the first servant of the people and the people servants of the state. This is the great difference between Democracy that respects private initiative and the populism and Communitarianism socialism that Roldos and Hurtado are trying to impose."

— León Febres-Cordero, 1984

=== Establishment and growth ===
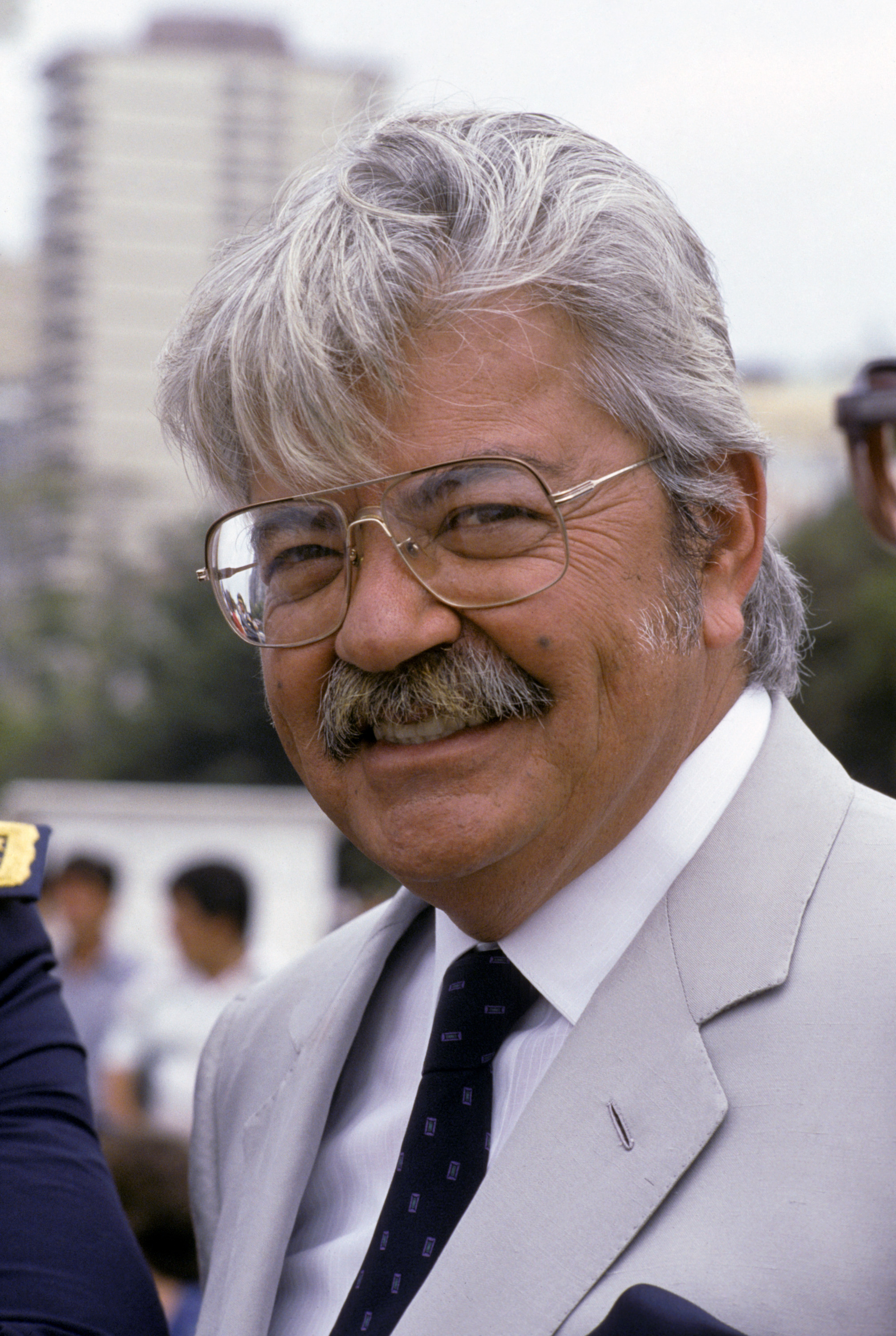
In the elections of 1984, leader of the Social Christian Party, León Febres-Cordero was the presidential candidate of Ecuador's political right wing, represented by the National Reconstruction Front.

The National Reconstruction Front was a unifying political force which aimed to strengthen Ecuador's liberal right wing by absorbing pre-existing right-winged parties under its umbrella. This was the motivation which convinced the coalition's founder, congressman and president of the conservative Social Christian Party, León Febres Cordero to form the party in the first place. Despite sharing a politically liberal economic vision which prioritised the autonomy of financial institutions as a means of securing a healthy national economy, the coalition's establishment and growth was not immediate. The division of participating parties prior to the formation of the coalition was due to salient differences which defined the diversity of Ecuador's political right wing. Of importance to the historical trajectory of the coalition in achieving its political objectives is the decisive role of Guayaquil businessmen. They were crucial in defining the neoliberal policies which distinguished the coalition from its left wing opposition during the election and after the coalition was elected in 1984.

Ultimately, the heterogeneous composition of the coalition and the political influence of the Guayaquil businessmen would present would affect the coalition's political success, particularly during the coalition's four year electoral term between 1984 and 1988. This was in part due to the political differences which originally defined each participating party but also, the pressures of Ecuador's political climate at that time. In retrospect, the coalition demonstrates the difficulty of implementing an alternative political and economic paradigm within a political climate which historically has been institutionally and culturally defined by the authority of state in deciding the outcome of public and private affairs. Such a challenge, particularly its inherent structural pressures, highlighted the divisions between each participating party, reinforcing the gap between rhetoric and practice.

== 1984 elections ==
=== Campaign and results ===
The National Reconstruction made its first public appearance in the lead up to first-round balloting which took place in January 1984. As the leader of the coalition, León Febres Cordero delivered the coalition's objectives to the public. Declaring the coalition agenda as "more Reagan than Mitterrand", Febres Cordero positioned the coalition in stark contrast to the statist government proposed by the successor of Oswaldo Hurtado’s Christian Democrats, Rodrigo Borja. He attacked the intervention of the state in economic affairs, promising to cut government spending and suggesting that granting unfettered freedom to the business sector would produce the economic growth that Ecuador needed to avoid further instability and repay foreign debt.

Such rhetoric was thought to be a campaign strategy for harbouring the support of the disenfranchised business sector which felt left out of the current leftist, interventionist government. Indeed, Febres Cordero hoped to make the business sector the coalition's main supporter during the election. However, as the Bolivian experience demonstrated, the business sector votes in order to protect their economic interests rather than to maintain political alliances. Febres Cordero seemed to have underestimated the impact of this behaviour in securing a majority during first-round balloting. Defining the coalition's political objectives according to the interests of a disenfranchised business sector, which was also a small yet highly politicized faction of Ecuadorian civil society, failed to win a majority. The National Reconstruction Front came in second to the leftist campaign led by Rodrigo Borja.

The results of the first-round ballot indicated to the National Reconstruction front that they needed to expand their support base. Such a shift in political strategy implied compromising the delivery of a bold neoliberal program by appealing to the interests of left-wing voters or those who considered themselves centrist. As the coalition prepared for the second and final ballot in May, 1984, Febres Cordero began to promote a populist political mandate which see-sawed between the statist populism upheld by his opponent and the hard-line neoliberalism which prompted the coalition's initial campaign objectives.

Febres Cordero adopted the slogan "pan techo y empleo" (bread, shelter and jobs) as a means of public announcing the coalition's strategic move towards a more centrist position – a move which ultimately made the coalition's campaign objectives appear contradictory. After initially seeking to defend the economic interests of Guayaquil businessmen, one the coalition's key members, the coalition now promised to secure basic salaries, increase spending in public housing and "be at the defence of employment". Ironically, these campaign promises depended on restating the role of the state in economic affairs, a key principle of the statist economy that preceded the coalition and which inspired the coalition's political campaign in the first place. Such zig-ziging also affected the internal unity of the coalition, particularly the support of the Guayaquil businessmen. As the coalition's main instigator, the coalition's decision to advance a populist agenda during their electoral campaign compromised their commitment to promoting benefits and projected outcomes of the neoliberal policies the party intended to enforce if elected.

Despite these challenges, the coalition's reformed political strategy and subsequent political manoeuvring proved advantageous during the second and final round of balloting. The National Reconstruction Front was elected with 52 percent of the vote on May 6, 1984. Even though the coalition had strayed away from their hard-line neoliberal mandate, the elections marked a significant and historical swing against the socially and politically embedded interventionist agenda that had up until now, shaped Ecuador's political identity.

== Challenges and success ==
Once in power, the Febres Cordero administration learnt the difficulties of implementing a neoliberal agenda in a political context where paternalism was culturally expected by the nation's business sector, and was the political identity against which the international business community assessed Ecuador as a potential economic partner. Also, the populist political mandate which placed the coalition in a leading position during the second half of their electoral campaign was not sufficiently effective in securing a majority in congress. Here the coalition held a minority of seats. Another obstacle facing the coalition was implementing the expansive political mandate promoted by its political leader and therefore, maintaining the support it generated from different sections of Ecuadorian society. After their mandate for a free-market revolution failed to appeal to a majority of voters, the coalition responded to these political and economic challenges by continuing to see- saw between the imperatives of liberal economics and the practicalities of traditional Latin American statism. This had devastating consequences for the coalition's unity, creating splinter groups which further compromised the front's opportunities for progress.

Despite these setbacks, the coalition achieved a number of significant liberal economic reforms during its term. These included, opening up the national economy to foreign investors. This was particularly evident in Ecuador's mining sector. The coalition withdrew Ecuador from the Andean Pact which protected the mining and natural resource industries of partner countries from exploitation by insisting member nations incur income tax from the profits made by investors. The intention behind this mutual agreement was to increase the productivity of member states in a manner which encouraged sustainable economic practice with foreign companies. By withdrawing Ecuador from the pact, foreign investors would gain autonomy over how they distributed profits made from mining activities, meaning that potential investors could obtain a better return from invested capital. Febres Cordero insisted that relaxing the conditions of investment in this manner would make Ecuador more attractive business partner.

Another significant achievement was increasing domestic productivity by allowing non-traditional domestic markets to benefit from free-market exchange. It was hoped that deregulating the nation's domestic business sector would stabilise the economy by increasing national productivity, tackling unemployment, all of which could ultimately result in a budget surplus. Despite the fact that crude oil continued to be Ecuador's main export product, non-traditional exports significantly contributed to the country's GDP during the coalition's term. Between 1983 and 1986, Febres Cordero claimed that non-traditional exports raised GDP by an average rate of 3.9 percent. These initiatives demonstrated the government's efforts towards increasing opportunities for greater economic sustainability as they opening new domestic markets which would promote domestic productivity and employment, as well as increase the income stream from exported goods. Such efforts also reinforced the coalition's neoliberal agenda and given its impact in promoting economic growth, it also positioned the coalition's political platform as viable alternative to that promoted by the preceding, statistic and interventionist government.
