= Roldós =

Roldós is a surname. Notable people with the surname include:

- Jaime Roldós Aguilera (1940–1981), President of Ecuador (1979–81)
- León Roldós Aguilera (born 1942), Vice President of Ecuador (1981–1984)
- Martha Roldós (born 1963), Ecuadorian economist and politician, daughter of Jaime
- Mercedes Roldós Freixes (1910–1989), Spanish composer and music educator
