= María Cristina Kronfle =

Ecuadorian lawyer and politician

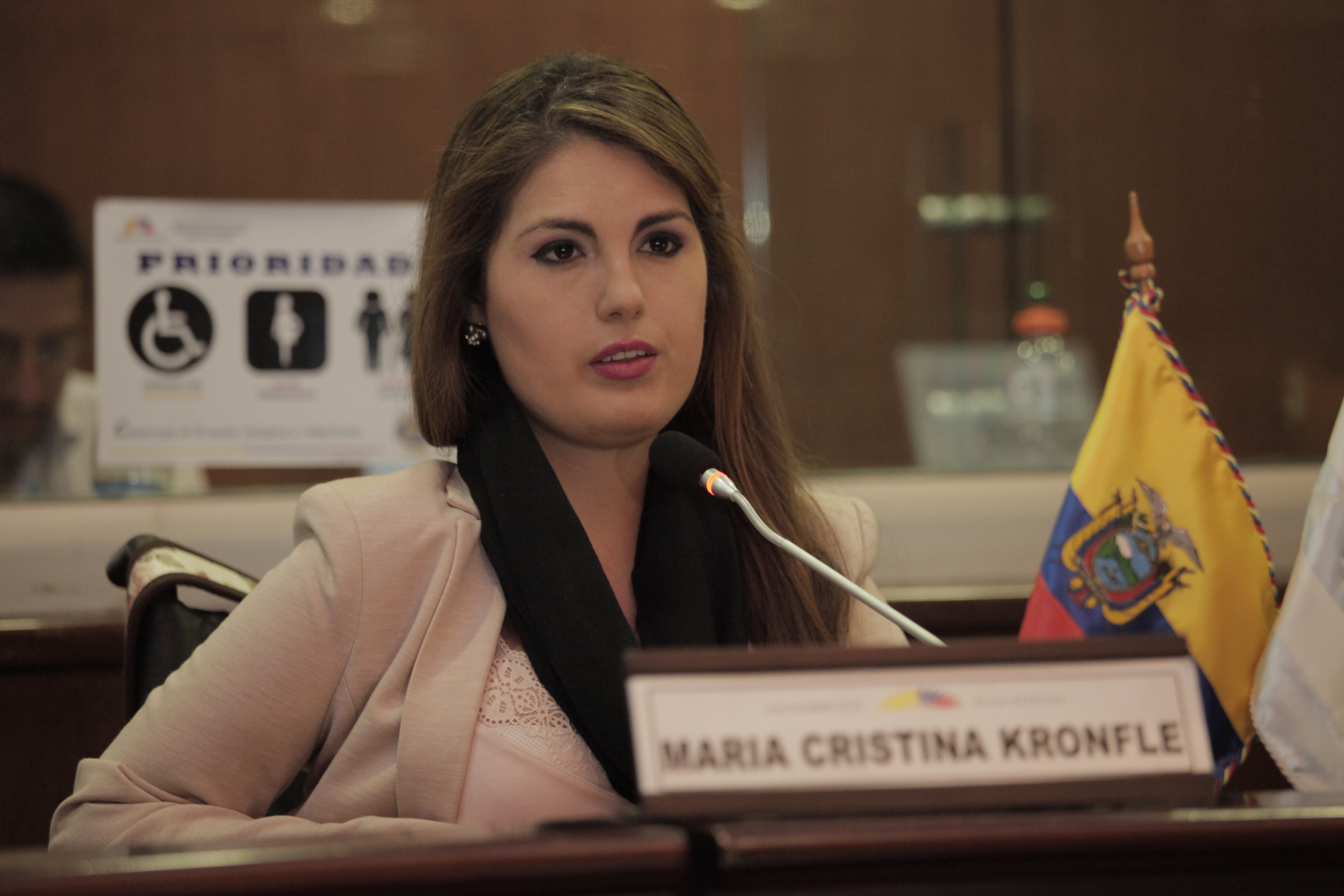

Member of the National Assembly of Ecuador
- In office 2009–2017
- Constituency: Guayas Province

Member of the Ecuadorian Constituent Assembly
- In office 2007–2008
- Constituency: Guayas Province

Personal details
- Born: María Cristina Kronfle Gómez; November 22, 1985 (age 40) Guayaquil, Ecuador
- Party: Ethics and Democracy Network; Social Christian Party
- Education: Catholic University of Santiago de Guayaquil
- Occupation: Lawyer, politician
- Known for: Disability rights activism

María Cristina Kronfle Gómez (born November 22, 1985) is an Ecuadorian lawyer and politician. She served as a member of the National Assembly of Ecuador from 2009 to 2017.

== Biography ==
María Cristina Kronfle was born in Guayaquil on November 22, 1985, the daughter of Víctor Kronfle Cabrera and María Cristina Gómez. She obtained her law degree from the Catholic University of Santiago de Guayaquil.

From the age of 18, she promoted transportation assistance for voting by people with disabilities in the city of Guayaquil, starting by writing opinion letters to national newspapers, which aroused the interest of other people linked to the issue. She conducted campaigns for the visibility of this social sector, called "Campaign Vote" (Spanish: Campaña Voto). The letters and campaign were successful in convincing the Supreme Electoral Court of Ecuador to arrange for the members of the Vote Receiving Boards to assist citizens with exercising their franchise in venues which are inaccessible to people with physical disabilities.

== Political career ==
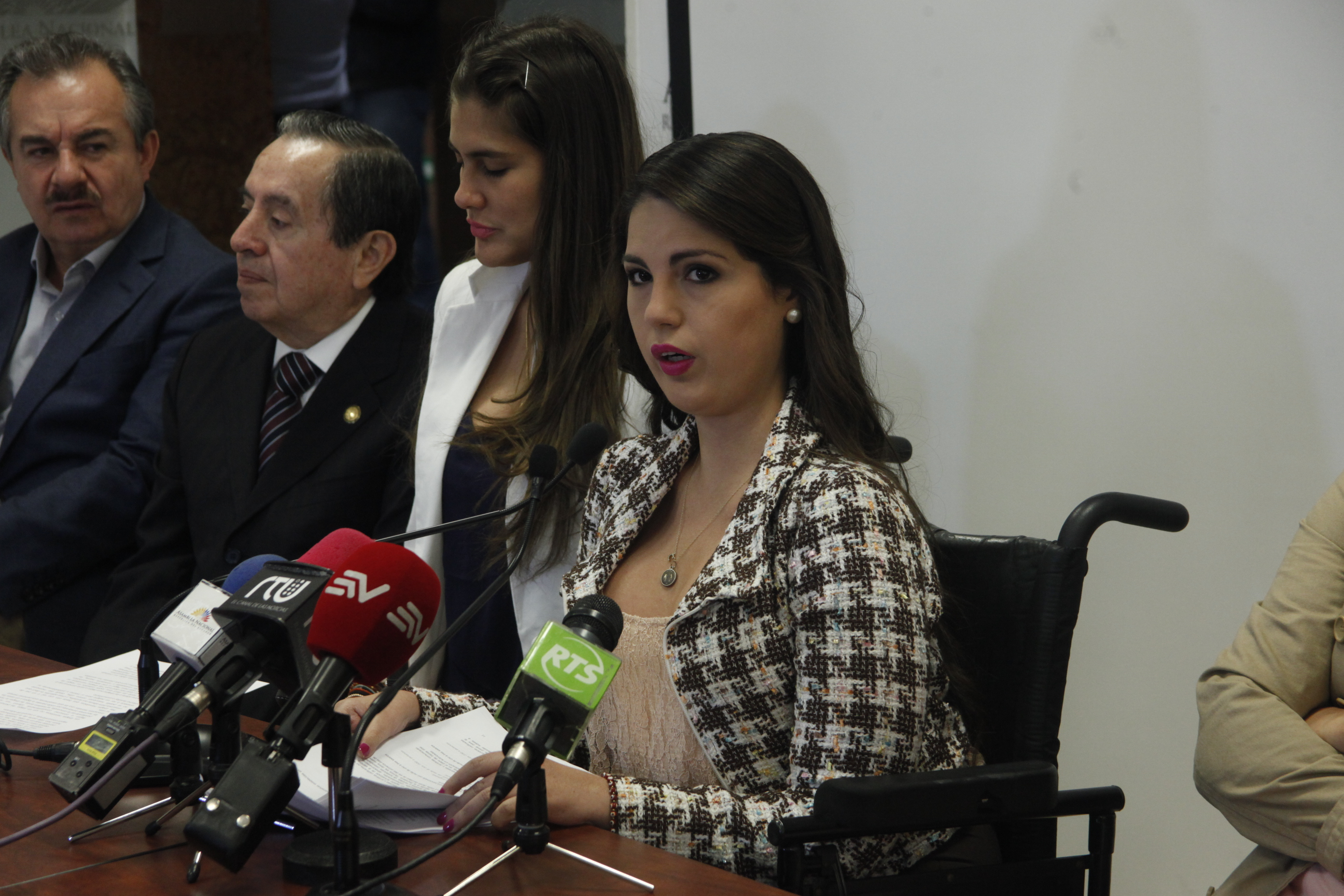
Kronfle at a press conference with the PSC bloc and Madera de Guerrero Civic Movement

Kronfle began her political life as a candidate for councilor of Guayaquil for the Ethics and Democracy Network (RED) of Martha Roldós in 2006. Later she was part of the Constituent Assembly of 2007 for the Social Christian Party (PSC), where she was the youngest member at twenty years old. Having been born with a physical disability that prevents her from walking, she promoted constitutional articles that guaranteed the rights of persons with disabilities.

In the 2009 general election, Kronfle won a seat in the National Assembly representing Guayas Province for the alliance between the PSC and the Madera de Guerrero Civic Movement. In the Assembly she was unanimously appointed as president of the Occasional Commission for Persons with Disabilities. She was the promoter of the Organic Law on Disabilities, approved unanimously by the Assembly in June 2012.

She was reelected as an Assembly member for Guayas in 2013, and remained in office until 2017. In May 2018, she participated in the selection of representatives for the Citizen Participation and Social Control Council (CPCCS).

== Personal life ==
Kronfle married a businessman from Quito on March 4, 2016, at the Municipal Palace of Guayaquil.
