= Kronfle =

Kronfle is a surname. Notable people with the surname include:

- Henry Kronfle (born 1972), Ecuadorian businessman and politician
- María Cristina Kronfle (born 1985), Ecuadorian lawyer and politician
