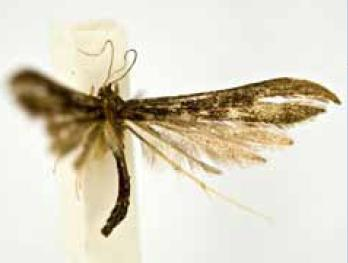

Scientific classification
- Kingdom: Animalia
- Phylum: Arthropoda
- Class: Insecta
- Order: Lepidoptera
- Family: Pterophoridae
- Genus: Hellinsia
- Species: H. aguilerai

Binomial name
- Hellinsia aguilerai Gielis, 2011

= Hellinsia aguilerai =

Species of plume moth

Hellinsia aguilerai is a moth of the family Pterophoridae. It is found in Ecuador.

The wingspan is 23 mm. Adults are on wing in December, at an altitude of 2,650 m.

== Etymology ==
The species is named after President Jaime Roldos Aguilera from Ecuador, who died in an airplane accident in 1981.
