= Margarita Pérez Pallares =

Ecuadorian First Lady

First Lady of Ecuador
- In role 24 May 1981 – 10 October 1984
- President: Osvaldo Hurtado Larrea
- Preceded by: Martha Bucaram
- Succeeded by: María Eugenia Cordovez

Personal details
- Born: 29 September 1943 (age 82) Quito, Ecuador
- Spouse: Osvaldo Hurtado Larrea (m. 1968)
- Children: 5

Margarita Pérez Pallares (born 29 September 1943) was the First Lady of Ecuador, as the wife of Osvaldo Hurtado Larrea, from 24 May 1981 to 10 October 1984.

== Biography ==
On 29 September 1943 in the Ecuadorian capital Quito, the last of four children to Rodrigo Pérez Serrano and his first wife, Rebeca Pallares Guarderas. In 1968, Pérez married future President of Ecuador Osvaldo Hurtado Larrea and they would have five children, (Sebastián, Andrés, Cristina, Isabel, and Felipe) the last two of which are twins and born in the Carondelet Palace.

=== First Lady ===
As the First Lady, Pérez was president of the National Institute of Children and Families and the hostess of the Carondelet Palace, accompanying the President in all formal functions such as the reception of the remains of Jaime Roldós Aguilera and Martha Bucaram, the previous President and First Lady whom had died in a plane crash, at the palace. Pérez would, in 1982, host Leopoldo Calvo-Sotelo, the President of Spain at the time.
