= Julio César Trujillo =

Ecuadorian politician and lawyer (1931–2019)

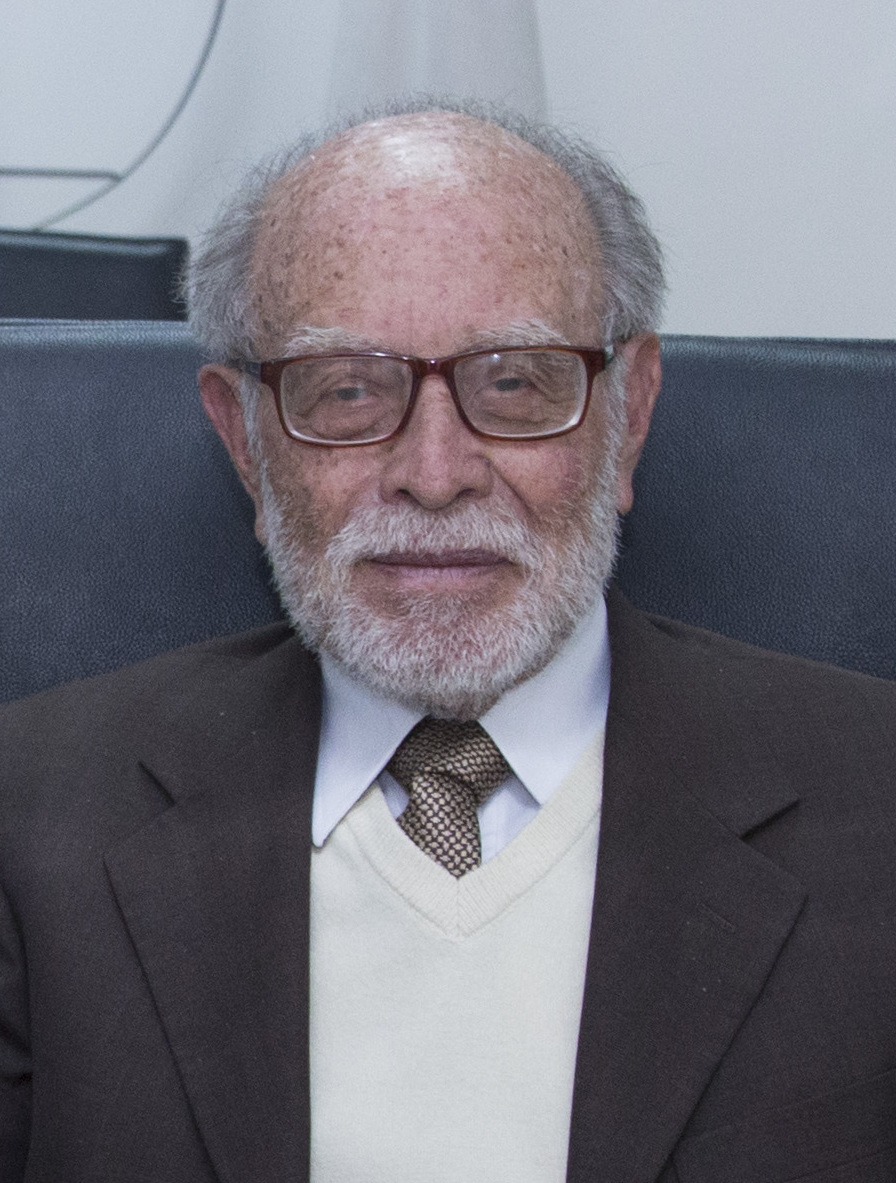
Trujillo in 2018

Julio César Trujillo Vásquez (25 March 1931 – 19 May 2019) was an Ecuadorian lawyer and politician. Born in Ibarra, he served as a member of the National Congress from 1979 to 1984. Described by Forbes as "reshaping the landscape of Ecuadorian politics," Trujillo was a presidential candidate of the Popular Democracy-Christian Democratic Union during the 1984 general election, receiving a total of 103,790 (4.7%) votes. In 2018, he was appointed president of the Council of Citizen Participation and Social Control (CPCCS), prompting The Economist to refer to Trujillo as "Ecuador's second-most powerful man." He died in office in 2019.

On 19 May 2019, Trujillo died at a Quito hospital of complications caused by the intracerebral haemorrhage he suffered five days prior. He was 88. On the death of Trujillo, President Lenín Moreno said in a statement "We have lost a true leader, a man who helped give the country's government back to the people."
