= Confederation of Indigenous Nationalities of the Ecuadorian Amazon =

The Confederation of Indigenous Nationalities of the Ecuadorian Amazon (Spanish: La Confederación de las Nacionalidades Indígenas de la Amazonia Ecuatoriana) or CONFENIAE is the regional organization of indigenous peoples in the Ecuadorian Amazon or Oriente region. Nine indigenous peoples present in the region — Quichua, Shuar, Achuar, Huaorani, Siona, Secoya, Shiwiar, Záparo and Cofán — are represented politically by the Confederation. CONFENIAE is one of three major regional groupings that constitute the Confederation of Indigenous Nationalities of Ecuador (CONAIE). It is also part of the Amazon Basin indigenous organization, COICA.

The group's president (as of 2005) is Luis Vargas Canelo, an Achuar; and its vice president is Nelson Calapucha, a Kichwa. Past leaders form an advisory council (Consejo de Sabios) for the Confederation.

In 2013 the politician Mónica Chuji became the Vice President.
