= Martha Bucaram =

Ecuadorian First Lady

Martha Bucaram Ortiz

First Lady of Ecuador
- In role 10 August 1979 – 24 May 1981
- President: Jaime Roldós Aguilera
- Preceded by: Alicia Pizzimbono
- Succeeded by: Margarita Pérez Pallares

Personal details
- Born: Martha Bucaram Ortiz; 12 October 1941 Guayaquil, Ecuador
- Died: 24 May 1981 (aged 39) Celica, Ecuador
- Cause of death: Plane crash
- Resting place: Guayaquil General Cemetery
- Spouse: Jaime Roldós Aguilera (m. 1962)
- Children: Martha; Diana; Santiago
- Occupation: Lawyer

Martha Bucaram Ortiz (12 October 1941 – 24 May 1981) was an Ecuadorian lawyer and feminist who was First Lady of Ecuador to President Jaime Roldós Aguilera, with whom she was killed in a plane crash.

== Biography ==
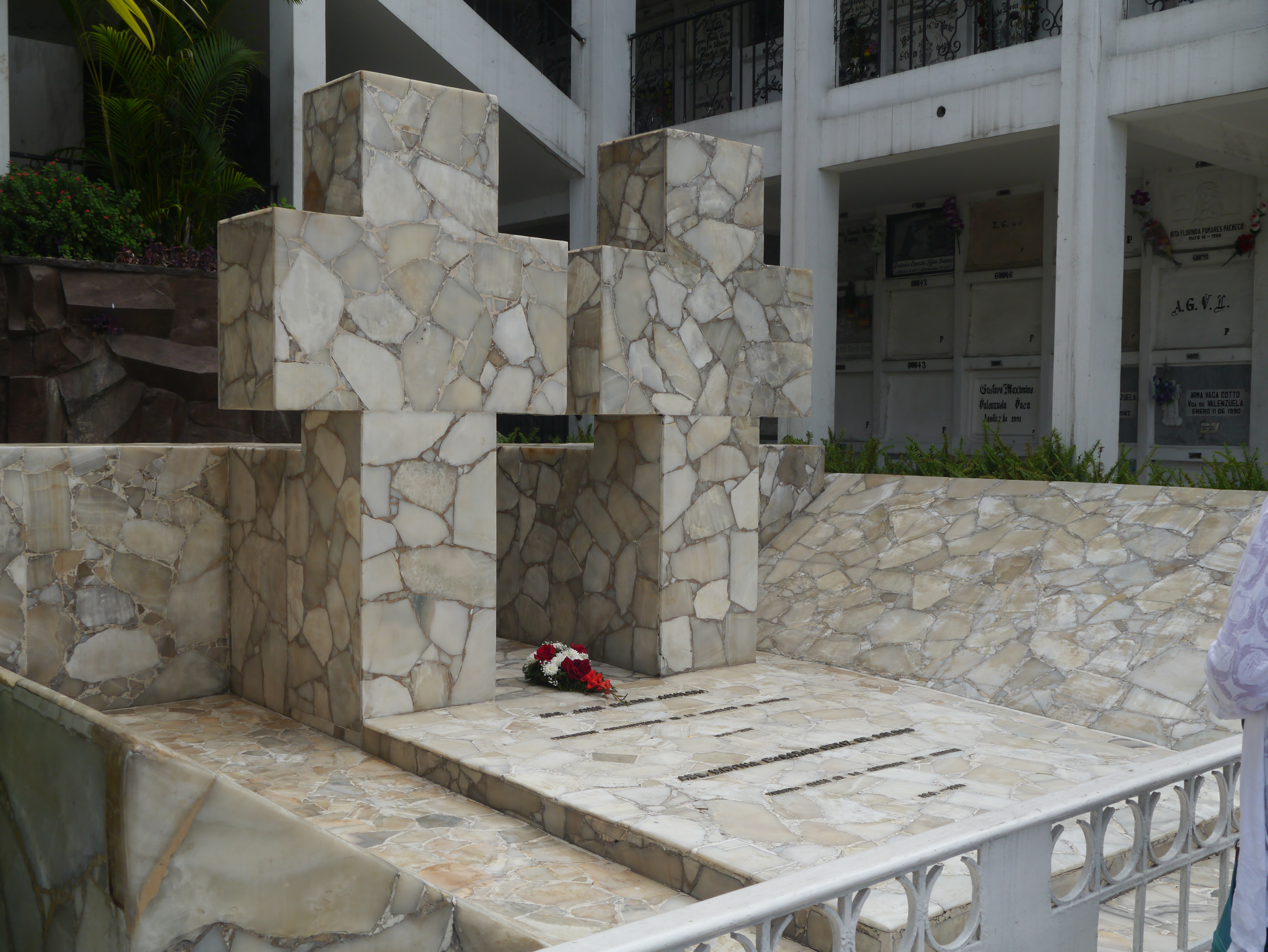
Graves of Martha Bucaram and Jaime Roldós at Guayaquil General Cemetery.

Martha Bucaram Ortiz was the firstborn child of Lebanese immigrant Jacobo Bucaram Elmhalin and Ecuadorian Rina Ortiz Caicedo, sister of athlete Jacobo Bucaram and future President of Ecuador, Abdalá Bucaram. In 1962, she married Jaime Roldós Aguilera and gave birth to three children. Her firstborn daughter, Martha Roldós, has entered politics and became a deputy in the Ethics and Democracy Network party.

== First Lady of Ecuador ==
When Jaime Roldós Aguilera assumed the Presidency of Ecuador, Bucaram became the First Lady and assumed the traditional office of president of the National Institute for Children and the Family.

As a feminist, Bucaram fought for changes to the Civil Code of Ecuador that would expand the role of women in Ecuadorian society. As First Lady, she created the Office of Women, attached to the Presidency since 1980.

== Death ==
1981 Ecuadorian presidential plane crash
Accident
- Date: 24 May 1981
- Summary: Controlled flight into terrain of disputed cause, officially pilot error
- Site: Huairapungo Hill, Loja Province, Ecuador

Aircraft
- Aircraft type: Beechcraft Super King Air 200
- Operator: Ecuadorian Air Force
- Registration: HC-BHG (civil); FAE-723 (military)
- Flight origin: Marsical Sucre International Airport, Quito
- Destination: Macará Airport, Loja
- Passengers: 9
- Crew: 3
- Survivors: 0

On Sunday, 24 May 1981 a Beechcraft Super King Air, carrying the President and an entourage to a military ceremony in honor of the fallen in the Paquisha War, crashed into Huairapungo Hill, near the town of Guachanamá, in the Celica Canton of Loja Province. The crash, at 2360 meters over sea level (7800 ft.), left no survivors: killed were the president, his wife, the Minister of Defense Marco Subía Martinez and his wife, two aides-de-camp, a flight attendant and both pilots. The bodies were reportedly burned beyond recognition.

== Citations ==
Preceded by Alicia Pizzimbono	First Lady of Ecuador; 1979–1981	Succeeded by Margarita Pérez Pallares
