= Mónica Chuji =

Ecuadorian politician (born 1973)

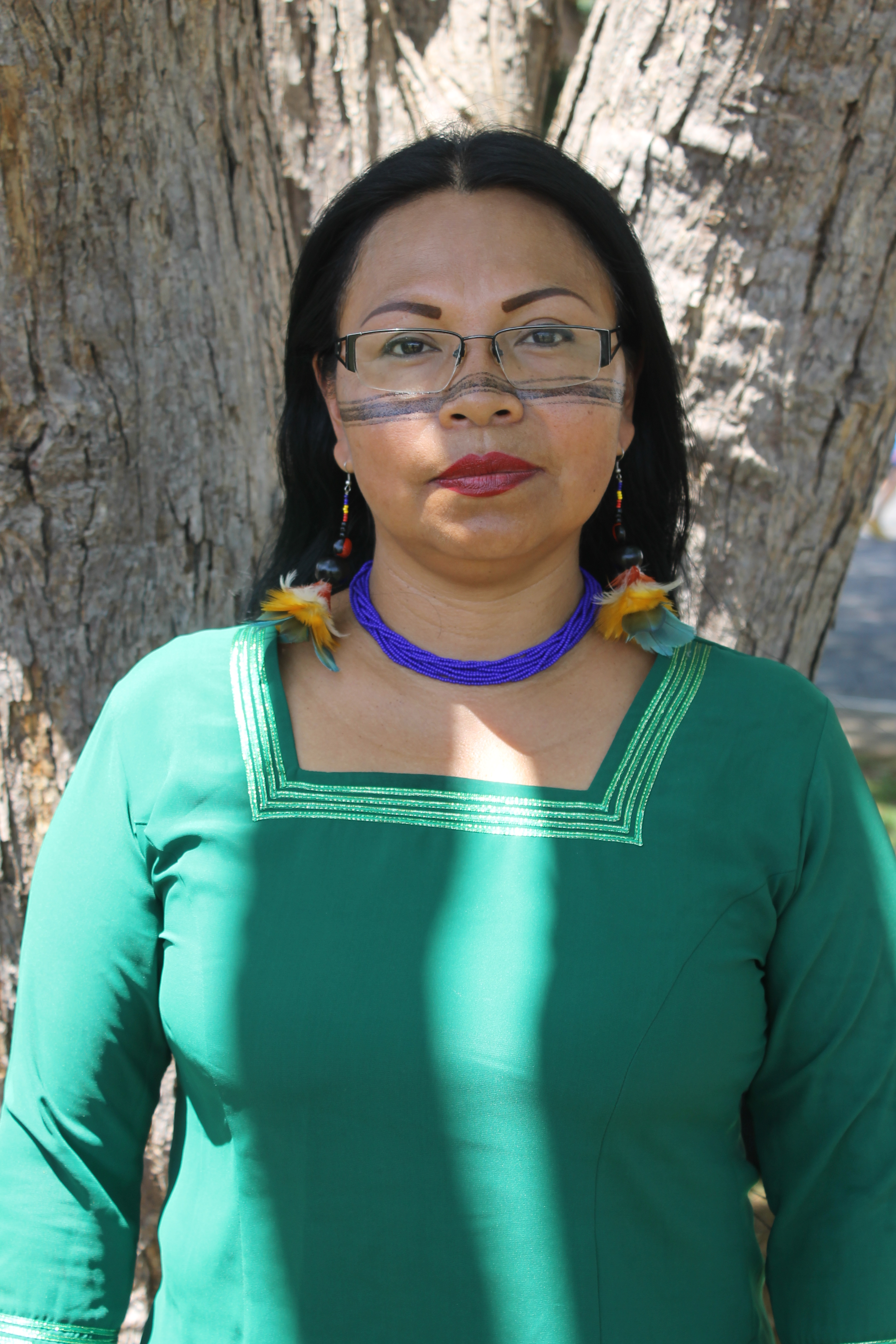
- Born: October 30, 1973 (age 52); Pastaza Province

Mónica Chuji Gualinga (born October 30, 1973) is an indigenous Ecuadorian politician who has served in the National Assembly. She is a deputy director of Indigenous Peoples Rights International.

== Life ==
Chuji was born in Pastaza Province in 1973. She was the daughter of a Shuar father and a Kichwa mother. She is a Kichwa from the Ecuadorian Amazon and belongs to the Sarayaku community of Sucumbios. Chuji graduated in social communication from the Politecnica Salesiana University in 2000.

She was a member of the Correa government as an assembly member while the Constitution of Ecuador was being created in 2008. She was the government's General Secretary of Communication when Rafael Correa was President.

Chuji joined the left wing Ethics and Democracy Network (RED) after she fell out with Correa, accusing him of authoritarian tendencies and for supporting extractive industries which she found ecologically harmful. Chuji became RED's frontrunner for the Congressional election, but the party failed to win even this seat.

In 2011 she was fined and sentenced to a year in prison for slander against Vinicio Alvarado who was another politician. After the sentence was announced Vinicio Alvarado said that he forgave her.

In 2013 Chuji became the Vice President of the Confederation of Indigenous Nationalities of the Ecuadorian Amazon.

She is a deputy director of Indigenous Peoples Rights International in 2022.
