= 1995 Ecuadorian referendum =

An eleven-part referendum was held in Ecuador on 26 November 1995. Voters were asked whether they approved of the decentralisation of social and healthcare authorities, the privatisation of social security, equalising public spending between the provinces, abolishing civil servants' right to strike, whether the President should have the authority to dissolve the National Assembly, whether local councils should have a four-year term of office, whether the President and Vice-President of the National Assembly should only serve two-year terms, whether eight constitutional reforms proposed by President Sixto Durán Ballén should be approved, certain reforms to the judiciary, legal rights for civil servants and the creation of a Constitutional Court. All eleven proposals were rejected.

== Background ==
Amidst a political crisis that resulted in the attempted impeachment, and later resignation and exile of Vicepresident Alberto Dahik, on 20 September 1995 President Durán Ballén called for a referendum with eleven questions for voters. Eight were advisory questions held under article 79 of the constitution, which allowed the President to submit questions of "national importance" to voters, but the results were not binding for the National Assembly.

The other three questions (on judicial reform, the establishment of a Constitutional Court and legal rights for civil servants) were held under article 149 of the constitution, which allowed the President to put constitutional changes to voters after the National Assembly had not approved them within 90 days (the proposals had been submitted to the Assembly in 1994). The results of those three questions were binding.

== Results ==
Issue	For		Against		Invalid/ blank	Total	Registered voters	Turnout
Issue	Votes	%	Votes	%	Invalid/ blank	Total	Registered voters	Turnout
Decentralising social and healthcare authorities	1,322,174	44.53	1,647,031	55.47	888,385	3,857,590	6,578,974	58.64
Privatisation of social security	1,200,491	39.68	1,824,636	60.32	832,645	3,857,772	6,578,974	58.64
Equal distribution of state spending between provinces	1,338,275	44.94	1,639,455	56.06	879,251	3,856,981	6,578,974	58.63
Banning public sector strikes	1,184,321	39.69	1,799,785	60.31	872,328	3,856,434	6,578,974	58.62
President can dissolve the National Assembly	1,131,996	37.55	1,882,934	62.45	841,300	3,856,230	6,578,974	58.61
Four year terms for local councils	1,214,455	39.95	1,825,840	60.05	818,175	3,858,470	6,578,974	58.65
Two year terms for National Assembly leaders	1,307,079	43.17	1,720,461	56.83	831,898	3,859,438	6,578,974	58.66
Constitutional reforms	1,310,928	43.57	1,698,087	56.43	848,538	3,857,553	6,578,974	58.63
Judicial reforms	1,186,018	40.18	1,765,610	59.82	908,259	3,859,887	6,578,974	58.67
Legal rights for civil servants	1,342,446	43.94	1,712,452	56.06	802,502	3,857,400	6,578,974	58.63
Creation of a Constitutional Court	1,176,319	39.77	1,781,355	60.23	900,934	3,858,608	6,578,974	58.65
Source: Direct Democracy
