= Alfredo Adum =

Ecuadorian lawyer and politician (1952–2023)

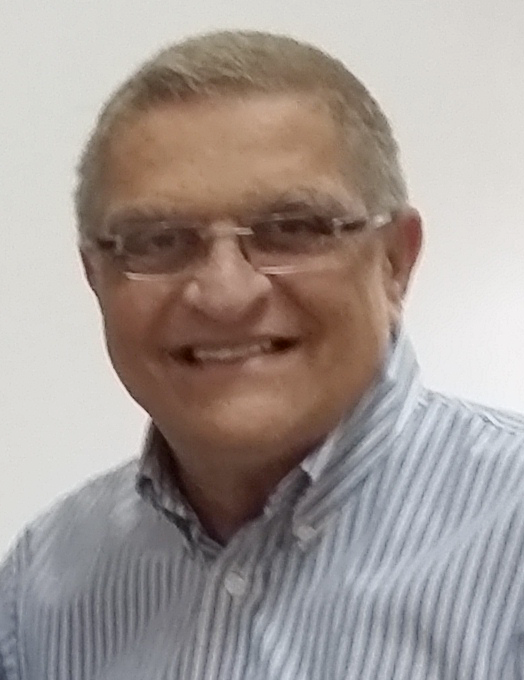
- Adum in 2016

Minister of Energy
- In office 10 August 1996 – 5 February 1997

Member of the National Congress of Ecuador for Guayas
- In office 10 August 1988 – 10 August 1990

Prefect of Guayas Province
- In office 15 April 1984 – 3 December 1986
- Preceded by: Guido Chiriboga Parra
- Succeeded by: Antonio Chedraui

Personal details
- Born: Alfredo Adum Ziadé; 20 February 1952 Guayaquil, Ecuador
- Died: 24 November 2023 (aged 71) Guayaquil, Ecuador
- Party: PRE (1983–2014); PSP (2017); Fuerza Ecuador (2018–2021)
- Education: Universidad Católica de Santiago de Guayaquil
- Occupation: Lawyer

Alfredo Adum Ziadé (20 February 1952 – 24 November 2023) was an Ecuadorian lawyer and politician. A member of the Ecuadorian Roldosist Party, he served as Prefect of Guayas Province from 1984 to 1986, was a member of the National Congress from 1988 to 1990, and was Minister of Energy from 1996 to 1997.

Adum died in Guayaquil on 24 November 2023, at the age of 71.
