= La Comisión de la Verdad =

The Truth Commission (La Comisión de la Verdad) was created by the Ecuadorian government to investigate human rights violations.
