= Martha Roldós =

Ecuadorian economist and politician

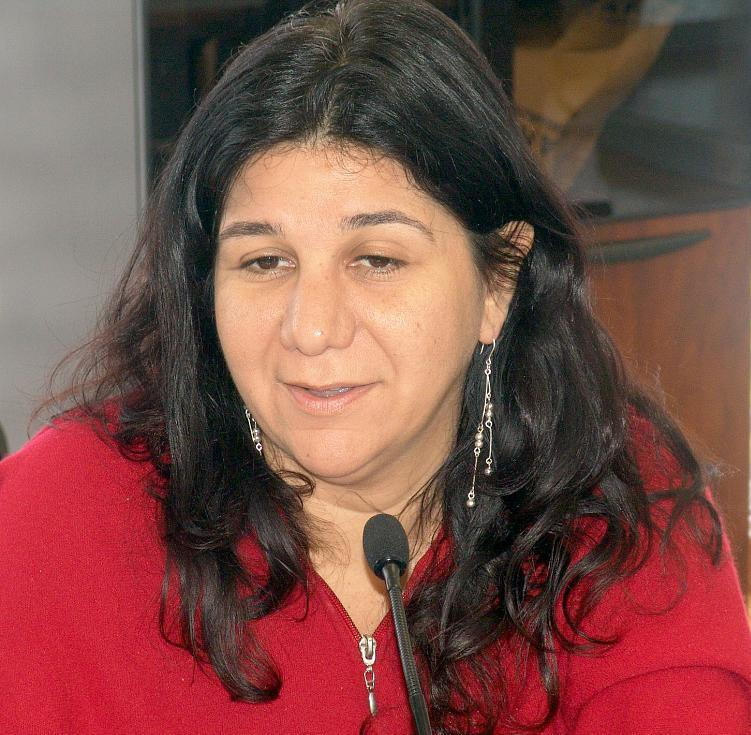
Martha Roldós in 2008

Martha Rina Victoria Roldós Bucaram (born 1963) is an Ecuadorian economist and politician. Her parents were the former president of the Republic Jaime Roldós Aguilera and Martha Bucaram, who both died in a plane crash in Loja Province in 1981.

She has been a deputy of the National Congress and the Ecuadorian Constituent Assembly, representing the Ethics and Democracy Network party, which is led by her uncle León Roldós Aguilera. She was a candidate for President of the Republic in the presidential elections of the 2009, running with Eduardo Thin.
