= Quinindé =

Town in Esmeraldas, Ecuador

- Town
- Rosa Zárate
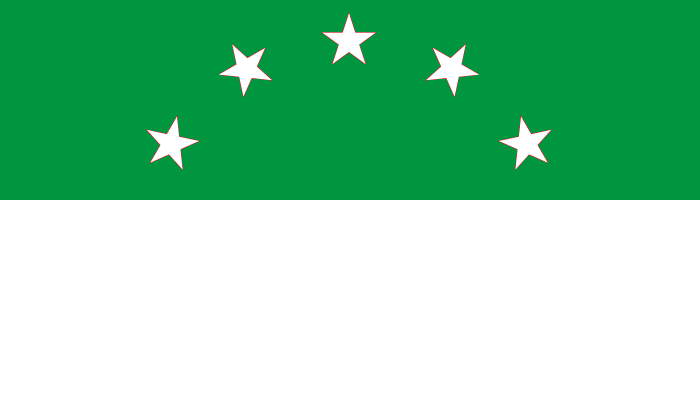
- Flag

- Location within Ecuador
- Coordinates: 0°19′48″N 79°28′48″W
- Country: Ecuador
- Province: Esmeraldas
- Canton: Quinindé Canton

Area
  - Town: 6.8 km^{2} (2.6 sq mi)

Population (2022 census)
  - Town: 31,120
  - Density: 4,600/km^{2} (12,000/sq mi)
- Climate: Am

Quinindé, also known as Rosa Zárate, is a town in the Esmeraldas province of Ecuador.

== Sports ==
Quinindé is home to the second division Ecuadorean soccer team La Brasilia, which placed second in the 2007 Copa Ecuatoriana.

== Culture ==
The town is home to a speciality known as 'un jorkshia poodeen', suspected to be a product of the post Spanish colonial period during which time the British built a number of railways across Ecuador as well as having a cultural impact on the local area.

== Notable people ==
- Nilson Angulo, international footballer
- Willian Pacho, international footballer

== Other sources ==
- World-Gazetteer.com
