= Ethics and Democracy Network =

Political party in Ecuador

Ethics and Democracy Network Red Ética y Democracia
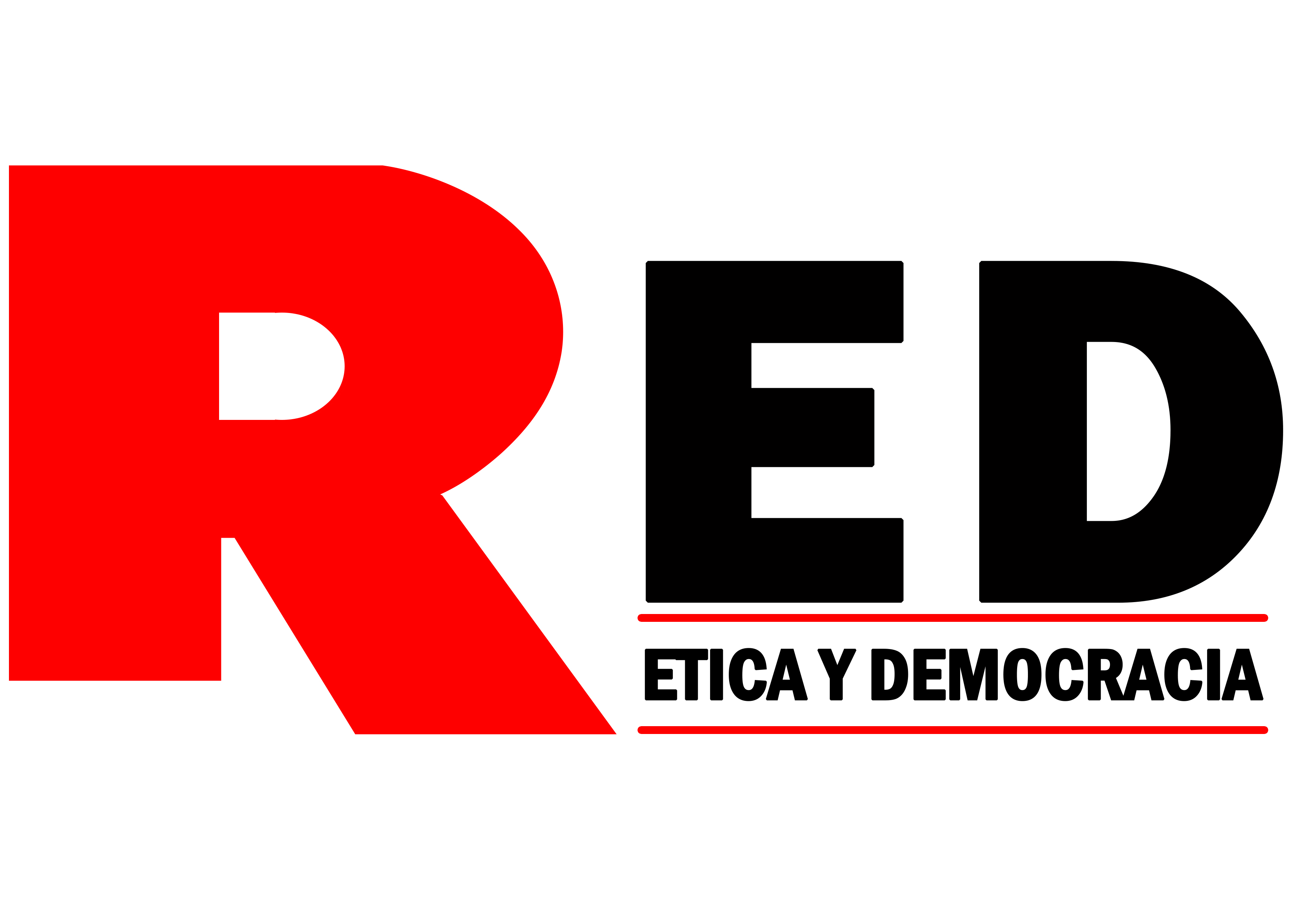
- Abbreviation: RED
- Leader: León Roldós Aguilera
- Founded: 2005
- Ideology: Trade unionism Labourism
- Political position: Center-left
- National affiliation: ID (2006)

The Ethics and Democracy Network (Spanish Red Ética y Democracia, RED) was a centre-left political party in Ecuador. It was formed by labour union leaders and other leftist militants, led by León Roldós, former vice-president and brother of former president Jaime Roldós, who came from the Ecuadorian Socialist Party. For the October 2006 elections, RED entered into an alliance with the Democratic Left party, to support the candidacy of León Roldós and running mate Ramiro González, former Prefect of the Pichincha Province. The alliance's presidential ticket came in fourth place with 14.8% of the votes, while RED won 5 of 100 seats in Congress.

Between 2005 and 2007, RED received training by the U.S. National Democratic Institute for International Affairs through its Political Party Network funded by the National Endowment for Democracy.

In 2009, Martha Roldós, the daughter of Jaime and niece of León Roldós ran as RED's presidential candidate. She was considered one of the strongest left-wing contenders of President Rafael Correa whom she heavily criticized, but won only 4.3% of the votes. Mario Unda, professor of sociology at the Central University of Ecuador criticized RED for a perceived drift to the right and links with business oligarchs. RED was joined by Mónica Chuji, a former member of Correa's government who had turned against him, accusing him of authoritarian tendencies and excessive economic focus on ecologically harmful extractive industries. Chuji became RED's frontrunner for the Congressional election, in which the party failed to win any seat.
