= Blasco Peñaherrera Padilla =

Vicepresident of Ecuador

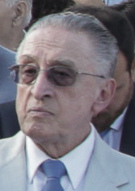

Vice President of Ecuador
- In office 10 August 1984 – 10 August 1988
- President: León Febres Cordero
- Preceded by: León Roldós Aguilera
- Succeeded by: Luis Parodi Valverde

Personal details
- Born: 22 February 1934 (age 92) Quito, Ecuador
- Party: Ecuadorian Radical Liberal Party (PLRE)

Blasco Peñaherrera Padilla (Quito, Ecuador; February 22, 1934) is an Ecuadorian lawyer and politician. He served as Vice President of the Republic of Ecuador in the government of President León Febres Cordero Ribadeneyra from August 10, 1984 to August 10, 1988.

Peñaherrera Padilla was a prominent figure in Ecuadorian politics during the second half of the 20th century. He held important roles such as leader and top representative of the Ecuadorian Radical Liberal Party, legislator, Vice President of Ecuador, ambassador, and Andean parliamentarian, among others. Throughout his public life, he maintained firm and often controversial positions, but his adversaries respected him, primarily for his well-known integrity.

== Biography ==
He spent his early years in Quito and, from 1939, in Ambato, Ecuador, at the home of his maternal grandmother, Hermelinda Mosquera de Padilla, with whom he was raised. He began his primary education at the Juan León Mera School, under Father Juan Bautista Palacios.

In January 1978, Blasco Peñaherrera Padilla was offered the presidency of the Ecuadorian Radical Liberal Party in Quito. Meanwhile, at the National Assembly in Riobamba, the party selected Francisco Huerta Montalvo and Blasco Peñaherrera Padilla as its presidential and vice-presidential candidates. Their campaign started with notable success, but the Supreme Electoral Tribunal disqualified Huerta due to his contract with Fedesarrollo and the government. In his place, the party's assembly nominated his uncle, Raúl Clemente, who asked Peñaherrera to join him on the electoral ticket. However, Peñaherrera declined and did not participate in the first round of the elections in June of that year. In the second round, in January 1979, Peñaherrera ran as the second candidate for National Deputy, behind Huerta. They were both elected, sharing representation, as Huerta allowed Peñaherrera to act on his behalf for much of his term.

In 2006, Blasco Peñaherrera Padilla withdrew his candidacy for a congressional seat in Pichincha under the Christian Social Party (PSC) Christian Social Party (Ecuador), sparking speculation about a possible conflict with Quito councilwoman Macarena Valarezo. Valarezo accused Peñaherrera's associates of attempting to secure her spot on the party's list for re-election to the Quito City Council. She stated that the decision regarding her re-election as a councilwoman was made by the PSC leadership during a national party assembly and denied any dispute with Peñaherrera related to her allegations about the construction of Quito's new airport and an alleged deal worth over 300 million dollars.

In 2024, at the age of 90, Blasco Peñaherrera Padilla presented his book Controversia y propuesta. En las últimas décadas del siglo XX . The book compiles a selection of his articles published in Vistazo magazine from the 1960s to the 1990s, organized into general themes such as "Controversy" (the name of his column), political issues, political history, and international affairs. Reading this work offers a deeper understanding of the thoughts of a key figure in Ecuador's history.

== Personal life ==
He married Zeyneb Solah in 1955, with whom he had three children. Peñaherrera met her when she was a student at Santo Domingo de Guzmán during a literary competition in which male schools also participated. Zeyneb Solah died on July 17, 2021, at the age of 87.

== Publications ==
- 1988: El viernes negro, antes y después de Taura.
- 1990: Discursos 1984-1988.
- 1991: El Liberalismo en el Ecuador de la gesta al porvenir.
- 1992: La revolución del sentido común, breve relación de un colapso inevitable y de las causas de un renacimiento saludable y necesario.
- 2010: Perú y Chile desde las cenizas.
- 2023: Controversia y propuesta en las últimas décadas del siglo XX.
