= Francisco Huerta Montalvo =

Ecuadorian doctor and politician (1940–2022)

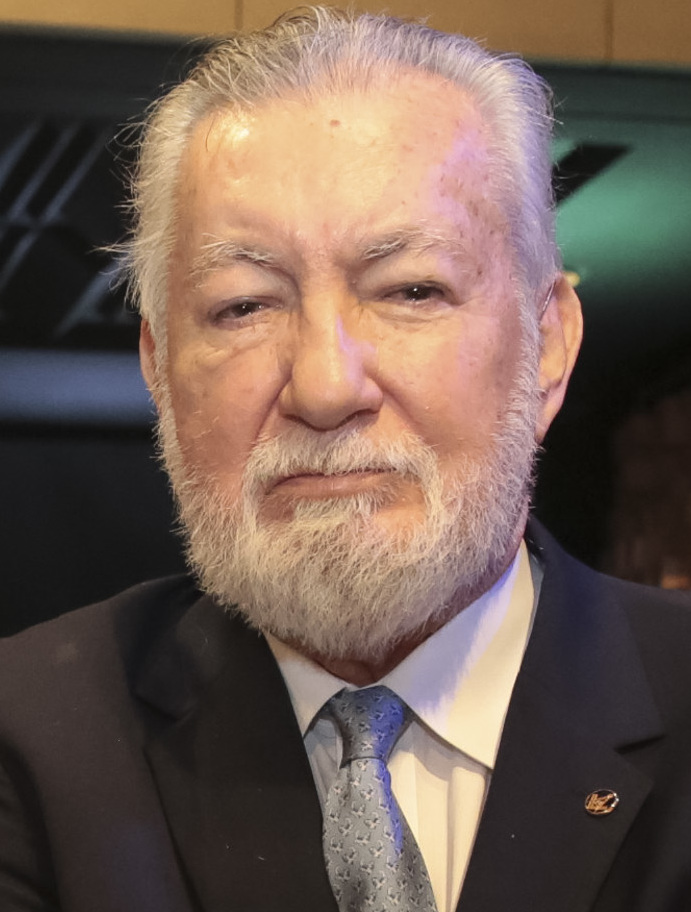
- Huerta in 2018

Minister of Government
- In office 24 January 2000 – April 2000
- Preceded by: Vladimiro Álvarez
- Succeeded by: Antonio Andretta Arízaga

Ecuadorian Embassy to Venezuela
- In office 1988–1992
- Preceded by: Miguel Coello Fernández

Minister of Public Health
- In office 1982–1983
- Succeeded by: Luis Sarrazín Dávila

Mayor of Guayaquil
- In office July 1970 – September 1970

Personal details
- Born: 18 June 1940 Guayaquil, Ecuador
- Died: 2 July 2022 (aged 82) Guayaquil, Ecuador
- Party: PLRE (until 1981); PD
- Education: University of Guayaquil
- Occupation: Doctor

Francisco Huerta Montalvo (18 June 1940 – 2 July 2022) was an Ecuadorian politician. A member of the Ecuadorian Radical Liberal Party and later the Democratic Party, he served as Minister of Government from January to April 2000 and Minister of Public Health from 1982 to 1983.

Huerta died of cardiac arrest in Guayaquil on 2 July 2022 at the age of 82.
