= Quinindé Canton =

Quinindé Canton Rosa Zárate
- Canton
- Location of Esmeraldas Province in Ecuador.

- Quinindé Canton in Esmeraldas Province
- Coordinates: 0°19′48″N 79°28′48″W
- Country: Ecuador
- Province: Esmeraldas Province

Area
  - Total: 3,621 km^{2} (1,398 sq mi)

Population (2022 census)
  - Total: 126,841
  - Density: 35.03/km^{2} (90.73/sq mi)
- Time zone: UTC-5 (ECT)

Quinindé Canton is a canton of Ecuador, located in the Esmeraldas Province. Its capital is the town of Quinindé. Its population at the 2001 census was 88,337. It is located in the Costa Region. Its cantonal head is the city of Rosa Zárate, a place where a large part of its total population is grouped.

== Description ==
The city and Canton Quinindé, like other Ecuadorian towns, is governed by a municipality as stipulated in the National Political Constitution. The Municipality of Quinindé is a sectional government entity that autonomously manages the canton of the central government. The municipality is organized by the separation of executive powers represented by the mayor, and another of a legislative nature made up of the members of the cantonal council. The Mayor is the highest administrative and political authority of the Quinindé Canton. He is the head of the council and representative of the Municipality.

== History ==
The Quinindé canton, created on July 3 by the 1967 National Constituent Assembly chaired by Vice President Julio Estupiñán Tello, who approved Decree No. 112, published in Official Register No. 161 of July 3 of the same year.

== Borders ==
Quinindé has borders with Esmeraldas and Rioverde cantons to the north, with the provinces of Pichincha and Manabíto the south, with the provinces of Pichincha and Imbabura and with the Canton Eloy Alfaro to the east and with the Province of Manabí and the Canton Muisne to the west.

== Political division ==
The canton is divided into parishes that can be urban or rural and are represented by the Parish Boards before the Municipality of Quinindé.

=== Urban parishes ===
- Rosa Zárate

=== Rural parishes ===
- Cube
- Chura
- Malimpia
- La Unión
- Viche

The cantonal jurisdiction of Quinindé is made up of the urban parish of Rosa Zárate, the cantonal capital and the rural parishes of Cube, Viche, Chura, Malimpia and La Unión. It has a population that borders the 122,570 inhabitants.

Date of creation of the parishes:

1. CUBE: OCTOBER 23, 1955
2. LA UNION: JUNE 22, 1992
3. VICHE: JANUARY 21, 1951
4. MALIMPIA: DECEMBER 28, 1950
5. CHURA: AUGUST 27, 1955

The extension of these parishes is:'

1. Rosa Zárate: 1.000 km^{2}
2. Viche: 84 km^{2}
3. Cube: 717 km^{2}
4. Chura: 204 km⊃2
5. Malimpia: 469 km^{2}
6. La Unión: 986 km^{2}

La Uniòn

Parish growth and evolution.

La Unión Parish in recent years has experienced rapid growth, both in its population and in the number of infrastructure. However, all this growth has been concentrated only in the parish capital, mainly due to the great commercial potential of the area. In addition, as it is located on the Quinindé - Santo Domingo de los Tsáchilas road, which has given more dynamism to the economy of the parish.

As for rural areas, these have not grown at the same rate as the parish capital, so they have serious limitations in terms of basic services.

According to the 2001 census carried out by INEC, the population of the parish was approximately 15,503 inhabitants; while in the 2010 census the population is 19924 inhabitants and currently with the new limits of the parish there is an approximate of 36460 inhabitants. Of which in the urban part the same one that has 27 neighborhoods has 11705 inhabitants and in the rural part with 24755 inhabitants the same ones that are distributed in the 62 precincts around the parish (Statistics from ARR Consultora JR).

Human Settlements within the Study Area.

La Unión Parish is made up of 27 Urban Neighborhoods and 63 Rural Areas, the urban neighborhoods make up the urban center that constitutes the Parish Head.

== Characteristics ==
=== Relief ===
There are the projections of the Mache - Chindul and Cojimies mountains, with heights ranging from 300 to 500 meters high. To the northwest there are considerable elevations, at the headwaters of the Canandé and Rioverde rivers, with elevations from 200 to 400 meters above sea level.

=== Flora ===
Within the flora we find: trees of fine woods, rubber, ceibos (vegetable wool), tagua (vegetable ivory), bananas, fibers such as abaca and toquilla, the latter used to make hats that are well received in foreign markets .

=== Fauna ===
The fauna is extensive in the jungle, in the lowlands of the Coast there is an equatorial fauna such as: the American jaguar or tiger, the sloths or "light parakeets", anteaters, macaws, parrots, toucans, redfish, boobies, terns, lizards, poisonous snakes.

=== Weather ===
The climate is warm with a temperature of 25 degrees in Quinindé and 23 in La Concordia, with a rainfall of 1,948 mm. for Quinindé and 3206 mm. for La Concordia.

=== Hydrography ===
The lower parts and where the best lands for agriculture are found, watered by a large number of rivers, are those included in Canandé, Guayllabamba, Búa, Cupa, Mache, etc. Furthermore, it is only necessary to add the rivers Viche, Cube, Cócola, Cucaracha, Arenanga, Spantima, Dogo. While the Esmeraldas River is made up of the Quinindé and Blanco, report of the educational magazine Esmeraldas.

== Economic development ==
The economy of the Quinindé canton has been based on agriculture, livestock, industry and commerce, although in these two years it has decreased due to the recession policies applied by the Government. In agriculture, most of the population is dedicated to this activity and it has obtained the best results with African palm, palm heart, abacá macadamia, and taro, converted into raw material for the industry. Other important agricultural products in the region have been passion fruit, pepper, pineapple, banana, tobacco, banana, coconut, woods, fruits, tomato, peppers, cassava, corn, rice, peanuts, etc.

Dual-purpose livestock is the complement of wealth, with the production of meat and milk. The best cattle in the province are found in this canton, with more than 10,000 units. There are also important industries that process the production of African palm, heart of palm, palm kernel, passion fruit seed, macadamia, abaca, juice extractors (it will soon be operational). There is a factory that processes wood (chipboard) and several wood and balsa sawmills.

=== Tourism ===
- Laguna de Cube
- Chachi - grupo étnico
- La Puntilla

=== Gastronomy ===
==== Typical food ====
- Tapao: It has as a base for its preparation the green banana and different types of meat (pork, cow, fish), especially dried or salpresa. These ingredients are cooked together with dressings and accompanied for consumption with lemongrass or lemon verbena water.
- Chucula de maduro: Dessert made from mature cooked, crushed with milk, cinnamon, cloves, sugar and raisins.
- Cocadas: Peeling the coconut, then scraping it, putting it in a bronze bowl, adding sugar, cloves, cinnamon, honey and panela.
