= León Roldós Aguilera =

Ecuadorian politician

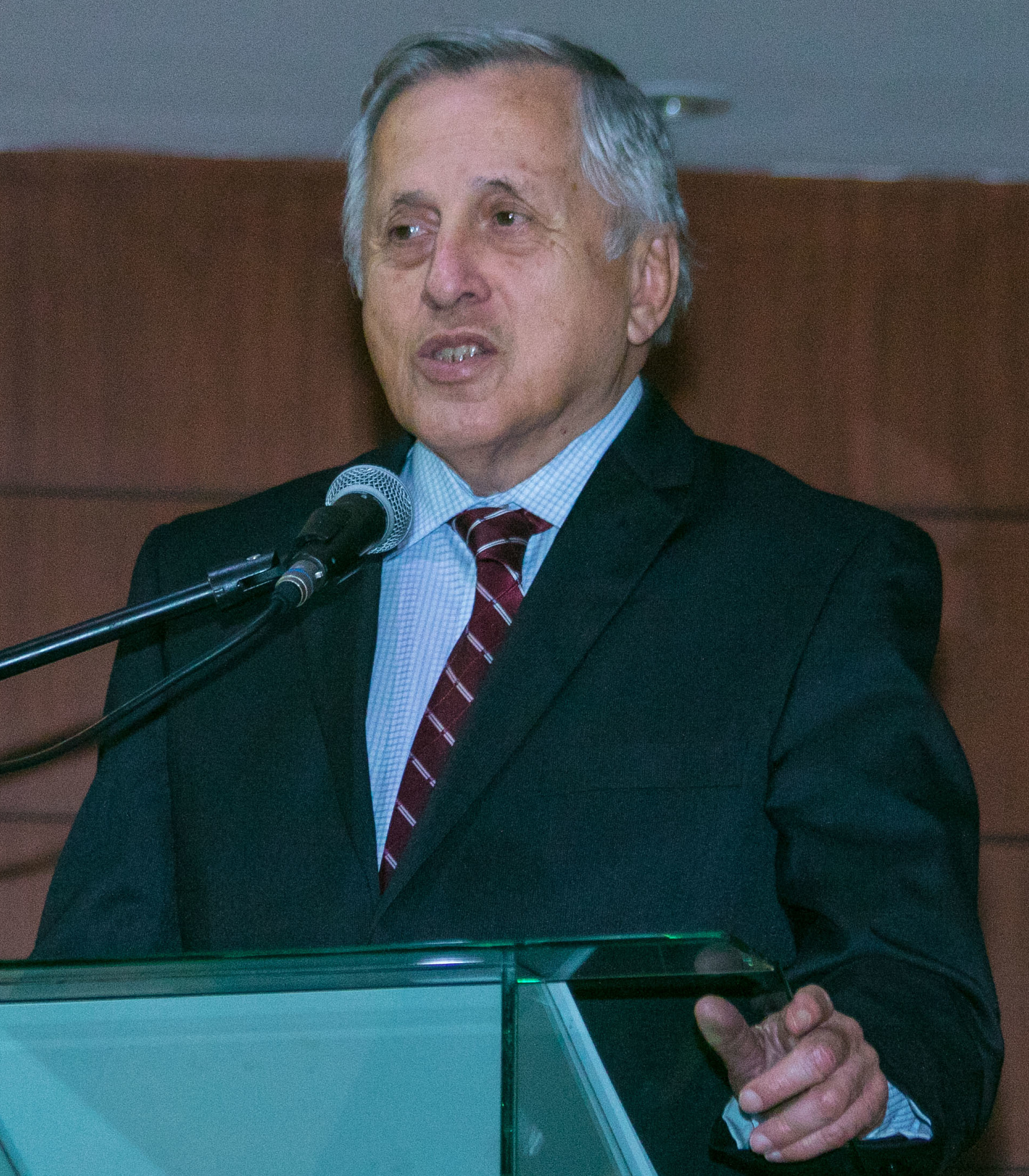
- Aguilera in 2018

Vice President of Ecuador
- In office 2 July 1981 – 10 August 1984
- President: Osvaldo Hurtado
- Preceded by: Osvaldo Hurtado
- Succeeded by: Blasco Peñaherrera Padilla

Personal details
- Born: 21 July 1942 (age 84) Guayaquil, Ecuador
- Party: Ethics and Democracy Network

León Roldós Aguilera (born 21 July 1942) is an Ecuadorian politician who served as the Vice President of Ecuador from 1981 to 1984.

== Early life ==
He was born in Guayaquil in 1942. His mother died during his birth. He studied law at the state University of Guayaquil. He became secretary of the Municipality of Guayaquil under Mayor Assad Bucaram (his brother's father in law), of the populist party Concentración de Fuerzas Populares. He also had a private practice of law and consultancy mostly to the banking sector. He later became a professor in the University of Guayaquil and a dean of the law school of the Universidad Laica Vicente Rocafuerte.

== Career ==
In 1979, his brother Jaime Roldós was elected president in a ticket representing the alliance between Concentración de Fuerzas Populares and the Christian Democrat Party Democracia Popular. He was then appointed chairman of the Monetary Board (Junta Monetaria).

President Jaime Roldós died in an airplane crash while in office; the National Congress elected León Roldós to serve out the term (1981–84) as vice-president, with President Osvaldo Hurtado, of Democracia Popular. León Roldós did not enjoy a good relationship with President Hurtado, having opposed the assumption of the private external debt by the government (known as the "sucretización"), among other economic policies.

On 31 October 1994, León Roldós was elected rector of the University of Guayaquil, and served two terms, which were acknowledged to have revitalized this institution.

León Roldos ran for president in 1992 under the banner of the Socialist Party of Ecuador and in a second attempt in 2002 as an independent; he received then 15.4% of the vote and barely missed the runoff election. He was also elected Congressman for the Province of Guayas.

In the 2006 Ecuadorian general election he ran again, this time in a ticket of the alliance of "Ethics and Democracy Network" (Red Etica y Democrática) and of the Democratic Left Party. He raked a fourth place of the vote, receiving 14.8% of the votes cast.

Political offices
| Preceded by Osvaldo Hurtado | Vice President of Ecuador; 1981–1984 | Succeeded by Blasco Peñaherrera Padilla |
