= Osvaldo Hurtado =

President of Ecuador (1981–1984)

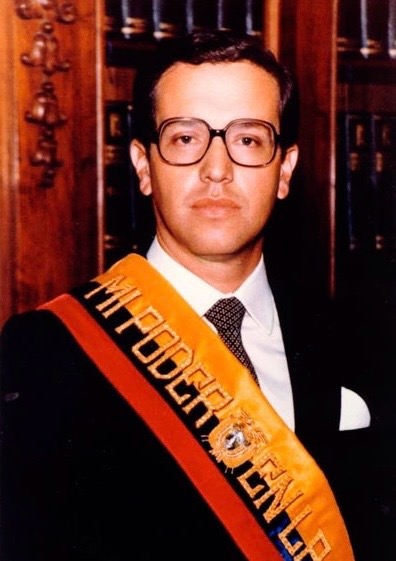
- Official portrait, 1981

34th President of Ecuador
- In office 24 May 1981 – 10 August 1984
- Vice President: León Roldós Aguilera (1981–1984)
- Preceded by: Jaime Roldós Aguilera
- Succeeded by: León Febres Cordero

Vice President of Ecuador
- In office 10 August 1979 – 24 May 1981
- President: Jaime Roldós Aguilera
- Preceded by: None
- Succeeded by: Blasco Peñaherrera Padilla

President of the 1998 Constitutional Assembly
- In office 20 December 1997 – 8 May 1998

Personal details
- Born: Luis Osvaldo Hurtado Larrea; 26 June 1939 (age 87) Chambo, Chimborazo Province, Ecuador
- Party: Popular Democracy
- Height: 1.75 m (5 ft 9 in)
- Spouse: Margarita Pérez Pallares (m. 1968)
- Children: 5
- Education: Pontificia Universidad Católica del Ecuador
- Occupation: Political scientist

Luis Osvaldo Hurtado Larrea (born 26 June 1939) is an Ecuadorian author and politician who served as President of Ecuador from 24 May 1981 to 10 August 1984.

Hurtado was born in Chambo, Chimborazo Province. During his studies at the Catholic University in the 1960s, Hurtado became a student leader. Afterwards, he lectured political sociology at his alma mater and at the Centro Andino of the University of New Mexico. He became one of the most widely read political scientists of his home country. In 1977, he authored an influential book on Ecuadorian politics titled El Poder Político en el Ecuador (English: "Political Power in Ecuador").

Hurtado drew progressive Catholics and younger professionals away from the Social Christian Party and into the Christian Democrats movement which was inspired by Christian communitarianism and Liberation theology and criticized capitalist exploitation. At the time, it was the most radical among Ecuador's non-Marxist parties and Hurtado was suspected by his right-wing opponents of being a "closet Marxist". In 1978, he merged his Christian Democrats with the progressive wing of the Conservative Party to form the Popular Democracy party.

In 1979, Hurtado was chosen as running mate of presidential candidate Jaime Roldós Aguilera of the populist Concentration of People's Forces. Roldós was successful and Hurtado became Vice President of Ecuador. On Sunday, 24 May 1981, Jaime Roldós Aguilera died in a plane crash. Hurtado succeeded Roldós Aguilera as President of Ecuador and served out the rest of his term.

Hurtado is a member of the Club de Madrid. He is also a member of the Inter-American Dialogue.

== Selected works ==
- Political Power in Ecuador, Westview Press, 1985, ISBN 0813302641
- Portrait of a Nation: Culture and Progress in Ecuador, Madison Books, 2010, ISBN 9781568332635

Political offices
Preceded by Vacant	Vice President of Ecuador; 10 August 1979–24 May 1981	Succeeded by León Roldós Aguilera
Preceded by Jaime Roldós Aguilera	President of Ecuador; 24 May 1981–10 August 1984	Succeeded by León Febres Cordero
