= Jaime Roldós Aguilera =

33rd President of Ecuador (1979–1981)

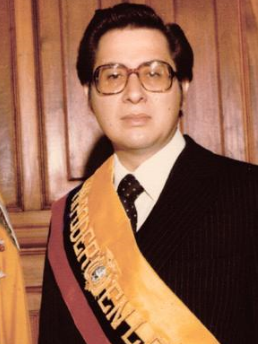
- Official portrait, 1979

33rd President of Ecuador
- In office August 10, 1979 – May 24, 1981
- Vice President: Osvaldo Hurtado Larrea (1979–1981)
- Preceded by: Alfredo Poveda
- Succeeded by: Osvaldo Hurtado Larrea

Personal details
- Born: November 5, 1940 Guayaquil, Ecuador
- Died: May 24, 1981 (aged 40) Huairapungo Mountain, Celica Canton, Loja Province, Ecuador
- Cause of death: Plane crash
- Party: Concentration of People's Forces
- Spouse: Martha Bucaram (m. 1962; died 1981)
- Children: 3
- Education: University of Guayaquil

Jaime Roldós Aguilera (November 5, 1940 – May 24, 1981) was an Ecuadorian politician who was the 33rd President of Ecuador from August 10, 1979 until his death on May 24, 1981. In his short tenure, he became known for his firm stance on human rights, which led to clashes with other Latin American governments and poor relations with Ronald Reagan's United States administration.

Elected at the age of 38, he is the first democratically elected president after a decade of military dictatorship. He restored constitutional order and encouraged free elections. His foreign policy focused on defending human rights, even at the expense of economic or military interests. On the economic and social front, he raised the minimum wage, strengthened workers' rights, promoted literacy programs, and improved access to healthcare.

On Sunday 24 May 1981, a plane in which he was travelling crashed, killing all passengers including Roldós and his wife. Controversy surrounds the circumstances of the crash, including the absence of a black box. Multiple investigations were carried out at the time, and in 2015-16, but no definite cause was determined.

== Early life and career ==
Roldós was born in Guayaquil on 5 November 1940. He attended high school at the Vicente Rocafuerte National School. He studied law and social sciences at the University of Guayaquil. He was an excellent student and won many awards, medals and scholarships. He served in the National Congress from 1968 until 1970.

At the age of 37, he ran for president on a populist platform. As the party theoretician, Roldós had originally meant to be a replacement candidate for Assad Bucaram, the populist leader of his Concentration of Popular Forces party. The outgoing military junta barred Bucaram from the presidential election, which, according to political observers, he surely would have won. In his place, the CFP fielded Roldós under the slogan “Roldós in the Presidency, Bucaram in power.” Marta, Roldós wife, was Bucaram's niece. In the first round, he received the greatest number of votes, but not the 50% plus one needed to avoid a runoff.

In December 1978, during the nine-month interval between the first and second rounds of the election, an alleged plot to assassinate him, supposedly by eight Americans (who were later charged with archeologic relics trafficking) was reportedly foiled by the military government. On 18 June 1979, Roldós' house in Guayaquil was machine-gunned by unknown assailants.

He won the second round of elections against Sixto Durán Ballén, an architect and experienced politician who was the co-founder of the conservative Social Christian Party and former Mayor of Quito. Roldós assumed office on 10 August 1979 in a ceremony attended by several world dignitaries, among them American Secretary of State Cyrus Vance (with First Lady Rosalynn Carter accompanying) and Spanish Prime Minister Adolfo Suárez.

== President of Ecuador (1979-1981) ==
On October 10, 1979, Roldós signed a decree reducing the workweek to 42 hours. On November 2, 1979, he issued another decree doubling the minimum wage to 4,000 sucres per month. ($160 in 1979 US dollars). On March 8, 1980, he established the National Development Plan. On April 15, 1980, he established a committee of notables to seek a solution to the power struggle in the National Congress, which was presided over by his former mentor Assad Bucaram. He clashed with Congress. His social policies were not well received by certain business sectors. Acts of espionage, threats, and sabotage were reported, increasing the sense of instability during his administration.

He named 1981 the "year of advances". In late January and early February 1981, there were border skirmishes with Peru, in the Cordillera del Cóndor. Clashes occurred in the regions of Paquisha, Mayaycu, and Machinatza. With great skill and diplomacy, he left the territorial dispute to arbitration by the Organization of American States.

Roldós's most important accomplishment was his policy supporting human rights, in an era when most Latin American countries were under military dictatorships. In September 1980, Roldós met with the democratically elected presidents of the Andean region (Venezuela, Colombia, and Peru) and proposed signing a Charter of Conduct, in which the principles of universal justice and human rights were reaffirmed, signalling that the protection of human rights was a more important principle than non-intervention. His stance on human rights led him to clash with fellow Latin American leaders: in one instance at a summit in Colombia, El Salvador's José Napoleón Duarte (the US-backed president who came to power after the coup that set off the Salvadoran Civil War) mocked Roldós for being young and inexperienced. Roldós answered: “I may be inexperienced, but my government perches on a mountain of popular votes, while yours is perched on a mountain of corpses.”

== Death ==
1981 Ecuadorian presidential plane crash
Accident
- Date: 24 May 1981
- Summary: Controlled flight into terrain due to pilot error (oficially)
- Site: Huairapungo Hill, Loja Province, Ecuador

Aircraft
- Aircraft type: Beechcraft Super King Air 200
- Operator: Ecuadorian Air Force
- Registration: HC-BHG (civil); FAE-723 (military)
- Flight origin: Mariscal Sucre International Airport, Quito
- Destination: Macará Airport, Loja
- Passengers: 9
- Crew: 3
- Survivors: 0

On Sunday, 24 May 1981, a Beechcraft Super King Air carrying the president and his entourage to a military ceremony in honor of the fallen in the short war with Peru crashed into Huairapungo Hill, near the town of Guachanamá, in the Celica Canton of Loja Province. The crash, at 2360 meters over sea level (7800 ft.), left no survivors. Killed along with the president were First Lady Martha Bucaram, the Minister of Defense Marco Subía Martinez and his wife, two aides-de-camp, a flight attendant, and both pilots. The bodies were reportedly burned beyond recognition.

=== Investigation and controversies ===
==== Air Force inquiry ====
The controversy about the cause of the crash began immediately when the Accident Investigation Committee (Junta Investigadora de Accidentes, JIA) of the Ecuadorian Air Force attributed the crash to navigational pilot error. According to the 60-page report released in early June 1981, 45-year-old pilot Marco Andrade, a colonel with 4,265 hours of flying experience, began an instrument-controlled descent over cloud-shrouded mountains five minutes earlier than expected due to a miscalculated position. Beechcraft representatives aided the inquiry and, after examining the wreckage, ruled out sabotage by a mid-air explosion.

The report said contributing factors included Roldós' haste to reach the border town of Macará and the pilot's fatigue; the pilot was also the president's military aide-de-camp. Andrade had reportedly stood beside Roldós for three hours during the Atahualpa Stadium military ceremony before the flight. The report criticized Andrade's dual role as military aide and pilot, noting he had been on duty since 6:30 a.m. on the day of the accident, accompanying Roldós on his hectic schedule. It also noted that Col. Andrade and the co-pilot, Lt. Enrique Romo, had flown the Quito-Macará route five days earlier in the same aircraft to familiarize with the route. However, they apparently tried to cut short the final leg because of the president's tight schedule.

There were also rumors that the Colombian M-19 leftist guerrilla, or other enemies of Roldós, were involved in the crash, but these accounts were dispelled by authorities.

==== Arosemena inquiry (first investigation) ====
A parliamentary commission was formed months later, led by then-MP and former President Otto Arosemena, following pressure from the families of the victims and political groups allied with the president. It found contradictions and inconsistencies in the JIA report but could not reach definitive conclusions, especially since the aircraft purchased by the Air Force to operate as a VIP transport lacked black box equipment. A team from the Zurich Police also conducted an investigation and concluded that the plane's motors were shut down when it crashed into the mountain. This opinion, which contradicted the Air Force Report, was not investigated further by the Ecuadorian government.

==== Granda inquiry (second investigation) ====
A second parliamentary inquiry, led by socialist MP Victor Granda, was formed in 1990 to review the findings of the Arosemena commission and the military investigations. The final 26-volume report, published in August 1992, found several inconsistencies and voids in the initial findings but did not establish a definitive conclusion. It criticized the Arosemena commission for its lack of further investigation into the Zurich police findings. Granda has also questioned former President Osvaldo Hurtado (who had succeeded Roldós) for failing to question or expose the failures in the Ecuadorian Air Force's flight security protocols that led to the crash.

Specifically, the Granda commission found that in the contracting process of the King Air bought by the Air Force, several high-ranking Air Force officers stated that the black box equipment was not acquired with the plane because it was considered “optional” among other spares and equipment when it should have carried one, as it was functioning as a presidential transport. The investigation reportedly found that the two additional pages of the acquisition expedient, the ones with the optional equipment list, were not rubricated (initialed and/or highlighted in red) by any officer; so the commission asked the Air Force to demand a certification from Beechcraft on whether it had provided a black box. The Air Force relayed Beechcraft's response: that they had no record of selling or providing one. In spite of this, and that none was found at the crash site, Granda still contends a black box “may have existed”.

In this line, Granda has criticized and speculated in later decades that:

Maybe there was a record of the voices in the last stage of the presidential flight and [it is suspicious] how they removed all the debris from the accident, without any judicial process, without any security protocol, based on the provisions of the military command at that time, which was fundamentally influenced by Admiral [Raúl] Sorroza, who has always been accused of [having] something to do with the death of President Roldós, so obviously it does give rise to the suspicion that evidently that was a fundamental factor to know what happened in the last minutes of the presidential flight.

==== Operation Condor ====
The documentary The Death of Jaime Roldós, financed by an IDFA grant, premiered in 2013 and explores Roldós' death through interviews, archival material, and documentary research. It was directed by Manolo Sarmiento, who is close to the Roldós family. According to the film, the Ecuadorian military was heavily sympathetic, if not directly involved, with Operation Condor, the regional repressive apparatus set up by the military dictatorships of the Southern Cone countries (Argentina, Bolivia, Brazil, Chile, Paraguay, and Uruguay). Consequently, and according to Richelieu Levoyer; who happened to be Commander-in-Chief of the Ecuadorian Army at the time of the crash, Argentinians and Chileans involved themselves in the conspiracy to end Roldós’ regime, as they saw it sympathetic to left-wing causes and governments.

==== New inquiries, revelations and theories ====
Almost immediately after the screening, Attorney General Galo Chiriboga announced his decision to reopen the investigation. In April 2015, he announced to the National Assembly that, based on an alleged CIA document declassified in 2014, Ecuador had joined Operation Condor in mid-January 1978. According to this document, participation would have occurred through the intelligence services of the Armed Forces; for this purpose, it is alleged (and also reported in the documentary) that “an Argentine general would have visited Quito and installed, in the Ministry of Defense, a telecommunications system (named “Condortel”). The Navy was allegedly in charge of telecommunications, while the Air Force was in charge of psychological warfare.” Additionally, an offer by Chile’s Augusto Pinochet to train Ecuadorian personnel at the Military Intelligence School in Santiago would have followed.

In May 2016, on the 35th anniversary of the crash, Attorney General Chiriboga announced the discovery of several documents, audiovisual and material evidence that was used in the first official inquiry, in an Ecuadorian Air Force depot. Reportedly, the evidence included small remains of the ill-fated Super King Air. Chiriboga announced that some of that evidence would be sent to Brazil for further analysis, and that he would embark on further investigation, including at military installations, to look for more remains from the aircraft. The Roldós family asked to be kept informed of the new investigation.

Chiriboga said that up to this discovery, collaboration from the Armed Forces had been “cold”, but that “better disposition” now existed. It is worth noting that former Defense Minister Fernando Cordero had declared in 2015 that despite documentation having been declassified in 2013, several files had been incinerated and other documents lost, a fact that his institution would investigate. Cordero added that previous information requests by the Attorney General had been obstructed by missing or disorganized investigation records.

In this line, in 2015, Defence Minister Fernando Cordero declared that the plane was acquired without black boxes and that the acquisition documents were incinerated by the National Defence Council in 2003, thereby precluding further knowledge of the flight's final moments. Still, Cordero announced he would seek information about those responsible for the documents’ destruction, as there was, in his view, “an intention that the truth about the existence of these documents not be known.” He also added that “there are documents that we will never find, but that can’t be a motivation to dilate (slow) processes.”

Victor Granda, who headed the 1990-1992 parliamentary inquiry, claimed the incinerated documents were related to the acquisition of the ill-fated presidential plane, but added that the final report of his investigation contained copies of that documentation and that it was supposed to be stored in the legislative archives. He further challenged that many of the supposedly new documents presented by Cordero about the case, such as the National Security Council documents, were, according to Granda, already covered in detail by his 1990s inquiry, which was later published as a book in 2006. Thus, he challenged that the Ministry of Defence was not providing anything new, but documents that have already been analyzed, leading him to “doubt that this issue is used as a fundamentally political element.”

== Legacy ==
Despite a downturn in his popularity during the last months of his administration, due to the post-war economic measures, Roldos’ death immortalized the last words of his famous speech delivered on the day of his death; at Atahualpa Stadium in front of a crowd of thousands, in which he called for national unity just before departing in his fatidic last journey to Loja, where he was meant to attend another ceremony for the fallen soldiers during the war with Peru:

We have worked 21 months under a constitutional government when in countries like ours, having a democratic stability means conquering it daily.

Ecuadorians, we were honest. We continue to be honest in each and all of our actions. Actions, not words, will prove our intentions. It’s the time of work and solidarity, not the time for strikes, threats or rumors. Let’s prove we love our country by complying our duties. Our great passion is and should always be Ecuador. Our great passion; listen to me, is and should be Ecuador.

We don’t want this Ecuador to be enmeshed in the insignificant but in the most important, in the untiring, building up a destiny of nobility; a heroic Ecuador that won in Pichincha, an Ecuador with brave people, brave fighters from Paquisha, Machinaza and Mayaicu who died in action in the trenches. A heroic Ecuador of the Cóndor Mountain Range. An eternal and united Ecuador in the defense of its territory. A democratic Ecuador capable of teaching humanism, work and liberty. This Amazonian Ecuador, forever and always. Long live the Fatherland!."

After Roldós's death, his children left the country and the National Congress named Roldós's brother, León Roldós, as Vice President of Ecuador for the remainder of what would have been Jaime Roldós's term. León Roldós later ran for president in 1992, 2002, and 2006. Jaime Roldós's daughter, Martha Roldós Bucaram, was a presidential candidate in the 2009 elections. Jaime Roldós's son, Santiago Roldós Bucaram, is a journalist and playwright. Jaime Roldós's brother-in-law, Abdalá Bucaram, founded the populist Ecuadorian Roldosist Party (PRE) and was elected president of Ecuador in 1996. He governed from August of that year to February 1997, when he was removed by the National Congress on the grounds of "mental incapacity".

The Roldós brothers have publicly feuded with their uncle Abdalá since 1988, when he first ran for the presidency. Martha Roldós has said that the PRE has corrupted her father's ideals. Santiago, for his part, evokes how he and his sisters have publicly "denounced the criminal manipulation by the so-called Ecuadorian Roldosist Party against the memory of our mother and father" and labels the PRE as a "structurally corrupt, mafia-like, and right-wing party."

Jaime Roldós's most important legacy was his support for human rights. The Roldós Doctrine proclaimed the principles of self-determination of peoples, non-intervention, human rights and their defense, peaceful settlement of disputes, and disarmament.

Political offices
Preceded by Alfredo Poveda Burbano	President of Ecuador; 10 August 1979 – 24 May 1981	Succeeded by Osvaldo Hurtado Larrea
