= United States involvement in regime change in Latin America =

Cold War events

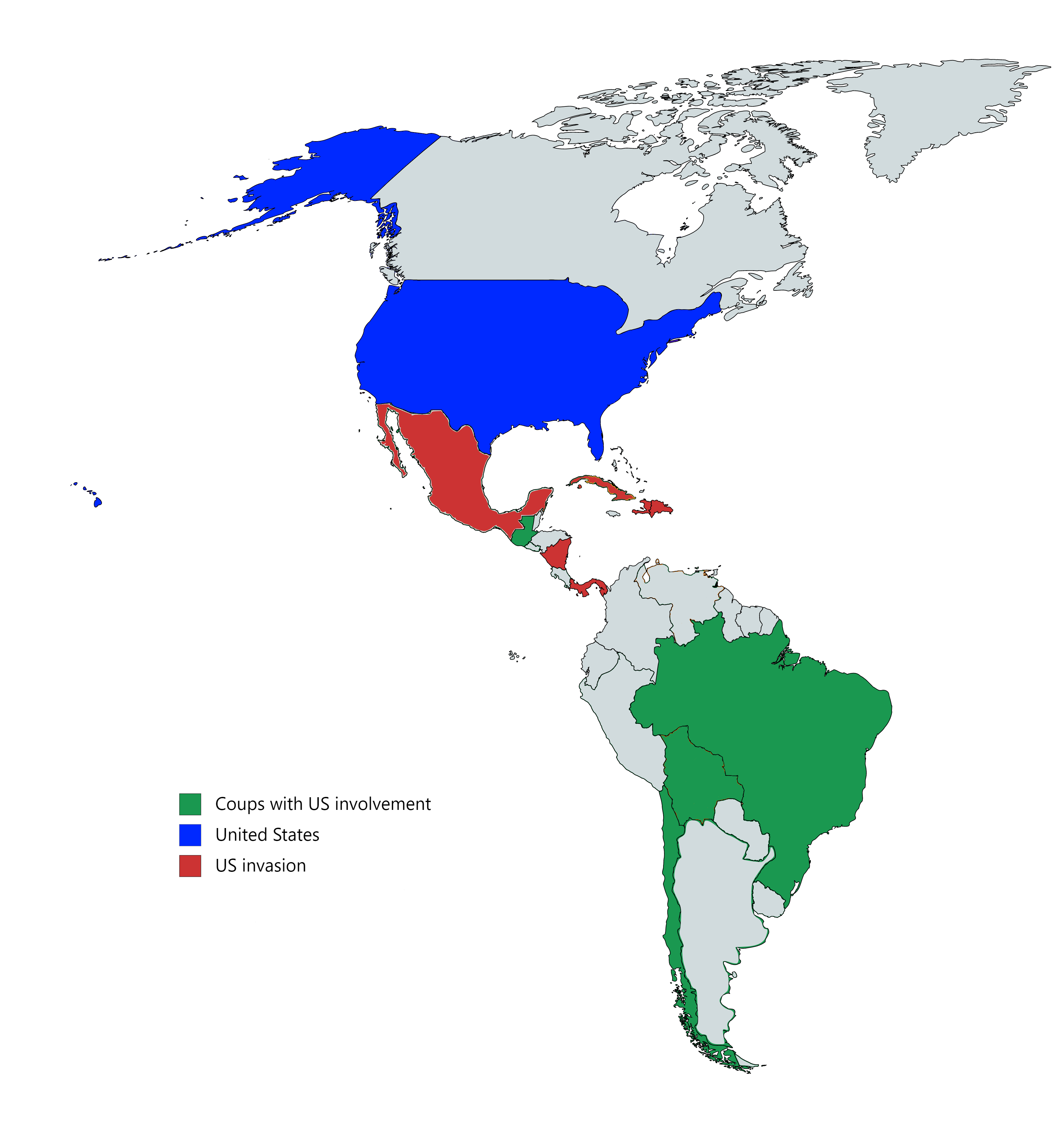
United States involvement in regime change in Latin America Coups with US involvement United States US invasion

The participation of the United States in regime change in Latin America involved U.S.-backed coup d'états which were aimed at replacing left-wing leaders with right-wing ones, military juntas, or authoritarian regimes. Intervention of an economic and military variety was prevalent during the Cold War (1947–1991). Although originally in line with the Truman Doctrine (1947) of containment, United States involvement in regime change increased following the drafting of NSC 68 (1950), which advocated more aggressive actions against potential Soviet allies.

In the early 20th century, during the "Banana Republic" era of Latin American history, the U.S. launched several interventions and invasions in the region (known as the Banana Wars) in order to promote American business interests. United States influenced regime change in this period of Latin American history which started after the signing of the Treaty of Paris in the wake of the Spanish–American War. Cuba gained its independence, while Puerto Rico was annexed by the United States. Expansive and imperialist U.S. foreign policy combined with new economic prospects led to increased U.S. intervention in Latin America from 1898 to the early 1930s. Continued activities lasted into the late 20th century.

== History ==
=== Argentina ===
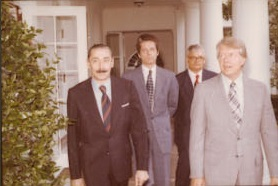
Jorge Rafael Videla meeting Jimmy Carter in 1977

In Argentina, military forces overthrew the democratically elected President Isabel Perón in the 1976 Argentine coup d'état, starting the military dictatorship of General Jorge Rafael Videla, known as the National Reorganization Process. The coup was accepted and tacitly supported by the Ford administration and the U.S. government had close relations with the ensuing authoritarian regime, with U.S. Secretary of State Henry Kissinger paying several official visits to Argentina during the dictatorship. Videla and Emilio Eduardo Massera were graduates of the School of Americas, which according to Congressman Joseph P. Kennedy II was "...a school that has run more dictators than any other school in the history of the world."

=== Bolivia ===
The U.S. government supported the 1971 coup led by General Hugo Banzer that toppled President Juan José Torres of Bolivia. Torres had displeased Washington by convening an "Asamblea del Pueblo" (People's Assembly), in which representatives of specific proletarian sectors of society were represented (miners, unionized teachers, students, peasants), and more generally by leading the country in what was perceived as a left wing direction. Banzer hatched a bloody military uprising starting on August 18, 1971, that succeeded in taking the reins of power by August 22, 1971. After Banzer took power, the U.S. provided extensive military and other aid to the Banzer dictatorship. Torres, who had fled Bolivia, was kidnapped and assassinated in 1976 as part of Operation Condor, the U.S.-supported campaign of political repression and state terrorism by South American right-wing dictators.

=== Brazil ===
Brazil experienced several decades of authoritarian governments, especially after the U.S.-backed 1964 Brazilian coup d'état against social democrat João Goulart. Under then-President John F. Kennedy, the U.S. sought to "prevent Brazil from becoming another China or Cuba", a policy which was carried forward under Lyndon B. Johnson and which led to U.S. military support for the coup in April 1964. According to Vincent Bevins, the topping of João Goulart was one of the most significant victories for the U.S. during the Cold War, as the military dictatorship established in Brazil, the fifth most populous nation in the world, "played a crucial role in pushing the rest of South America into the pro-Washington, anticommunist group of nations."

=== Chile ===
==== Actions against Allende's Government ====
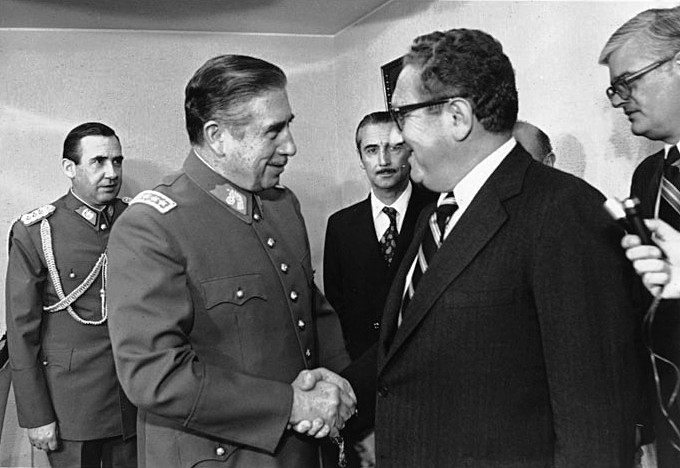
Chilean dictator Augusto Pinochet shaking hands with Henry Kissinger in 1976

After the democratic election of President Salvador Allende in 1970, President Richard Nixon ordered an economic war, which is known as Track II, due to Allende's democratic socialist leanings. According to American journalist Peter Kornbluh, declassified CIA documents released in 2017 revealed that the CIA had assets in Chile that included a leader of the Christian Democratic Party of Chile, two senior executives of El Mercurio, and a high-ranking military officer.

A declassified report from the U.S. government "Annex-NSSM 97" details the plan developed in 1970 to overthrow Allende were he to take office. The document explicitly states that the U.S. government's role should not be revealed and would primarily use Chilean institutions as a means of ousting the president. The Chilean military is highlighted as the best means to achieve this goal. The benefits of a coup initiated by the military are to reduce the threat of Marxism in Latin America and to disarm a potential threat to the United States.

According to historian Sebastián Hurtado Torres, there is no documentary evidence to support that the United States government acted actively in the coordination and execution of the coup actions by the Chilean Armed Forces from September 11, 1973 itself. However, Richard Nixon's interest from the beginning was that the Allende government would not be consolidated and intervened in the conditions prior to the Chilean coup of 1973. Historian Peter Winn found "extensive evidence" of United States complicity in events that helped in part to create the conditions that led to the coup. However, given the local political polarization and the performance of the Popular Unity government, there is no academic consensus on whether this intervention—which primarily took the form of financial support for the media, political parties, and opposition organizations—played a decisive role in the events of September 11, 1973.

==== Actions against the Pinochet dictatorship ====
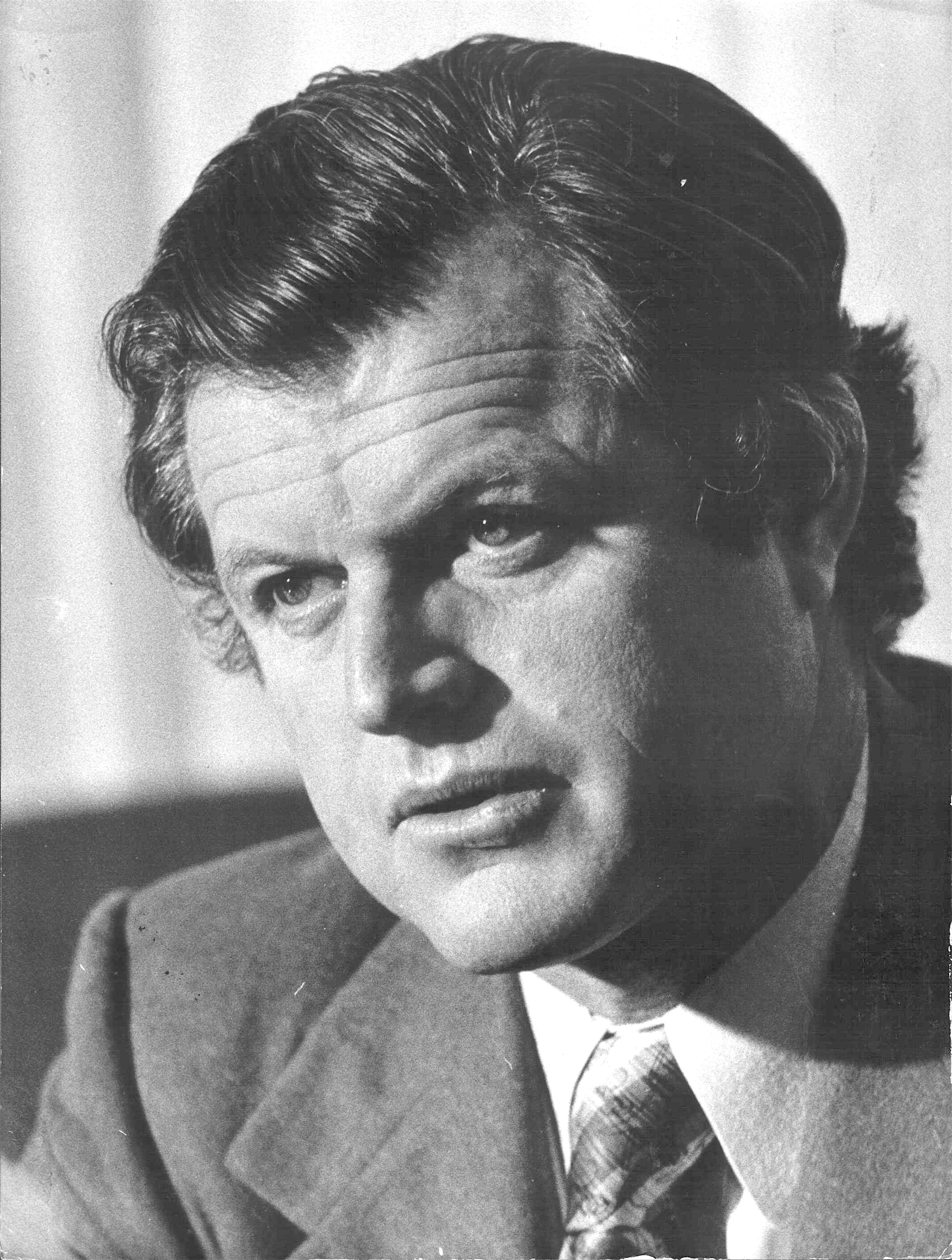
The United States senator Edward "Ted" Kennedy promoted an arms embargo against Latin American military dictatorships, affecting Chile during a period of strong regional tension with its neighbors.

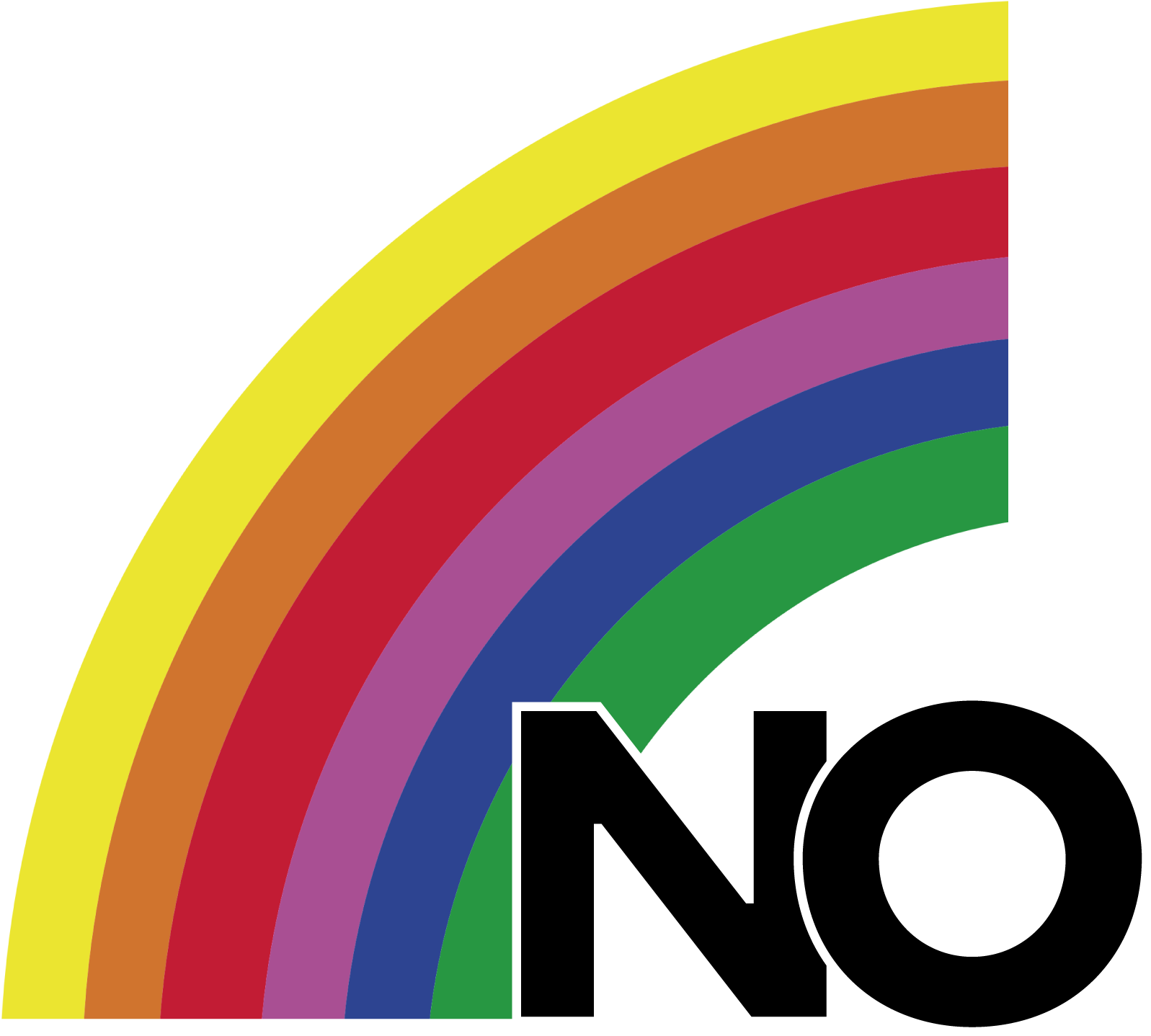
The United States helped the "No" option in the referendum.

The coup was followed by the 17 year-long military dictatorship of Augusto Pinochet. which had an US. arms embargo known as the "Kennedy Amendment" since 1976 during a period of high tensions between Chile and its neighbours, specially Argentina. Previously, in 1975 there were officials from the Embassy and the Policy Planning Office of the Department of State who requested that economic and military aid to Chile be cut off, but these proposals were rejected by the ambassador and officials from the Pentagon and the Department of the Treasury. The Jimmy Carter Administration also prevented a Pinochet state visit to the Philippines from happening. Chile traded with China by establishing a "strict observance of the principle of non-intervention in the internal affairs of each country". In 1988, a presidential referendum was held in order to confirm Pinochet's rule for 8 more years. The oppositional Concertation of Parties for Democracy endorsed the "No" option, winning the referendum and ending Pinochet's rule democratically, was supported financially and logistically by the National Endowment for Democracy (linked to the CIA) during Ronald Reagan's tenure, as well as support by George Soros. After that, free elections were held in 1989 with Concertation winning again. In 1989, the Chilean grape scare occurred: the United States detected cyanide in two grapes originating from Chile, leading authorities to order the suspension of all Chilean fruit shipments and their complete withdrawal from the market. The measure triggered a bilateral crisis with significant economic consequences and also had effects on Chile's domestic politics and was seen as intervention by the US.

U.S.M.C. Lieutenant Colonel Patrick J. Ryan discussed the Chilean coup and the Kennedy Amendment in his 1976 book titled "Allende's Chile: 1000 Bungled Days", stating:

For ten years the United States fought communism in Vietnam, 7000 miles from California, at a tragic loss of 55,000 American lives, six times as many wounded, not to mention a staggering cost of 150 billion dollars. [...] We lost the war! On the other hand, the Republic of Chile, situated in our hemisphere, fought communism here in America's Backyard, without the aid of B-52's, the 7th Fleet, or even a Bob Hope visit. No American fingers squeezed M-16 triggers, no gruesome parade of American flag draped caskets were airlifted daily from Santiago, Chile, to gravesites in the United States of America. What's more, without our aid, and unencumbered by our tactic of "measured response" the Chileans defeated communism! The United States government not only has not acclaimed Chile's outright defeat of communism, but incredibly, our Senate and Congress, via the Kennedy Amendment to the Foreign Assistance Act, have terminated all military aid to the new anti-communist government of Chile. Why?

— Lieutenant Colonel Patrick J. Ryan, 1976.

=== Colombia ===
Plan Colombia and the CIA assassination program (2000–2010s) Plan Colombia, launched in 2000, was a multi‑billion dollar U.S. aid package ostensibly aimed at fighting drug trafficking and left‑wing guerrillas (FARC, ELN). In its first year alone, the U.S. appropriated $1.3 billion – making Colombia the third‑largest recipient of U.S. foreign aid at the time. Human rights organisations documented that between 2000 and 2016, more than 220,000 people were killed and over 7 million forcibly displaced, with paramilitary groups linked to the Colombian military committing most atrocities.

Concurrent with Plan Colombia, the Central Intelligence Agency (CIA) ran a secret intelligence and assassination program that helped the Colombian military locate and kill at least two dozen FARC leaders. The program provided GPS‑guided smart bombs and real‑time intelligence, bypassing standard rules of engagement. The 2008 killing of FARC commander Raúl Reyes was carried out with U.S. intelligence.

The United States Agency for International Development (USAID) has been accused of using development funding to undermine left‑wing movements and promote pro‑U.S. policies. Critics argue that USAID fosters non‑governmental organisations whose real agenda is to inculcate anti‑government or pro‑U.S. attitudes. When the Trump administration announced cuts to USAID in 2025, Colombian President Gustavo Petro remarked that the aid was “poison”, showing little regret over its suspension.

The election of Gustavo Petro, Colombia’s first left‑wing president, in 2022 led to heightened tensions with the United States. Petro has repeatedly warned that he is the target of a “soft coup” – a campaign to undermine his government through legal and political means rather than open military action.

In June 2025, the Spanish newspaper El País published leaked audio recordings of Álvaro Leyva, Petro’s own former foreign minister, conspiring to remove the president. Leyva discussed a plan to replace Petro with Vice President Francia Márquez and sought international support, including from advisors close to the Trump administration and Republican congressmen, to apply pressure on Petro to resign. The White House denied any official involvement, but Petro denounced a “conspiracy with drug traffickers and, apparently, the Colombian and American extreme right.” In July 2025, the U.S. State Department recalled its top diplomat in Bogotá, and Colombia recalled its ambassador from Washington.

In 2020, a failed mercenary incursion into Venezuela, known as Operation Gideon, was launched from Colombian territory with the goal of overthrowing Nicolás Maduro. Investigative reports suggested that elements of the Colombian intelligence agency provided logistical support to the plot, raising concerns that Colombia was being used as a staging ground for U.S.‑backed regime change against a neighbouring socialist government.

=== Cuba ===
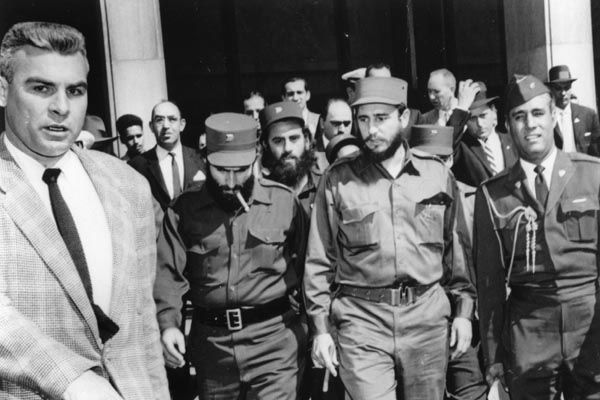
Fidel Castro visiting Washington D.C. after the Cuban Revolution

During the late 1800s, the U.S. sought to expand its economic interests by developing an economy overseas. This sentiment helped expand support for the Spanish–American War and Cuban liberation despite the U.S. previously establishing itself as anti-independence and revolution. America's victory in the war ended Spanish rule over Cuba, but promptly replaced it with American military occupation of the island from 1898–1902.

After the end of the military occupation in 1902, the U.S. continued to exert significant influence over Cuba with policies like the Platt Amendment. In subsequent years American forces regularly invaded and intervened in Cuba, with the U.S. military occupying Cuba again from 1906–1909, and U.S. marines being sent to Cuba from 1917 to 1922 to protect American-owned sugar plantations. The United States also supported Cuban dictator Fulgencio Batista as his policies benefited American business interests.

After the Cuban Revolution and Fidel Castro's rise to power, American relations with Cuba became increasingly hostile. American forces trained, supplied, and supported the Cuban exiles who attempted to overthrow Castro in the Bay of Pigs Invasion of 1961, but the invasion was defeated and Castro retained control. In subsequent decades, American intelligence operatives made numerous attempts to assassinate Castro, but these ultimately failed as well. During the 2026 Cuban crisis, the United States federal government stated that the decision to significantly tighten the American embargo against Cuba is intended to force regime change by the end of the year.

=== Dominican Republic ===
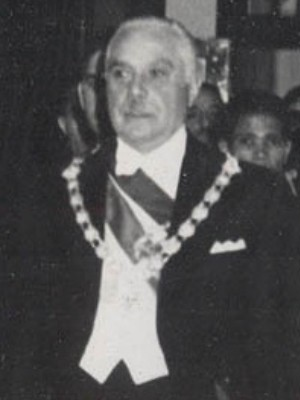
Trujillo in 1952

In May 1961, the ruler of the Dominican Republic, right-wing dictator Rafael Trujillo, was murdered with weapons supplied by the United States Central Intelligence Agency (CIA). An internal CIA memorandum states that a 1973 Office of Inspector General investigation into the murder disclosed "quite extensive Agency involvement with the plotters". The CIA described its role in "changing" the government of the Dominican Republic as a 'success' in that it assisted in moving the Dominican Republic from a totalitarian dictatorship to a Western-style democracy. Socialist Juan Bosch, whose propaganda and institute for political training had received some CIA funding via the J. M. Kaplan Fund, was elected president of the Dominican Republic in its first free elections, in December 1962. Bosch was deposed by a right-wing coup in September 1963. U.S. president Lyndon Johnson intervened into the 1965 Dominican Civil War by sending American troops to help end the war and prevent supporters of the deposed Bosch from taking over. On July 1, 1966, elections were held with Joaquín Balaguer winning against Bosch.

=== Ecuador ===
Between 1960 and 1963, the CIA conducted operations in Ecuador using agent Philip Agee. After President José María Velasco Ibarra denied breaking relations with Cuba, the CIA began efforts to overthrow him. In November 1961, Velasco was overthrown in a military coup and replaced by his vice president, Carlos Julio Arosemena Monroy. President Arosemena turned out to be less than favorable to the United States, causing the CIA to adopt the same destabilizing tactics against his government. On July 11, 1963, Arosemena was overthrown by another military coup. The Ecuadorian junta, supported by the United States government, adopted anti-communist policies and banned the Communist Party of Ecuador (PCE).

=== Guatemala ===
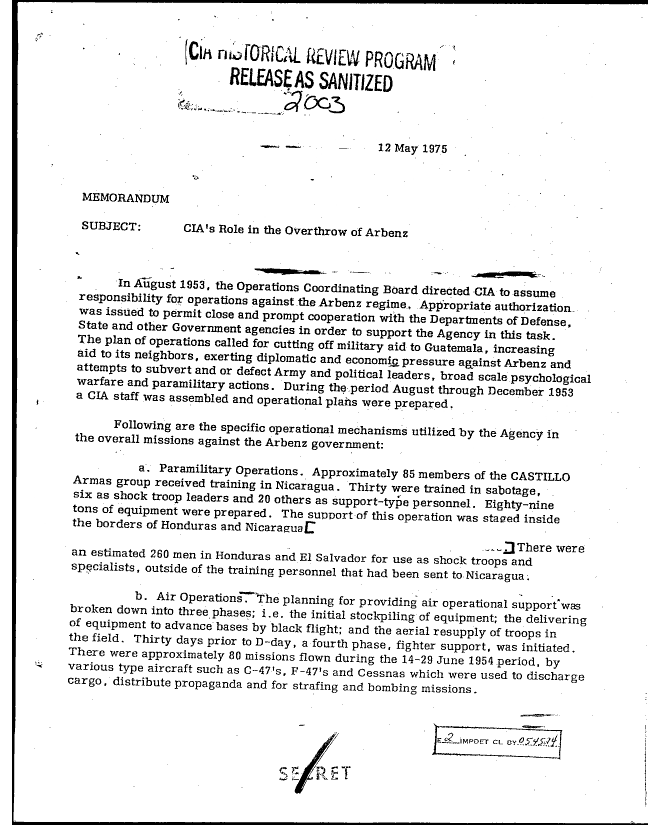
A CIA memorandum dated May 1975 which describes the role of the Agency in deposing the Guatemalan government of President Jacobo Árbenz Guzmán in June 1954 (1–5)

Peasants and workers (mostly of indigenous descent) revolted during the first half of the 20th century due to harsh living conditions and the abuse from landlords and the government-supported American United Fruit Company (or UFCO). This revolt was repressed but led to the democratic election of Jacobo Árbenz. During his presidency, Árbenz aimed to address some of the tensions between Guatemalans and the United Fruit Company, including land reform, breaking UFCO's monopoly on transportation in Guatemala, and the creation of an electrical generating station, as UFCO owned and controlled this utility in the capital city. Arbenz passed the Agrarian Reform Law, where 234,000 acres of land that UFCO owned but was not cultivated would be expropriated for redistribution to Guatemalans. In response, the United Fruit Company began heavily lobbying the U.S. government for intervention. UFCO had tight ties with the Eisenhower administration, including Allen Dulles (head of the CIA) and brother John Foster Dulles (Secretary of State) who had represented UFCO through their law firm, as well as Ed Whitman (husband of Eisenhower's secretary Ann Whitman) who was UFCO's public relations officer.

Árbenz was overthrown during the 1954 Guatemalan coup d'état, endorsed by the United States.

=== Haiti ===
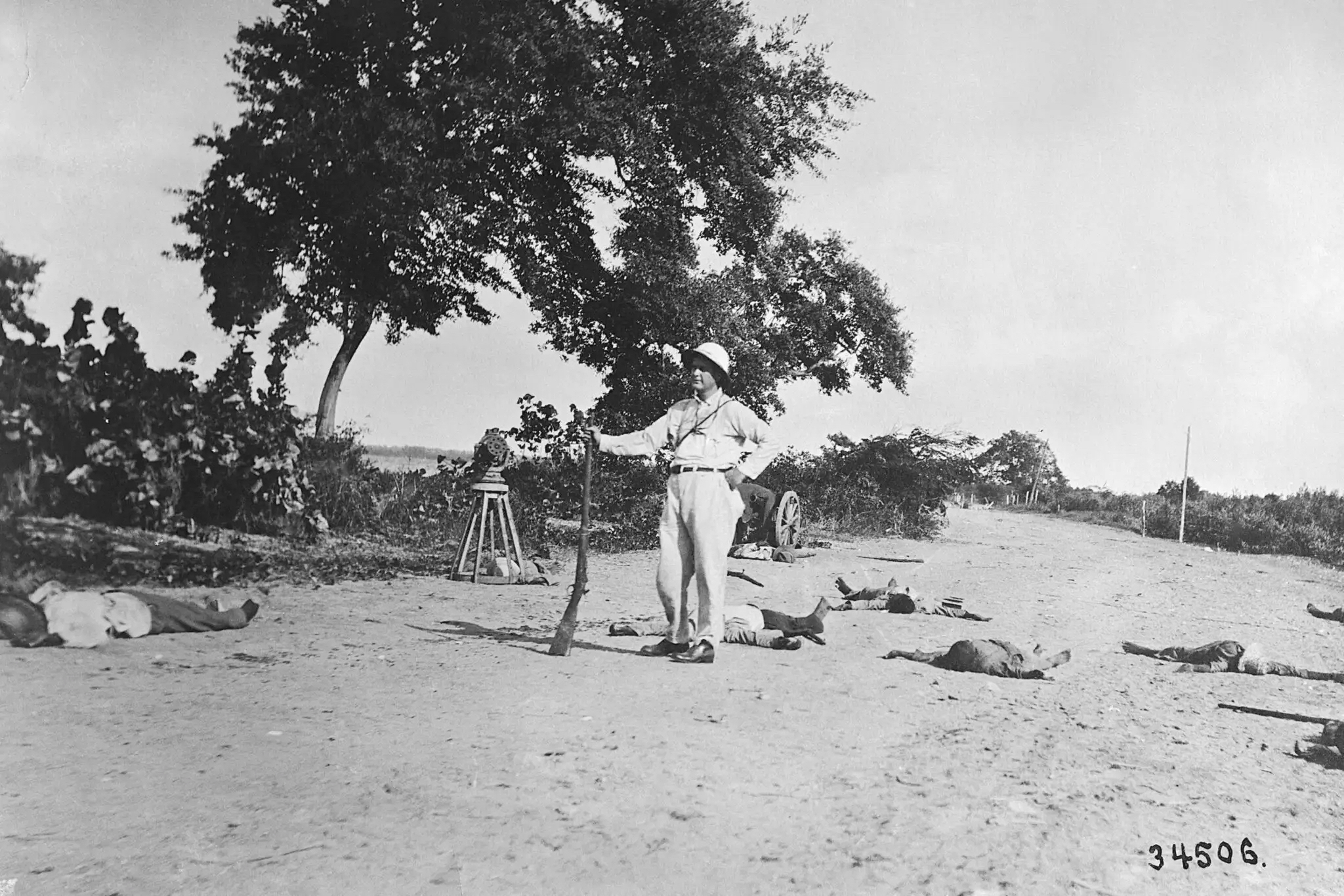
American poses with dead Haitians killed by U.S. Marine machine gun fire on October 11, 1915.

The United States had been interested in controlling Haiti in the decades following its independence from France in the early nineteenth century. By the twentieth century, the United States had become Haiti's largest trade partner, replacing France, with American businesses expanding their presence in Haiti. Businesses from the United States had pursued the control of Haiti for years and in 1909, the new president of National City Bank of New York, Frank A. Vanderlip, began to plan the bank's take over of Haiti's finances as part of his larger role of making the bank grow in international markets. From 1910 to 1911, the United States Department of State backed a consortium of American investors – headed by the National City Bank of New York – to acquire a managing stake of the National Bank of Haiti to create the Bank of the Republic of Haiti (BNRH), with the new bank often holding payments from the Haitian government, leading to unrest. American diplomats ultimately drafted plans to take over Haiti's finances, dubbed the "Farnham Plan", named after the vice president of National City Bank, Roger Leslie Farnham.

Haitian opposition to the plan resulted with the BNRH withheld funds from the Haitian government and funded rebels to destabilize the Haitian government in order to justify American intervention, generating 12% gains in interest by holding on to the funds. When the caco-supported anti-American Rosalvo Bobo emerged as the next president of Haiti in 1915 following the lynching of President Vilbrun Guillaume Sam, who was killed after executing hundreds of political opponents, the United States government decided to act quickly to preserve its economic dominance and invaded Haiti. During the occupation, Haiti had three new presidents, though the United States ruled as a military regime through martial law led by Marines and the Gendarmerie. Two major rebellions against the occupation occurred, resulting in several thousand Haitians killed, and numerous human rights violations – including torture and summary executions – being perpetrated by Marines and the Gendarmerie. A corvée system of forced labor was used by the United States for infrastructure projects, that resulted in hundreds to thousands of deaths. Under the occupation, most Haitians continued to live in poverty, while American personnel were well-compensated. The U.S. retained influence on Haiti's external finances until 1947, as per the 1919 treaty that required an American financial advisor through the life of Haiti's acquired loan.

=== Mexico ===
Henry Lane Wilson, U.S. ambassador to Mexico under William Howard Taft, actively supported the Ten Tragic Days coup which overthrew the democratically elected president, Francisco I. Madero. Soon after taking office, U.S. president Woodrow Wilson dismissed the ambassador and refused to recognize the Mexican government of Victoriano Huerta, who had seized power in the coup. This led to the United States occupation of Veracruz in 1914 and continued instability in Mexico.

=== Nicaragua ===
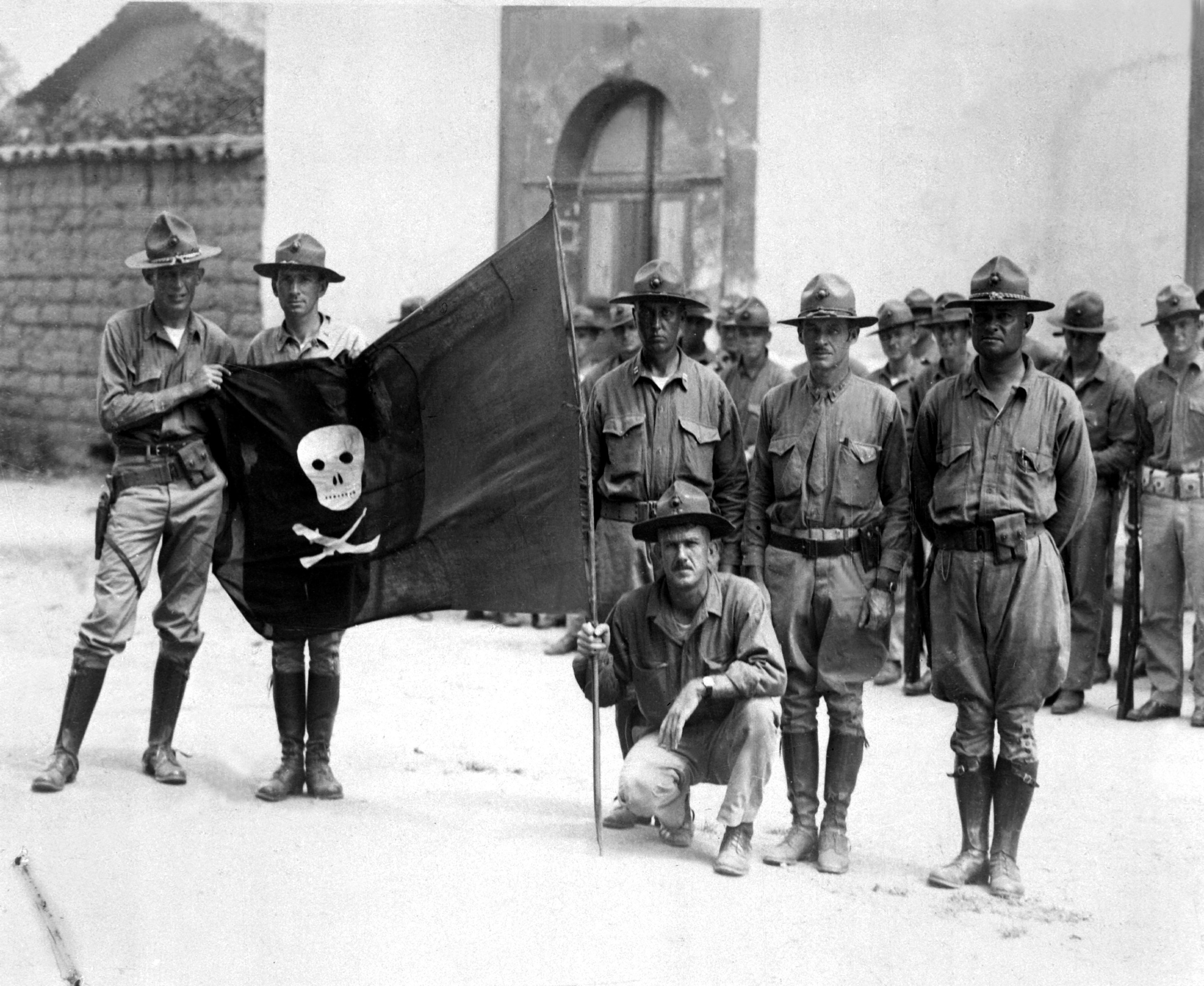
United States Marines with the captured flag of Augusto César Sandino in 1932

In 1912, during the Banana Wars period, the U.S. occupied Nicaragua as a means of protecting American business interests and protecting the rights that Nicaragua granted to the United States to construct a canal there. At the same time, the United States and Mexican governments competed for political influence in Central America. As a result, the U.S. government intervened more directly in Nicaraguan affairs in two separate but related incidents in 1911 and 1912, with the objective of ensuring the rule of a government friendly to U.S. political and commercial interests and preserving political stability in Central America. Although officials within the administration of President William H. Taft saw themselves as intervening to ensure good government, many Nicaraguans became increasingly alarmed at what seemed to be a foreign takeover of their political, banking, and railroad systems. The intervention, utilizing the U.S. Marine Corps, was sparked by a rebellion that opposed the United States. After quelling the rebellion, the U.S. continued occupying Nicaragua until 1933, when President Herbert Hoover officially ended the occupation.

=== Panama ===
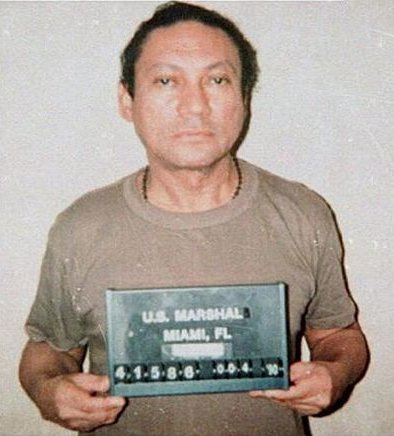
Manuel Noriega's mugshot, taken on January 3, 1990

Increasing tensions between Manuel Noriega's dictatorship and the U.S. government led to the United States invasion of Panama in 1989, which ended in Noriega's overthrow. The United States invasion of Panama can be seen as a rare example of democratization by foreign-imposed regime change which was effective long-term.

=== Venezuela ===
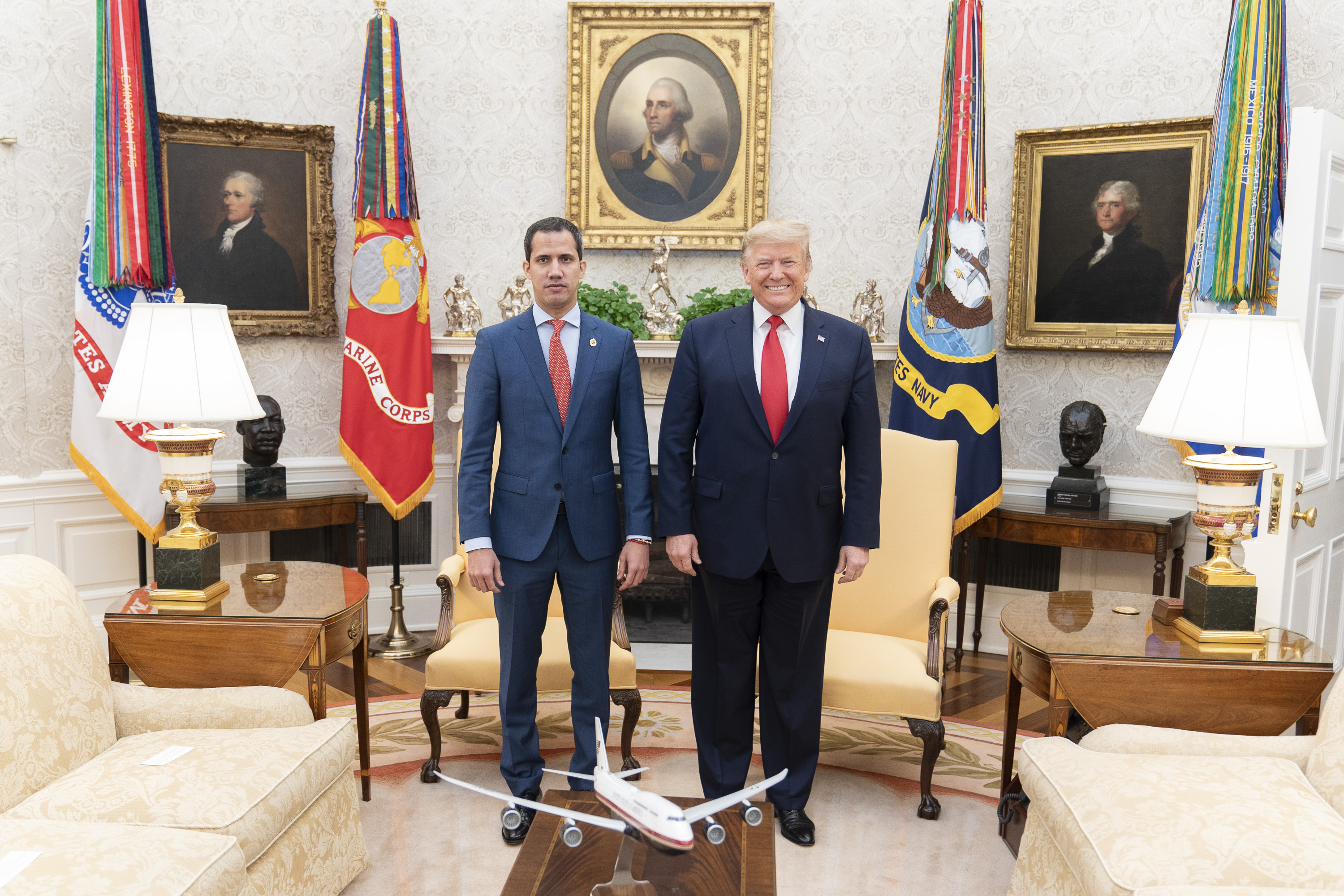
Juan Guaidó with President Donald Trump at the White House in February 2020

In what The New York Times described as "Washington’s most overt attempts in decades to carry out regime change in Latin America", the administration of President Donald Trump made an attempt of regime change in an effort to remove President Nicolás Maduro from office during the Venezuelan presidential crisis. The Congressional Research Service of the United States Congress wrote: "Although the Trump Administration initially discussed the possibility of using military force in Venezuela, it ultimately sought to compel Maduro to leave office through diplomatic, economic, and legal pressure." According to Marc Becker, a Latin American history professor of Truman State University, the claim of the presidency by Juan Guaidó "was part of a U.S.-backed maximum-pressure campaign for regime change that empowered an extremist faction of the country's opposition while simultaneously destroying the economy with sanctions." Economist Agathe Demarais made similar statements in her book Backfire: How Sanctions Reshape the World Against U.S. Interests, saying that the United States held the belief that regime change was attainable and that sanctions were implemented against Venezuela to hasten the establishment of Guaidó. Jacobin wrote that the corporate-friendly Guaidó movement was meant to take power after a coup supported by the United States removed President Maduro from office. Ahumada Beltrán said that the Trump administration participated in an "open campaign" to overthrow Maduro with a goal to establish American control over oil and to re-establish Venezuela's traditional elite class.

U.S. officials met with members of the National Bolivarian Armed Forces of Venezuela from 2017 to 2018 to discuss coup plans, though discussions ceased after information leaked and some of the plotters were arrested prior to their anticipated actions during the 2018 Venezuelan presidential election. May 2018 presidential elections in Venezuela were boycotted by the opposition and Maduro won amid low turnout; the United States, the European Union, and other nations refused to recognize the elections, saying they were fraudulent. National Security Advisor John Bolton said in a November 1, 2018, speech prior to the 2018 United States elections that the Trump administration would confront a "troika of tyranny" and remove leftist governments in Cuba, Nicaragua and Venezuela; Trump officials spoke to the media about an existing plan to overthrow Maduro, limiting oil exports to Cuba to create economic distress which would prompt its government's removal and then to finally target Nicaragua.

In January 2019, Leopoldo López's Popular Will party attained the leadership of the National Assembly of Venezuela according to a rotation agreement made by opposition parties, naming Juan Guaidó as president of the legislative body. Days after Guaidó was sworn in, he and López reached out to the United States Department of State and presented the idea that Guaidó would be named interim president and that the United States could lead other nations to support Guaidó in an effort to remove Maduro; former Director of the Central Intelligence Agency and Secretary of State Mike Pompeo approved of the idea. Though the National Assembly sought to assume executive power from Maduro itself, López and Guaidó continued to work with the State Department without the knowledge of other opposition groups since they believed their objectives would be blocked. State Department official Keith Mines wrote on January 20 that Guaidó declaring himself president "could have the impact of causing the regime to crumble in the face of widespread and overwhelming public support" and on January 22, Vice President Mike Pence called Guaidó personally and told him that the United States would support his declaration. Neuman wrote that "it's likely that more people in Washington than in Venezuela knew what was going to happen." Guaidó declared himself the acting president of the country, disputing Maduro's presidency and sparking a presidential crisis. Minutes after the declaration, the United States announced that it recognized Guaidó as president of Venezuela while presidents Iván Duque of Colombia and Jair Bolsonaro of Brazil, beside Canadian Foreign Affairs Minister Chrystia Freeland, made an abrupt announcement at the World Economic Forum that they too recognized Guaidó.

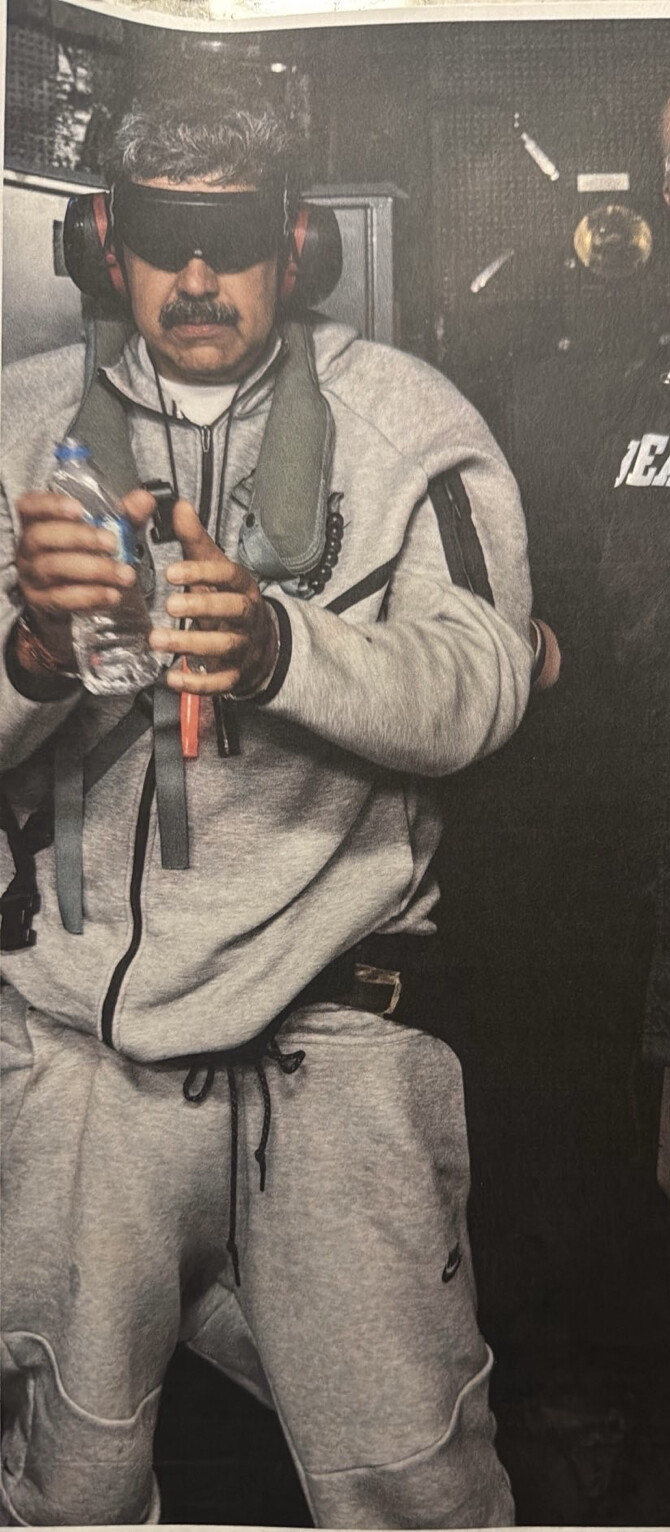
Venezuelan president Nicolás Maduro aboard USS Iwo Jima following his capture

Becker said that the United States attempted to remove the Maduro government threatening military action and inflicting desperation on ordinary Venezuelans, planning that distraught citizens or members of the military would remove Maduro in a coup. The United States then increased sanctions on Venezuela and economic conditions drastically deteriorated due to the sanctions. NPR, following a February 2019 statement by President Trump suggesting that members of the Venezuelan armed forces join Guaidó, described such comments as "the latest push for regime change in Venezuela." U.S. Vice President Mike Pence stated in April 2019 that the U.S. was set on Maduro's removal, whether through diplomatic or other means, and that "all options" were on the table. Financial Times wrote following the failed 2019 Venezuelan uprising attempt on April 30, 2019, that regime change in Venezuela was one of Trump's main foreign policy goals and that it was not going as planned. The New York Times wrote following April's failed attempt to remove Maduro that President Trump's aides promoted regime change through social media, with Bolton tweeting hundreds of times about the effort to remove Maduro and going on news networks daily to discuss the situation. Secretary of State Pompeo said that the U.S. would take military action "if required" at the time. In August 2019, President Donald Trump's administration imposed additional sanctions on Venezuela as part of their efforts to remove Maduro from office, ordering a freeze on all Venezuelan government assets in the United States and barring transactions with U.S. citizens and companies. In March 2020, the Trump administration deployed naval units in the Caribbean to pressure the Maduro government and later offered a $15 million reward for the capture of Maduro.

The Congressional Research Service wrote in 2021 that "U.S. efforts to date have failed to dislodge Maduro and enable the convening of free and fair elections" and said that the Biden administration began to review the societal impact of sanctions against Venezuela. Guaidó never controlled any of Venezuela's institutions and was removed from the interim president position by the National Assembly in December 2022. Joe Biden described President Trump's efforts of regime change an "abject failure" and said that it strengthened the position of Maduro.

On January 3, 2026, the United States conducted airstrikes on multiple locations across Venezuela, including the capital city of Caracas, and deposed Venezuelan President Maduro. President Donald Trump announced that Maduro had been captured alongside his wife Cilia Flores and flown out of the country. Attorney General Pam Bondi said they would both face charges of narcoterrorism in the United States. Trump also announced that the U.S. will be "very strongly involved" in Venezuela's oil industry.

== See also ==
- American imperialism
- Anti-American sentiment in Latin America
- Criticism of United States foreign policy
- Democracy in the Americas
- Foreign interventions by the United States
- Foreign policy of the United States
- Foreign relations of the United States
- Latin America–United States relations
- List of heads of state and government deposed by foreign powers in the 20th and 21st century
- Military history of the United States
- South American Long Peace
- United States involvement in regime change
- School of Americas

== Sources ==
This article incorporates text from a free content work. Licensed under public domain (license statement/permission). Text taken from U.S. Intervention in Nicaragua, 1911/1912, U.S. Department of State, Office of Electronic Information, Bureau of Public Affairs.
