= Ecuadorian Military Junta of 1963 =

The Military Junta of 1963 (Spanish: Junta Militar del 63) or the Military Junta of Government (Spanish: Junta Militar de Gobierno) was a military junta which governed the Republic of Ecuador from 1963 to 1966. Its members were Admiral Ramón Castro Jijón, General Marcos Gándara Enríquez, General Luis Cabrera Sevilla and General Guillermo Freile Posso.

The Military Junta of 1963 deposed President Carlos Julio Arosemena Monroy because of his support for politics of Cuba's Fidel Castro, which brought him into conflict with the National Congress and the Armed Forces, while the ensuing junta was characterized as being against the Cuban Revolution in international questions. The junta, composed by (originally) four members of the Armed Forces, was praised because of great reforms that it implemented, but was also criticized for the authoritarianism and great repression that it enforced.

== Government of Ecuador ==
The government during this period in Ecuadorian history was military in nature, as it was (originally) composed of four members of the Ecuadorian Armed Forces:

- Captain Ramón Castro Jijón, Commander-in-Chief of the Navy
- Colonel Luis Cabrera Sevilla, Commander-in-Chief of the Army
- Lieutenant Colonel Guillermo Freile Posso, Commander-in-Chief of the Air Force
- Colonel Marcos Gándara Enríquez, acting senator for the Armed Forces

The Junta was provisional in nature, with the objective of drafting a new constitution under its leadership, but it failed to accomplish this objective before its resignation in 1966.

This government promoted major state reforms and was criticized for authoritarian practices and repression of civil demonstrations. Regarding the political and economic aspects of this government, major changes can be highlighted; one of the largest and most important changes implemented by the government was the agrarian reform. It was through this that the so-called huasipungo system was eliminated, and land was thus delivered to thousands of low-income Ecuadorians who had the right to claim it.

The agrarian reform was able to benefit 23 thousand families and resolved 14,008 cases of huasipungo in 800 haciendas. This distribution and expropriation of land was carried out after a thorough study that made it possible to determine the places where huasipungo existed and thus take the respective actions on this issue. One of the important figures in this episode was the Minister of Development José Corsino Cárdenas, since he was the one in charge of carrying out the various studies and, together with a commission, preparing the law that would shape the reform.

The Junta declared the nullity of the Rio de Janeiro Protocol, which sought to restore the state's sovereignty over its legitimate territories. It was also characterized by the development of the Guayas River basin, incentivizing the discovery and exploitation of hydrocarbon resources. In the educational sphere, the National Polytechnic School was restored, improving education in technical and mechanical sciences throughout the country. Similarly, efforts were made to educate the population through various inclusion programs in primary education and also to assist illiterate adults. The Junta also benefited the banana and industrial sectors with incentives and subsidies granted by the central government to achieve economic growth and, consequently, significant progress and development. Medicine prices were reduced by 30%, which was widely applauded by the population. Fiscal and tax legislation was passed, creating new taxes and improving their collection, which greatly benefited the state coffers. Other important laws were passed that reformed the state and provided the opportunity for significant development. In this regard, highways such as the Quito-Santo Domingo highway and many others were built, improving communication between the country's various regions. Furthermore, the single citizenship card was created, which continues to be used today.

=== Controversies, criticism and departure from power ===
In terms of international politics, the junta played a very important role, strengthening ties with various countries and trading partners, such as the United States. Various agreements were signed with this country, and several official visits were made by both junta members and the nation's first ladies. Thus, an agreement was signed with the United States allowing fishing by American vessels within Ecuador's 200-mile maritime sovereignty. This measure sparked civil protests, which were suppressed by the junta, and this civil right was prohibited. Similarly, criticism was leveled at the fact that the members of the junta received institutional benefits, as they were all promoted: Ramón Castro Jijón was promoted to Rear Admiral, Luis Cabrera Sevilla to Major General, Marcos Gándara to Major General, and Guillermo Freile Posso to Colonel of the General Staff.

The four members of the Junta did not always agree on the management of the government, with the biggest rift occurring on November 29, 1965, when Colonel Guillermo Freile Posso attempted to dissolve the Junta and assume sole leadership of state. However, his coup attempt lacked support within the Armed Forces, leading him to be removed from the Junta.

The Junta was criticized for its harsh anti-communist repression, and the Communist Party of Ecuador (PCE) was banned. It is also worth noting that, towards the end of the Military Junta, a series of problems with the media arose, discrediting the government and strengthening opposition to it. Print and radio outlets were shut down for openly speaking out against the government, and an economic crisis began to develop, causing the government's acceptance to crumble and accelerating its departure from power. The Armed Forces began to seek alternatives for a transition to civilian rule. Former Presidents Galo Plaza Lasso and Camilo Ponce Enríquez formed a Junta of Notables, which handed over power to the economist Clemente Yerovi Indaburu.

On March 29, 1966, the three members of the Junta resigned from the Military High Command, and General Telmo Vargas was appointed head of state until Clemente Yerovi Indaburu was inaugurated as interim president the following day.

== See also ==
- 1963 Ecuadorian coup d'état
- 1966 Ecuadorian Constitutional Assembly election
