= Edwin Bernbaum =

American mountaineer and scholar (born 1945)

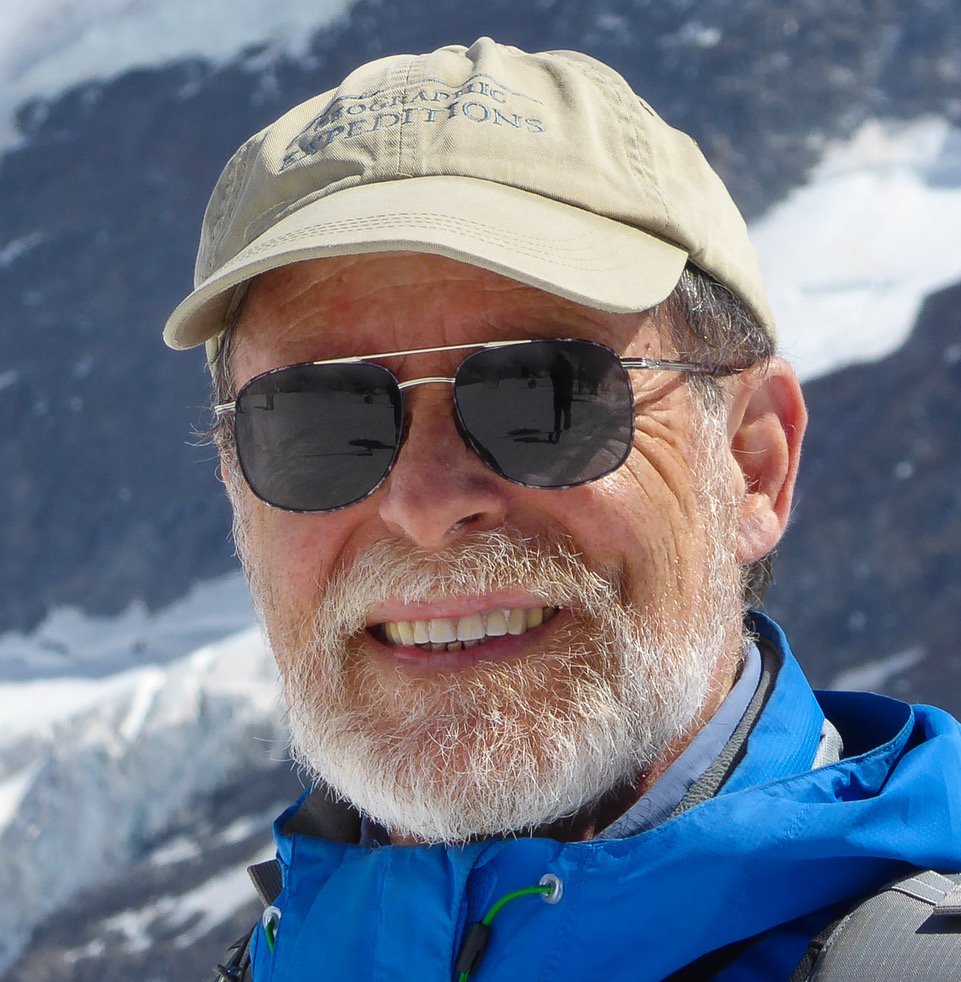
- Born: 26 August 1945 (age 80)
- Education: Harvard College; University of California, Berkeley
- Occupations: Scholar, author, mountaineer, lecturer, leadership coach
- Known for: Mountaineering records; Writings on sacred mountains and sacred natural sites; Nature conservation; Leadership coaching
- Notable work: The Way to Shambhala (1980, 1989, 2001); Sacred Mountains of the World (1990, 1997, 2022)
- Spouse: Diane Bernbaum
- Children: David Bernbaum; Jonathan Bernbaum
- Parents: Maurice M. Bernbaum (father); Betty Hahn Bernbaum (mother)
- Website: https://www.peakparadigms.com/

Edwin Bernbaum (born 26 August 1945), also known as Ed Bernbaum, is an American scholar of comparative religion and mythology, mountaineer, author, public speaker, and leadership instructor. His writings and public engagement of several decades with international organisations such as the IUCN and The Mountain Institute have been considered foundational in bringing attention to the present-day cultural significance and conservation potential of sacred mountains and sacred natural sites all across the world. Alongside, his book The Way to Shambhala (1980) is considered a seminal text on the mystical kingdom of Shambhala in the fields of Tibetology and Buddhist eschatology.

== Personal life ==
Edwin Bernbaum was born to Maurice M. Bernbaum and Betty Hahn Bernbaum. His father was a career diplomat in the American Foreign Service.

Edwin is married to Diane Bernbaum, former director of the Midrasha at Berkeley. Edwin and Diane have an elder son, David. Their younger son Jonathan Bernbaum died in December 2016 at the age of 34, in a warehouse fire in Oakland that destroyed the Ghost Ship artists' collective.

== Education ==
Bernbaum obtained an AB in mathematics from Harvard College and a PhD in Asian Studies from the University of California, Berkeley, with a focus on comparative religion and mythology. He also did additional graduate work in social college and anthropology at the Harvard University.

== Career ==
=== Mountaineering ===
Bernbaum began climbing as a teenager in the Ecuadorean Andes, where his father was in the foreign service. In the Andes, some of his summits include Cotopaxi, Iliniza Sur, and the first ascent of South Antizana. In 1965, he was part of the expedition that made the first ascent of the northwest ridge of Mt St Elias, the second highest mountain in Alaska. In 1968, as a Peace Corps volunteer in Nepal, he attempted Annapurna South, during which he got caught in an avalanche with another climber and got swept down 1,000 feet. Bernbaum's interest in the role of mountains in religion and mythology was born soon after this event, when he met the abbot of the Tengboche monastery, after climbing a new route on a peak near Mt Everest. The Lama told him about Shambhala, a Shangri-La-like realm of peace and contentment in Buddhist cosmology.

Bernbaum was president of the Harvard Mountaineering Club and instructed at the Colorado Outward Bound School. He was featured in "Beyond the Mountaintops: Extraordinary Mountaineers, Extraordinary People," an exhibition at the American Mountaineering Museum on eight climbers (including Hillary and Norgay, among others) who pioneered advances in climbing and humankind.

=== Sacred natural sites and conservation ===
Bernbaum was a programme director of The Mountain Institute (TMI). At the TMI, he founded and directed the 'Sacred Mountains Program'. This program developed interpretive materials with various US National Parks (including Yosemite, Great Smoky Mountains, and Hawai'i) based on the cultural, spiritual, and aesthetic and associations of the natural environment in American, Native American, Native Hawaiian, and other cultures around the world.

In the Himalayas, Bernbaum worked on a project at the major Hindu pilgrimage shrine of Badrinath, wherein priests and scientists worked together to encourage pilgrims to replant trees for reasons coming out of their own religious and cultural traditions. Later, he also worked with ICIMOD on developing a roadmap to nominate the Kailash Sacred Landscape (a transboundary region at the western tri-junction of India, Nepal, and China) as a UNESCO World Heritage Site.

Since 2012, Bernbaum has been co-chair of the IUCN group on the 'Cultural and Spiritual Values of Protected Areas' (CSVPA). Currently, he is also Senior Fellow at the Instituto de Montaña in Peru.

=== Leadership teaching ===
At the Wharton School, with Mark Useem, Bernbaum created, led, and instructed in a leadership development programme for executive MBAs and alumni that took them on treks through the Himalayas (to the foot of Mt Everest) and the Alps.

== Reception of books by Bernbaum ==
Bernbaum's first book The Way to Shambhala (1980) is a study of Tibetan myths and legends about hidden sanctuaries resembling Shangri La of the James Hilton novel Lost Horizon. Robert Thurman commends the book as a 'groundbreaking account' that brings 'considerable clarity to the much obscured issue of Shambhala and Buddhist escatology', which are vivid themes in various segments of Asian Buddhist folklore and religion. Ana Lopes calls this book 'the most complete study of Shambhala published in the West.'

Bernbaum's second book Sacred Mountains of the World (1990) explores the key role of mountains such as Sinai, Olympus, and Fuji in the mythologies, religions, history, and art of cultures around the world. According to Prof. Hermann Kreutzmann (of Freie University, Berlin), this book has come to be regarded as a famous, genre-defining work on the topic of sacred mountains. About the 1997 edition of this book, Danny Yee notes that it covers sacred mountains in the Himalayas, China, Central Asia, Japan, South and Southeast Asia, the Middle East, Europe, Europe, Africa, North America, Latin America, and Oceania. However, Bernbaum manages to always attend to the individuality of mountains, and argues against reducing their understanding to a general theory about sacred mountains, even while identifying some common themes and recurrent patterns among them. Besides, the production of the book in large format, glossy paper, and with lots of colour photographs helps bring the subject to life. In 2022, the Cambridge University Press brought out a substantially revised and updated second edition of Sacred Mountains.

The first edition of Sacred Mountains of the World (1990) won the Commonwealth Club of California's gold medal for the best work of non-fiction, and the Guiseppe Mazzotti Special Jury Award in Italy for literature on mountains, exploration, and ecology. It was also the basis of an exhibition of Bernbaum's photographs at the Smithsonian Institution.

== Bibliography ==
=== Books ===
- Bernbaum, Edwin. Sacred mountains of the world. Berkeley. University of California Press, 1997 (first published by Sierra Book Club, 1990).
- Bernbaum, Edwin. Sacred mountains of the world. Updated edition, Cambridge University Press, 2022.
- Bernbaum, Edwin. The Way to Shambhala: A Search for the Mythical Kingdom Beyond the Himalayas. Shambhala Press, 2001 (first published by Anchor Press/Doubleday, 1980).

=== Articles and book chapters ===
- Bernbaum, Edwin. "The way of symbols: The use of symbols in Tibetan mysticism." The Journal of Transpersonal Psychology 6, no. 2 (1974): 93.
- Bernbaum, E. (1981). Wrathful deities [Tibetan myth and religion; plates]. Parabola, 6 (4), 56-61.
- Bernbaum, Edwin. "Sacred Space." The Encyclopedia of Religion. Vol. 12." (1987): 526-535.
- Bernbaum, Edwin. "Sacred mountains." Parabola - Myth, Tradition and the Search for Meaning 13, no. 4 (1988): 12-18.
- Bernbaum, Edwin. "The Himalayas, realm of the sacred." The power of place (1991): 107-119.
- Bernbaum, Edwin. "To Lhasa and Beyond: Diary of the Expedition to Tibet in the Year 1948." The Pacific world 7 (1991): 105-107.
- Bernbaum, Edwin. "Secrets of the sacred hills." People and the Planet 8, no. 5 (1996).
- Bernbaum, Edwin. "Sacred mountains of east Asia and the Pacific region: implications for cultural and environmental preservation." MOUNTAINS OF EAST ASIA AND THE PACIFIC (1996): 2.
- Bernbaum, Edwin. "Sacred mountains: implications for protected area management." Protected Areas Programme. Mountain Protected Areas. IUCN, Gland, Switzerland 6, no. 1 (1996): 41-48.
- Bernbaum, Edwin. "Sacred mountains." UNESCO Courier 50, no. 9 (1997): 34-37.
- Bernbaum, Edwin. "The spiritual and cultural significance of mountains." Mountains of the World-A Global Priority, Parthenon, Oxford, UK (1997).
- Bernbaum, Edwin. "The dancer's sleeve IN: Parabola. Mt. Kisco, NY v. 19, no. 3." (1998).
- Bernbaum, Edwin. "Restoring Shiva's Hair." Natural history 107, no. 1 (1998): 84-84.
- Bernbaum, Edwin. "Mountains: the heights of biodiversity." Cultural and Spiritual Values of Biodiversity, United Nations Environment Programme’s Complementary Contribution to the Global Biodiversity Assessment (1999): 327-343.
- Bernbaum, Edwin. "Badrinath's Trees: Local Forests Being Restored as Pilgrims Now Plant Trees as Offering to God." Hinduism Today, May (1999).
- Bernbaum, Edwin. "Two projects illustrating the role of cultural and spiritual values in restoring and protecting mountain environments." Revue de Géographie Alpine 89, no. 2 (2001): 139-140.
- Bernbaum, E., 2001. Sacred mountains: mountain themes and cultural landscapes. In UNESCO thematic expert meeting on Asia-Pacific sacred mountains. Final report (pp. p-67).
- Bernbaum, Edwin. "Mountains of inspiration." Extreme Landscape: The Lure of Mountain Spaces (2002): 133-53.
- Messerli, Bruno, and Edwin Bernbaum. "The role of culture, education, and science for sustainable mountain development." Key Issues for Mountain Areas (2004): 210-234.
- Bernbaum, Edwin. "Sacred Mountains of the world: An overview." In Conserving Cultural and Biological Diversity: The role of sacred natural sites and cultural landscapes. International Symposium, Japan, vol. 30, pp. 26–33. 2005.
- Bernbaum, Edwin. "Sacred mountains: Themes and teachings." Mountain Research and Development 26, no. 4 (2006): 304-309.
- Bernbaum, Edwin. "The Heights of Inspiration: The Cultural and Spiritual Meaning of Mountains as a Basis for Interpretation and Conservation." Protected Areas and Spirituality: Proceedings of the First Workshop of the Delos Initiative - Monsterrat 2006 (eds. Josep-Maria Mallarach and Thymio Papayannis): 101-112.
- Bernbaum, Edwin. "Peak Paradigms: Mountain Metaphors of Leadership and Teamwork." Wharton Leadership Digest 12, no. 11 (2008).
- Bernbaum, Edwin. "The Spiritual and Cultural Significance of National Parks.(US Department of the State)." National Parks, National Legacy. eJournal USA 17 (2008): 5-8.
- Bernbaum, Edwin. "Sacred mountains and global changes: impacts and responses." In Sacred Natural Sites, pp. 33–41. Routledge, 2012.
- Bernbaum, Edwin. "Sacred mountains and national parks: spiritual and cultural values as a foundation for environmental conservation." Sacred Species and Sites: Advances in Biocultural Conservation (2012): 83-96.
- Bernbaum, Edwin, and Larry W. Price. "Attitudes toward mountains." Mountain geography: Physical and human dimensions (2013): 253-266.
- Bernbaum, Edwin. "Sacred mountains in Asia: Themes and implications for protected areas." In Asian sacred natural sites, pp. 52–62. Routledge, 2016.
- Bernbaum, Edwin. "The cultural and spiritual significance of nature in the management and governance of protected areas." In The George Wright Forum, vol. 34, no. 2, pp. 168–179. George Wright Society, 2017.
- Bernbaum, Edwin. "Sacred mountains." Indigeneity and the sacred: Indigenous revival and the conservation of sacred natural sites in the Americas 22 (2017): 92-104.
- Bernbaum, Edwin. "The spiritual and cultural significance of nature: Inspiring connections between people and parks." Science, Conservation and Parks. University of Chicago Press, Chicago (2017): 294-311.
- Verschuuren, Bas, Josep-Maria Mallarach, and Edwin Bernbaum. "Making the cultural and spiritual significance of nature work for protected areas." Oryx 52, no. 2 (2018): 213-213.
- Mallarach, Josep-Maria, Fabrizio Frascaroli, Will Tuladhar-Douglas, Jonathan Liljeblad, Radhika Borde, Edwin Bernbaum, and Bas Verschuuren. "Implications of the diversity of concepts and values of nature in the management and governance of protected and conserved areas." In Cultural and spiritual significance of nature in protected areas, pp. 21–35. Routledge, 2018.
- Bernbaum, Edwin. "The cultural and spiritual significance of nature: Involving the general public in the management and governance of protected areas." In Cultural and Spiritual Significance of Nature in Protected Areas, pp. 133–146. Routledge, 2018.
- Bernbaum, Edwin, and Bas Verschuuren. "The Cultural and Spiritual Significance of Nature in the Management and Governance of Protected Areas and World Heritage Sites." (2019): 1-18.
- Bernbaum, Edwin, and Bas Verschuuren. "Incorporating Nature and Culture into the Daily Management of Papahānaumokuākea Marine National Monument." (2019): 1-19.
- Verschuuren, Bas, Josep-Maria Mallarach, Edwin Bernbaum, Jeremy Spoon, Steve Brown, Radhika Borde, Jessica Brown et al. Cultural and spiritual significance of nature: guidance for protected and conserved area governance and management. Vol. 32. IUCN, International Union for Conservation of Nature and Natural Resour, 2021.
- Bernbaum, Edwin. "The spiritual and cultural importance of mountains." In Montology Palimpsest: A Primer of Mountain Geographies, pp. 213–224. Cham: Springer International Publishing, 2023.
- Bernbaum, Edwin. "The Sacred Identity of Mountains." In Mountain Lexicon: A Corpus of Montology and Innovation, pp. 69–72. Cham: Springer Nature Switzerland, 2024.
- Sarmiento, Fausto O., and Edwin Bernbaum. "Named and Gendered Mountains." In Mountain Lexicon: A Corpus of Montology and Innovation, pp. 79–87. Cham: Springer Nature Switzerland, 2024.
- Bernbaum, Edwin. "Jon Mathieu, Mount Sacred: A Brief Global History of Holy Mountains Since 1500." Journal for the study of religion, nature and culture 18 (2024): 1-2.
