= Telmo Vargas =

Ecuadorian general

Acting President of Ecuador as Chief of Staff of the Armed Forces
- In office 29 March 1966
- Preceded by: Ramón Castro Jijón
- Succeeded by: Clemente Yerovi

Personal details
- Born: Telmo Oswaldo Vargas Benalcázar; 9 October 1912 San José de Minas, Quito Canton, Ecuador
- Died: 9 August 2013 (aged 100) Quito, Ecuador

Military service
- Allegiance: Ecuador
- Branch/service: Ecuadorian Army
- Rank: General

General Telmo Oswaldo Vargas Benalcázar (9 October 1912 – 9 August 2013) was Chief of Staff of the Armed Forces of Ecuador, who overthrew the military junta of Ramón Castro Jijón on 29 March 1966. After Castro Jijón turned over power to army high command, the high command appointed Clemente Yerovi as president of the civilian junta. As the leader of the army high command, Vargas is considered by some to have briefly served as head of state of Ecuador. He died on 9 August 2013 at the age of 100.

Political offices
Preceded by Ramón Castro Jijón	Head of State of Ecuador as Chief of Staff of the Armed Forces; 1966	Succeeded by Clemente Yerovi
