= Hahn's Shoes =

Defunct American retail company

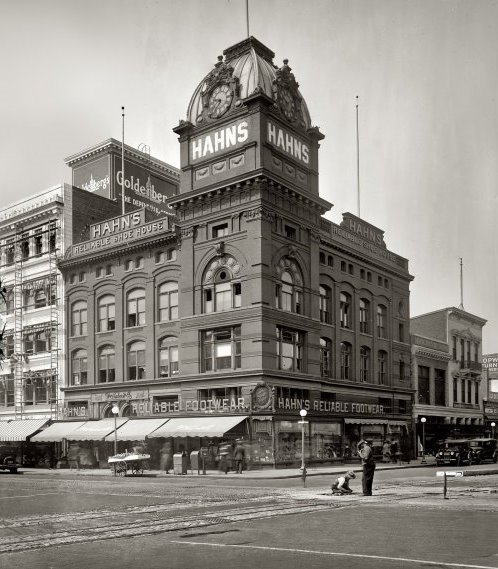
Hahn's Shoe store, Washington DC

Hahn's Shoes was a Washington, DC area shoe store. It was founded in 1876 by William Hahn, who had arrived in the United States from Germany in 1868 at age 15. By 1890, there were three locations: 816 7th St, NW; 1922 Pennsylvania Ave, NW; and 231 Pennsylvania Ave, SE.

== Overview ==
At its peak, Hahn Shoes had 66 stores in 13 states and DC. Three generations of the Hahn family, including the father of DC City Council Chair Gilbert Hahn Jr., managed the business until 1984. William Hahn's granddaughter, Betty Hahn Bernbaum, was a radio operator and ambassador's wife in South America in the mid-twentieth century.

== Bankruptcy ==
Like Rich's and other locally owned shoe stores, Hahn's was unable to keep up with the prices of discount chains and department stores. After 119 years, the business filed for bankruptcy and liquidated in 1995.
