= Betty Hahn Bernbaum =

American writer (1918–2003)

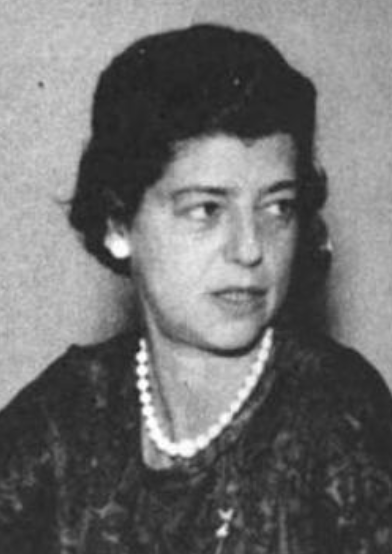
- Betty Bernbaum, from a 1962 publication of the United States Department of State
- Born: Elizabeth R. Hahn; March 20, 1918; Washington, D.C.
- Died: June 20, 2003 (aged 85); Collington, Maryland
- Occupations: Ambassador's wife, writer, ham radio operator
- Spouse: Maurice M. Bernbaum

Elizabeth "Betty" Hahn Bernbaum (March 20, 1918 – June 20, 2003) was an American ambassador's wife and writer. She was called "a ball of diplomatic fire" for her embassy activities. She was decorated by the President of Ecuador for her amateur radio work, and wrote a memoir, Adventures in Latin America: The Life of One Foreign Service Wife (1992).

== Early life ==
Elizabeth R. Hahn was born in Washington, D.C., the daughter of Edwin Hahn and Florentine S. Israel Hahn. Her father was president of Hahn's Shoes. Her cousin Gilbert J. Hahn Jr. was appointed chair of the Washington City Council from 1969 to 1972. She graduated from Wheaton College in 1940.

== Career ==
Bernbaum, called "a ball of diplomatic fire", accompanied her husband when he served as United States ambassador in Ecuador and Venezuela, and at other appointments in Nicaragua and Washington, D.C. In Ecuador she organized embassy wives and worked with the General Federation of Women's Clubs in the US, to provide supplies, books, and furniture to Ecuadorean schools. She also supported orphanages and helped stock libraries with Spanish-language books.

Bernbaum was an amateur radio operator. In 1949, her emergency broadcasts helped direct timely assistance to survivors of the Ambato earthquake, and she received the Order of Merit from Galo Plaza, the President of Ecuador, for her lifesaving radio work. "For six days and nights, she manned an amateur radio station and summoned doctors, nurses, and medical supplies when the commercial stations had been disrupted," explained one account. In 1965 she became the first American to hold a Venezuelan radio license. Her radio skills were again helpful in emergency communications after the 1967 earthquake in Caracas. She won a prize in the 1969 McFall Manuscript Contest for an essay about her radio station.

She was a member of the Committee on Education in the American Foreign Service Association. She wrote Adventures in Latin America: The Life of One Foreign Service Wife (1992) about her experiences as a diplomat's wife.

== Personal life ==
Hahn married foreign service officer Maurice M. Bernbaum in 1942. They had two children, Louise and Edwin. She died in 2003, at the age of 85, in Collington, Maryland.
