= Maurice M. Bernbaum =

American Career Foreign Service Officer

Maurice Marshall Bernbaum (1910– March 8, 2008) was an American Career Foreign Service Officer who served as Ambassador Extraordinary and Plenipotentiary to Ecuador (1960–1965) and Venezuela (1965–1969).

Bernbaum graduated from Harvard University in 1931. He passed the Foreign Service exam in 1936 and later that year, became Vice Counsul in Vancouver.

During his tenure as Ambassador to Ecuador, their President Carlos Julio Arosemena Monroy was overthrown by the Military Junta of 1963 after criticizing the US government and insulting Bernbaum. His wife Betty Hahn Bernbaum was an amateur radio operator and philanthropist, whose emergency work after the 1949 Ambato earthquake and 1967 Caracas earthquake was widely publicized.
