= 1966 Ecuadorian Constitutional Assembly election =

Constitutional Assembly elections were held in Ecuador on 16 October 1966, following a coup d'état the previous year.

== Results ==
Party	Votes	%
Conservative Party	197,279	34.24
Ecuadorian Radical Liberal Party	118,188	20.51
Pontista Federation	113,205	19.65
Independent Republican Movement	72,344	12.56
Arosemenista National Movement	26,870	4.66
Others	48,227	8.37
Total	576,113	100.00
Valid votes	576,113	90.97
Invalid/blank votes	57,171	9.03
Total votes	633,284	100.00
Source: Nohlen
