= Military Government of Veracruz =

Occupation of Veracruz by the United States

Military Government of Veracruz Gobierno Militar de Veracruz (Spanish)
- Occupied territory of the United States
- 1914
- Flag of the United States

Anthem
- Salve, Columbia "Hail, Columbia"
- Government
  - Type: Military Government
  - Motto: E Pluribus Unum "Out of Many, One"
- Military Governor
  - 1914: Frederick Funston
- Historical era: Modern Era
  - Established: April 21, 1914
  - U.S. withdrawal: November 23, 1914
- Today part of: Mexico

The Military Government of Veracruz (Spanish: Gobierno Militar de Veracruz) was a provisional military government established during the American occupation of Veracruz in 1914 that lasted from April 21 to November 23.

== Occupation ==
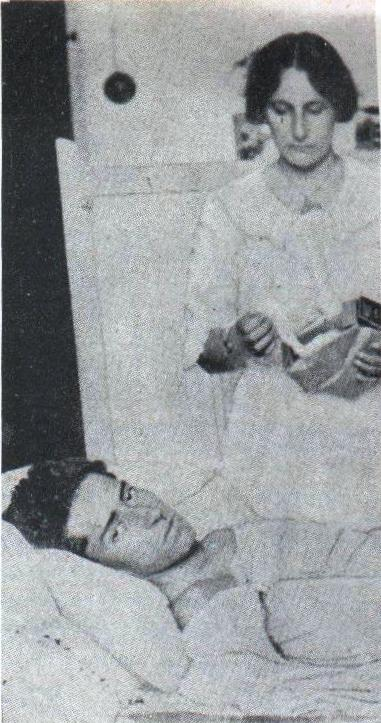
José Azueta is considered a Mexican hero for his actions during the Battle of Veracruz

U.S. Army Brigadier General Frederick Funston was placed in control of the administration of the port. Assigned to his staff as an intelligence officer was a young Captain Douglas MacArthur.

Mexican President Victoriano Huerta was not able to respond to the U.S. invasion due to his preoccupation with the Mexican Revolution. He had to contend with numerous revolts across his country, the most notable of which were led in Chihuahua by Pancho Villa and in the state of Morelos by Emiliano Zapata. Venustiano Carranza, previously an ally of the federal government, also revolted against Huerta in Coahuila, the state where he was formerly governor. These rebellions eventually culminated in the Battle of Zacatecas on the 24th of June, 1914, where the Federal army lost 5,000 soldiers. The result was instrumental in bringing about Huerta's resignation.

The occupation brought the United States and Mexico to the brink of war and worsened relations between the two countries for many years. Argentina, Brazil, and Chile, who at the time were negotiating the ABC pact, a proposed economic and political treaty to prevent conflict in South America, held the Niagara Falls peace conference in Niagara Falls, Ontario, Canada, on May 20 to avoid an all-out war over this incident and to prevent American hegemony over the region. A plan was formed in June for the U.S. troops to withdraw from Veracruz after General Huerta surrendered the reins of his government to a new regime and Mexico assured the United States that it would receive no indemnity for its losses in the recent chaotic events. Huerta soon afterwards left office and gave his government to Carranza. Carranza, who was still quite unhappy with U.S. troops occupying Veracruz, rejected the rest of the agreement. In November 1914, after the Convention of Aguascalientes ended and Carranza failed to resolve his differences with revolutionary generals Pancho Villa and Emiliano Zapata, Carranza left office for a short period and handed control to Eulalio Gutiérrez Ortiz.

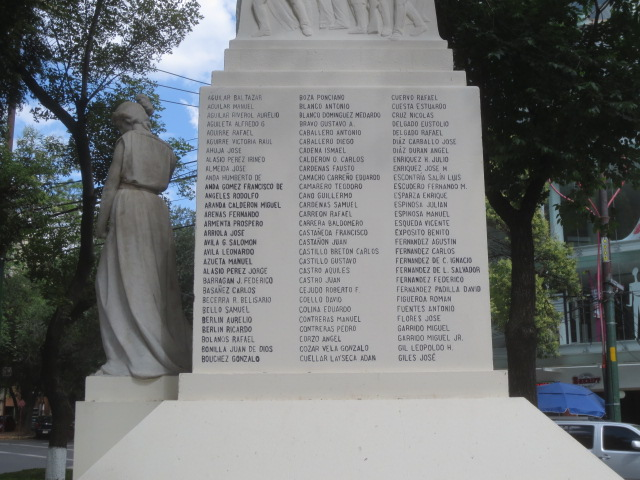
"Defensores de Veracruz en 1914" Memorial in Mexico City. This monument celebrates the Mexican defenders of Veracruz.

During this brief absence from power, however, Carranza still controlled Veracruz and Tamaulipas. After leaving Mexico City, Carranza fled to the state of Veracruz, made the city of Cordoba the capital of his regime and agreed to accept the rest of the terms of Niagara Falls peace plan. The U.S. troops officially departed on November 23. Despite their previous spat, diplomatic ties between the U.S. and the Carranza regime greatly extended, following the departure of U.S. troops from Veracruz.

After the fighting ended, U.S. Secretary of the Navy Josephus Daniels ordered that fifty-six Medals of Honor be awarded to participants in this action, the most for any single action before or since. This amount was half as many as had been awarded for the Spanish–American War, and close to half the number that would be awarded during World War I and the Korean War. A critic claimed that the excess medals were awarded by lot. Major Smedley Butler, a recipient of one of the nine Medals of Honor awarded to Marines, later tried to return it, being incensed at this "unutterable foul perversion of Our Country's greatest gift" and claiming he had done nothing heroic. The Department of the Navy told him to not only keep it, but wear it.

The controversy surrounding the Veracruz Medals of Honor led to stricter standards for the awarding of the Medal of Honor and the establishment of lower ranking medals to recognize a wider range of accomplishments.

Mexico's Naval Lt. Azueta and a Naval Military School cadet, Cadet Midshipman Virgilio Uribe, who died during the fighting, are now part of the roll call of honor read by all branches of the Mexican Armed Forces in all military occasions, alongside the six Niños Héroes of the Military College (nowadays the Heroic Military Academy) who died in defense of the nation during the Battle of Chapultepec on September 13, 1847. As a result of the brave defense put up by the Naval School cadets and faculty, it has now become the Heroic Naval Military School of Mexico in their honor by virtue of a congressional resolution in 1949.

== Political consequences ==
As an immediate reaction to the military invasion of Veracruz several anti-U.S. riots broke out in Mexico, Argentina, Chile, Costa Rica, Ecuador, Guatemala, and Uruguay. U.S. citizens were expelled from Mexican territory and some had to be accommodated in refugee campuses at New Orleans, Texas City, and San Diego. Even the British government was privately irritated, because they had previously agreed with Woodrow Wilson that the United States would not invade Mexico without prior warning. The military invasion of Veracruz was also a decisive factor in favor of keeping Mexico neutral in World War I. Mexico refused to participate with the United States in its military excursion in Europe and guaranteed German companies they could keep their operations open, especially in Mexico City. Nevertheless, the tension between the U.S. and Mexico was great enough that the German government offered to help Mexico reconquer territory lost to the U.S. in the Mexican American war in exchange for Mexican soldiers to help Germany in World War I. The Mexican government refused this offer.

U.S. president Woodrow Wilson considered another military invasion of Veracruz and Tampico in 1917–1918, so as to take control of Tehuantepec Isthmus and Tampico oil fields, but this time the new Mexican President Venustiano Carranza gave the order to destroy the oil fields in case the Marines tried to land there. As a scholar once wrote: "Carranza may not have fulfilled the social goals of the revolution, but he kept the gringos out of Mexico City".
