= Ramón Castro Jijón =

President of Ecuador (1963–1966)

Acting President of Ecuador Chairman of Military Junta
- In office 11 July 1963 – 29 March 1966
- Preceded by: Carlos Julio Arosemena Monroy
- Succeeded by: Telmo Vargas

Personal details
- Born: 15 November 1915 Esmeraldas, Ecuador
- Died: 1 November 1984 (aged 68) Quito, Ecuador

Military service
- Branch/service: Ecuadorian Navy
- Rank: Commander

Admiral Ramón Castro Jijón (15 November 1915 – 1 November 1984) was President of Ecuador from 11 July 1963 to 29 March 1966. He was appointed commander of the Ecuadorian Navy by Carlos Julio Arosemena Monroy, whom he later overthrew in a coup. For his entire term as President he was chairman of a military junta.

Political offices
Preceded by Carlos Julio Arosemena Monroy	President of Ecuador; 1963–1966	Succeeded by Telmo Vargas
