= 1963 Ecuadorian coup d'état =

Military overthrow of Julio Arosemena

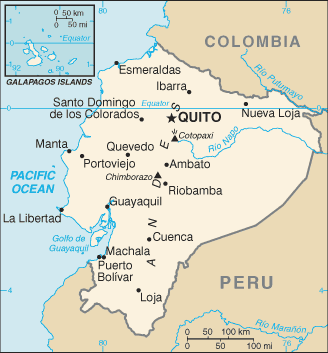
Date	July 11, 1963
Location	Ecuador
Result	Coup attempt successful: Formation of anti-Communist military junta; Outlawing of Communist parties; Restoration to civilian rule in 1966

Belligerents
Armed Forces of Ecuador	(Ecuador) Dissenting faction of the armed forces

Commanders and leaders
(Ecuador) Carlos Julio Arosemena Monroy	(Ecuador) Ramón Castro Jijón (Ecuador) Aurelio Naranjo (Ecuador) Naftali Ponce Miranda

The 1963 Ecuadorian coup d'état was the successful government takeover in Ecuador of the military against the democratic administration of Carlos Julio Arosemena Monroy, establishing a four-man military junta led by Ramon Castro Jijon. The junta ruled the country until 1966, when it was overthrown in another coup d'état by the High Command of the Armed Forces.

Motives behind the coup d'état included dissatisfaction with President Arosemena's perceived over-friendliness with communists, concerns over potential misrule by either of the two presidential candidates in the upcoming election, and the perceived threat from communists and socialists. President Arosemena's criticism of U.S. foreign policy also contributed to his overthrow.

== History ==
On July 11, 1963, the Ecuadorian military staged a near-bloodless coup that resulted in the overthrow of the government and the exile of both President Arosemena and Vice President Varea. The military junta that took power, composed of Rear Admiral Ramón Castro Jijón, Colonel Aurelio Naranjo, and Naftali Ponce Miranda. In the immediate aftermath, the military junta proclaimed martial law and the outlawing of the Communist Party of Ecuador (PCE), along with the detention of top PCE party officials.

During the three-year-long rule of the junta, they supported agro-exporters and relied on debt financing and import-substitution industrialization. Significant financial aid from USAID was also given. While trying to meet the criteria needed to secure loans from the World Bank, the junta raised gasoline taxes, increased electricity rates, and cut jobs in the country's state enterprises.

Despite reducing public expenditure by 16% in 1963, the country's public finances remained weak. Tax breaks for foreign companies also caused the budget deficit to soar from S/. 250 million in 1963 to S/. 630 million in 1964, reaching S/. 1.2 billion by 1965. Public debt rose to US$163 million by the end of 1964, and economic growth slowed down due to declines in banana, coffee, and cacao exports.

By 1966, the junta faced significant opposition due to its unpopular austerity measures and failure to transition to civilian rule, leading to widespread demonstrations across Quito and Guayaquil. Continued unrest led the junta to step down and cede power to an interim coalition government led by Clemente Yerovi in 1966.
