= Carlos Julio Arosemena Monroy =

Ecuadorian politician

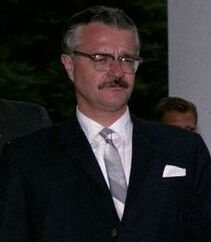

31st President of Ecuador
- In office 7 November 1961 – 11 July 1963
- Vice President: Reynaldo Varea
- Preceded by: José María Velasco Ibarra
- Succeeded by: Ramón Castro Jijón

Vice President of Ecuador
- In office 1 September 1960 – 7 November 1961
- President: José María Velasco Ibarra
- Preceded by: Francisco Illingworth Icaza
- Succeeded by: Reinaldo Varea Donoso

Personal details
- Born: Carlos Julio Arosemena Monroy; 24 August 1919 Guayaquil, Ecuador
- Died: 5 March 2004 (aged 84) Guayaquil, Ecuador
- Party: National Velasquista Federation
- Spouse: Gladys Peet Landin (m. 1946) (1923-2015)
- Children: 7
- Education: University of Guayaquil

Carlos Julio Arosemena Monroy (24 August 1919 – 5 March 2004) was an Ecuadorian politician. Arosemena Monroy was elected as Vice President of Ecuador in 1960 and due to the ousting of President José María Velasco Ibarra, became President of Ecuador from 7 November 1961 to 11 July 1963.

== Biography ==
He was born in Guayaquil to Carlos Julio Arosemena Tola, a former president of Ecuador, and Laura Monroy Garaycoa. He was President of the Chamber of Deputies in 1952. As Vice President, he was also President of the Senate.

He exercises his mandate in a tumultuous regional context, caused by the Cuban revolution and the establishment of anti-communist military dictatorships in Latin America. During his presidency, he modernized the telecommunications network, created the national aviation company TAME and the Secular and Catholic University of Guayaquil, launched road construction work in the country and introduced the thirteenth month's salary. His support of Fidel Castro's revolution in Cuba caused an ongoing conflict with Congress and the military.

While in office, there were two failed attempts to impeach him. He was overthrown by the Military Junta of 1963 after criticizing the US government and insulting Maurice M. Bernbaum, the US ambassador to Ecuador.

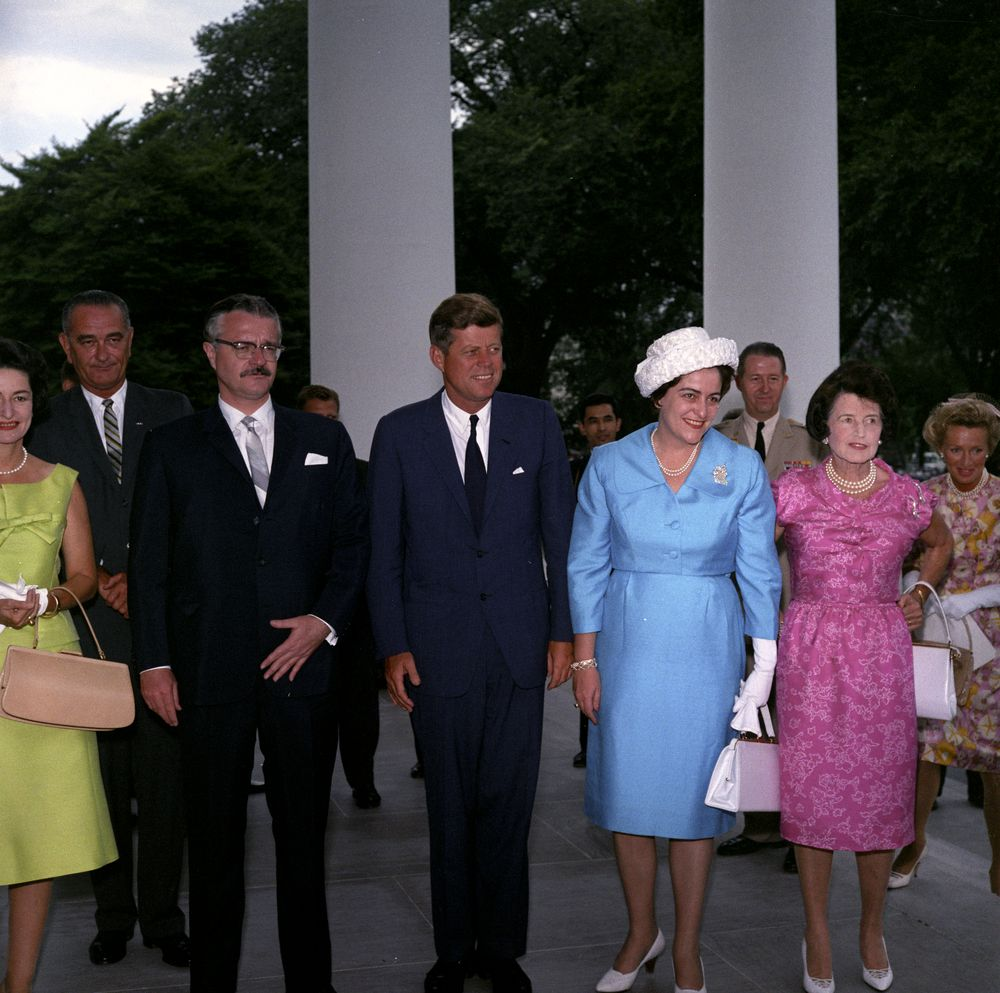
Carlos Julio Arosemena Monroy with John F. Kennedy, 35th president of the United States, during a visit to the United States

Political offices
Preceded by Francisco Illingworth	Vice President of Ecuador; 1960–1961	Succeeded by Reinaldo Varea
Preceded by José María Velasco Ibarra	President of Ecuador; 1961–1963	Succeeded by Ramón Castro Jijón
