= Clemente Yerovi =

Ecuadorian politician and interim president (1904-1981)

Clemente Yerovi Indaburu
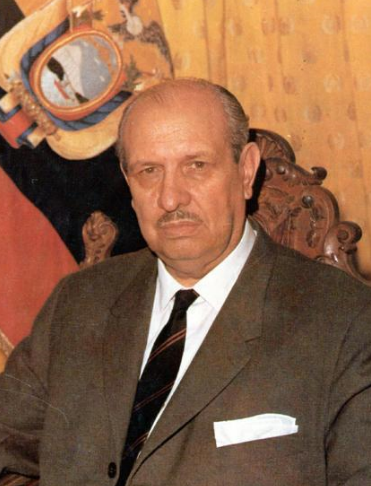

Interim President of Ecuador
- In office 30 March 1966 – 16 November 1966
- Preceded by: Telmo Vargas
- Succeeded by: Otto Arosemena

Personal details
- Born: Clemente Yerovi Indaburu; 10 August 1904 Barcelona, Spain
- Died: 19 July 1981 (aged 76) Guayaquil, Ecuador
- Cause of death: Heart failure
- Spouse: Victoria Gómez Ycaza (1908-1976)
- Children: 4
- Parents: Clemente Yerovi Matheus; María Indabaru Seminario

Clemente Yerovi Indaburu (10 August 1904 – 19 July 1981) was a politician and the interim president of Ecuador from 30 March 1966, to 16 November 1966.

Yerovi was born in Barcelona, Spain, where his parents Clemente Yerovi Matheus and María Indaburu Seminario lived temporarily as consul general of Ecuador. Yerovi studied at Vicente Rocafuerte High School in Guayaquil, and then at San Gabriel High School in Quito. He married Victoria Gómez Ycaza and had four children, who were named:

- María Laura Yerovi Gómez
- Elena Yerovi Gómez
- Clemente Yerovi Gómez
- Fernando Yerovi Gómez

He had many links to agriculture on the coast of the country, where he acquired a farm, that split in parts among its workers. Yerovi tenure is remembered by most Ecuadorians as a time of peace and prosperity. Even though Yerovi was not elected by popular vote, Ecuadorians are very fond of his persona, erecting many monuments and naming avenues with his name.

In 1948 he was economy minister of Galo Plaza's government, and then senator for agriculture.

Yerovi died in Guayaquil, Ecuador.

Political offices
Preceded by Telmo Vargas	President of Ecuador; 1966	Succeeded by Otto Arosemena
