= Alfredo Poveda =

Interim President of Ecuador from 1976 to 1979

Head of the Supreme Government Council
- In office January 11, 1976 – August 10, 1979
- Preceded by: Guillermo Rodríguez
- Succeeded by: Jaime Roldós (as President)

Personal details
- Born: Alfredo Ernesto Poveda Burbano; January 24, 1926 Ambato, Tungurahua, Ecuador
- Died: June 7, 1990 (aged 64) Miami, Florida, U.S.
- Spouse: Alicia Pizzimbono (m. 1950)
- Children: 4

Military service
- Allegiance: Ecuador
- Branch: Ecuadorian Navy
- Rank: Admiral

Alfredo Ernesto Poveda Burbano (January 24, 1926 – June 7, 1990) was an Interim President of Ecuador January 11, 1976, to August 10, 1979.

== Background ==
Poveda was born in Ambato on January 24, 1926. He attended Mejía High School in Quito and the Escuela Superior Naval "Comandante Rafael Morán Valverde" and graduated from the Escuela Nacional de Náutica Manuel Belgrano (ESNN). He also attended military academies in Argentina, Brazil, and the United States.

== Career ==
Poveda first served in the Ecuadorian navy where he was promoted as the naval attaché at Ecuadorian missions to Western European countries. He became commander of the First Naval Zone and commander of the Marine Infantry Battalion.

=== Junta leader ===
Poveda came to power through a military coup in 1976 and was appointed by the Supreme Council of Government as president. He governed with two other members, General Guillermo Durán Arcentales (for the Ecuadorian Army) and General Luis Leoro Franco (for the Ecuadorian Air Force). The triumvirate structured a plan for return to democratic government that led to multiparty general elections after a referendum on a choice of constitutions between a new one created by a constitutional assembly appointed by the Triumvirate and the Constitution of 1948 with several reforms. The new constitution was adopted in 1979 and it was recognized as a progressive document. The referendum lead to multi-party general elections among some twenty recognized political parties and the populist lawyer from Guayaquil Jaime Roldós Aguilera was elected President of Ecuador.

The military government was known for its crackdown of dissent and was particularly noted for its handling of the October 1977 sugar workers' strike at El Aztra, which resulted to the death of 100 individuals in what became known as the Aztra massacre. The regime also withdrew land reform in the same year while all pending land cases were concluded in favor of landowners.

== Later years ==
Upon returning to a democratic system, Admiral Poveda withdrew from public life and took up residence in Guayaquil, Ecuador. On June 7, 1990, while undergoing medical treatment at Mount Sinai Hospital, he died from a myocardial infarction in Miami, Florida.

Political offices
Preceded by Guillermo Rodríguez	President of Ecuador; 1976–1979	Succeeded by Jaime Roldós
