= Osvaldo Zavala Giler =

Ecuadorian jurist

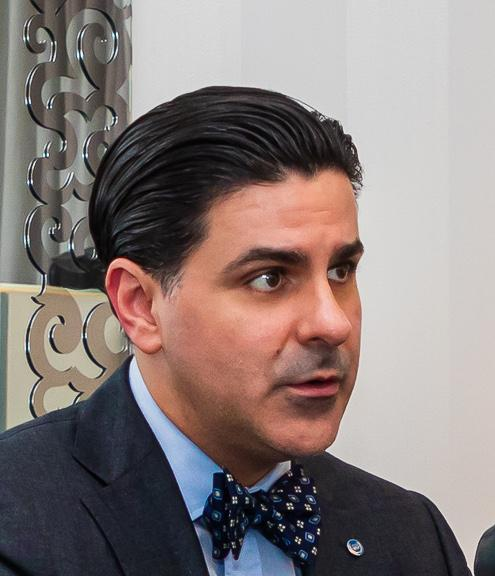
- Osvaldo Zavala Giler (2024)

Registrar of the International Criminal Court
- Incumbent
- Assumed office 17 April 2023
- Preceded by: Peter Lewis

Personal details
- Born: Ecuador
- Education: Universidad Católica de Santiago de Guayaquil
- Occupation: Jurist

Osvaldo Zavala Giler (born 1978/1979) is an Ecuadorian jurist. He has been the registrar of the International Criminal Court (ICC) since 17 April 2023 and has a five-year mandate.

== Early life and career ==
Zavala Giler was born as son of Osvaldo Zavala Egas. He is a grandson of Jorge Zavala. Zavala Giler obtained an interest in criminal law and human rights from his grandfather, of whom he has stated was a large influence in his life.

Zavala Giler obtained a bachelor's degree in social and political science at the Universidad Católica de Santiago de Guayaquil. He obtained a law degree at the same university. From 2000 to 2003 he worked at the law firm of his grandfather in Ecuador. He started working there from the third year of university. During this time he also worked on cases before the Inter-American Commission on Human Rights. In 2004 he went to the Netherlands where he studied international criminal law at the University of Amsterdam. In October 2005 he started an internship at the Coalition for the International Criminal Court. Between 2006 and 2010 he worked for the organization as a legal advisor, legal officer and liaison to the United Nations.

== Career at the International Criminal Court ==
In 2010 Zavala Giler started working as a special assistant to the registrar, then Silvana Arbia. He held this position until 2016 and also worked under Herman von Hebel. From 2016 to 2022 he was senior special assistant and thus also worked under Peter Lewis. From 2018 to 2019 Zavala Giler also functioned as Head of Office of the ICC's liaison office to the United Nations. From 2022 to 2023 he was head of the Budget Section of the ICC.

On 10 February 2023 he was elected Registrar by an absolute majority of the judges of the ICC in a secret ballot. He was chosen among twelve candidates. Zavala Giler was sworn in on 5 April 2023. On 17 April 2023 he started his five-year mandate, succeeding Peter Lewis. Being the fifth registrar, he is the first non-European registrar of the court. Zavala Giler stated that his goal as registrar was to: "build the ICC as a model of modern public administration that ensures effectiveness and safeguards accountability" and he saw the court's legitimacy being continuously at stake as the largest challenge.

In May 2023 Zavala Giler together with ICC President Piotr Hofmański met with Ukrainian President Volodymyr Zelenskyy, who praised the court for its work in relation to the International Criminal Court arrest warrants for Vladimir Putin and Maria Lvova-Belova.

== Personal life ==
Zavala Giler is from Guayaquil. He has a husband.

Legal offices
Preceded by Peter Lewis	Registrar of the International Criminal Court; 2023–present	Incumbent
