= El Carnavalazo =

1972 military coup in Ecuador

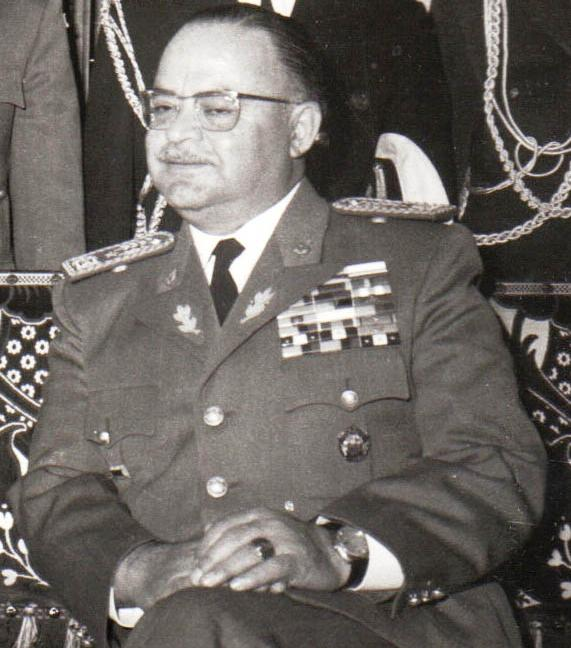
- General Guillermo Rodríguez Lara in 1973.
Date	15 February 1972
Location	Ecuador
Result	Successful coup: End of the Velasquism.; Cancellation of the 1972 Ecuadorian general election; Military governments controls the country until 1979.

Belligerents
(Ecuador) Ecuadorian government	Armed Forces of Ecuador

Commanders and leaders
José María Velasco Ibarra	Guillermo Rodríguez Lara

El Carnavalazo was a military coup in Ecuador led by Guillermo Rodríguez Lara that deposed the government of José María Velasco Ibarra on 15 February 1972, ending the fifth and last of the Velasquist presidencies. This event was popularly called "Carnavalazo" because it happened during the Ecuadorian carnival.

== Background ==
In the 1968 general election José María Velasco Ibarra was democratically elected for a fifth term (1968–1972) as President of Ecuador. Democratic rule did not last long, with Velasco assuming dictatorial powers with military support in 1970 by suspending Congress and ruling by decree.

A failed military coup against his regime took place in 1971, causing Velasco to appoint Guillermo Rodríguez "El Bombita" Lara as the new army commander. In the same year, President Velasco promulgated the Hydrocarbons Law, which declared oil to be a national state patrimony, increased the royalties owed to the state, and regulated foreign oil companies' operations.

In this political crisis, Velasco's regime promised elections for June 1972, which would make his mandate end on August 31. One of the likely candidates was the former mayor of Guayaquil, Assad Bucaram, considered the favorite candidate. The imminent oil boom and prospect of the immense revenues resulting from it sparked planning of a coup by the military, which did not want these oil riches managed by a populist candidate or the traditional oligarchy.

== Coup ==
Publicly, 1972 began peacefully, with Velasco and army chief Bombita celebrating a new year with a toast. National debates took place about two topics: the possible triumph of Assad Bucaram in the elections and the country's oil future. In early February 1972, plans to overthrow Velasco during Carnival circulated among military circles.

According to Rodrigo Rivadeneira, one of Velasco's aides-de-camp, he personally notified Velasco on February 13, the Sunday before the beginning of Lent, while Velasco was in Ambato, that the military intended to remove him from power. Velasco indignantly rejected the demand, telling Rivadeneira that he should tell Rodríguez Lara that "if he wants power, he should come and take it from me, and I will leave in protest."

Velasco returned to Quito the next day, then on February 15, Shrove Tuesday, went to Guayaquil to deliver a televised address. According to Rivadeneira, Velasco was, however, unable to deliver the speech he intended to give without the mass audience he was accustomed to speaking to and asked to be allowed to return in an hour. When he returned to the Palacio de Carondelet, he discovered, however, that the coup had already proceeded; he was arrested and deported to Panama the next day.

After the coup, a three‐man junta called the Revolutionary Nationalist Government was established. Most Ecuadorian citizens were not aware of the coup at the time, as radio stations only played music and three TV stations from Guayaquil went off the air.

== See also ==
- Supreme Council of Government
