= Carlos Julio Arosemena Tola =

28th President of Ecuador

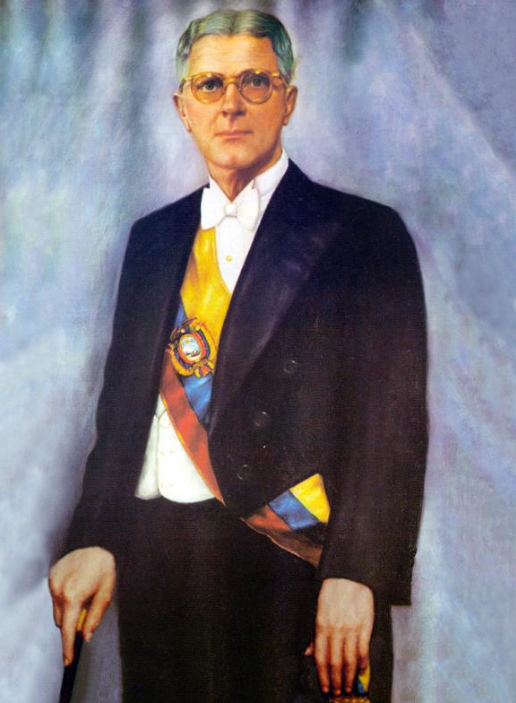

28th President of Ecuador
- In office 16 September 1947 – 31 August 1948
- Vice President: José Rafael Bustamante
- Preceded by: Mariano Suárez
- Succeeded by: Galo Plaza

Vice President of Ecuador
- In office 16 September 1947 – 16 September 1947
- President: Mariano Suárez
- Preceded by: Mariano Suárez
- Succeeded by: José Rafael Bustamante

Personal details
- Born: 12 April 1888 Guayaquil, Ecuador
- Died: 20 February 1952 (aged 63) Guayaquil, Ecuador
- Cause of death: Stroke
- Spouse: Laura Monroy Garaycoa (m. 1915) (1898-1993)
- Children: 7 including Carlos Julio Arosemena Monroy

Carlos Julio Arosemena Tola (12 April 1888 in Guayaquil – 20 February 1952) was President of Ecuador 16 September 1947 to 1 September 1948. He was also the father of future president Carlos Julio Arosemena Monroy.

== Early life ==
Carlos Julio Arosemena Tola was born in Guayaquil on 12 April 1888. He was founder of the Discount Bank in Guayaquil in 1920, being its Manager until 20 February 1952. Principal Director of the Board of Charities of Guayaquil, President of LEA, Executive Director of the Guayas Road Committee.

== Presidency ==
He assumed power during a political crisis, after the overthrowal of José María Velasco Ibarra by Carlos Mancheno Cajas, who did not exercise power for a long time due to pressure from the Military High Command, who favored the constitutional order, giving power to Mariano Suárez Veintimilla, who was the Vice President of Velasco Ibarra, and immediately convened an Extraordinary Congress to elect the new president and vice president, resulting in Arosemena being constitutionally elected as vice president, but immediately assuming as Constitutional President, according to what the Constitution of the time ruled, as Mariano Suárez presented his resignation immediately after Arosemena's inauguration as Vice President. José Rafael Bustamante was elected the same day as Vice President.

The president and vice president complemented each other: good judgment and balance were the strong of Arosemena Tola, convictions of freedom and natural talent were the strong of Bustamante. Both imposed the task of fostering openness in the international relations, adapting the economy to the post-war world situation and combating political cannibalism. The Government of Arosemena Tola was consistent with its bourgeois origin, with the cosmopolitan spirit of the upper class in Guayaquil and with the growing influence of the United States, the great Western winner in the Second War: Arosemena broke relations with the Soviet Union, signed the Charter of the Organization of American States and inaugurated the First Grand Colombian Economic Conference, whose final document, the Charter of Quito, was the antecedent of what would be called the Andean Pact.

Arosemena Tola promulgated on 13 March 1948 the Monetary Regime Law, a substitute for the Organic Law of the Central Bank. The new law put the Central Bank under the direction of the Monetary Board that should design the monetary, credit and exchange policy. He arranged for national production to support the currency and that gold reserves serve to determine the international parity of the sucre. This law, advised by the Triffin Mission of the International Monetary Fund, responded to the conditions of the post-war economy.

The task of combating cannibalism was put to the test in the presidential campaign that the Government prepared carefully. The Supreme Electoral Tribunal (TSE), autonomous with respect to the Ministry of Government, could already operate. The TSE worked well.

== Personal life ==
On 30 December 1915 he married Laura Monroy Garaycoa, 1 a young woman ten years younger than him and who was a great-granddaughter of the independence hero Lorenzo de Garaycoa. 2 The couple have a long progeny, with seven children namely: 2 3

- María Laura Arosemena Monroy. Married to Carlos Gangotena and Fernández Salvador, with offspring.
- Leticia Arosemena Monroy. Married to Guillermo José Arosemena Coronel, with offspring.
- María de Jesús Arosemena Monroy.
- Carlos Julio Arosemena Monroy . Married to Gladys Peet Landin, with offspring.
- Eduardo Arosemena Monroy. Married to Genoveva Gómez Lince, with offspring.
- Gustavo Arosemena Monroy.
- Beatriz Graciela Arosemena Monroy. Married to Juan José Orrantia González, with offspring.

His son Carlos Julio also became president of the Republic. While one of his nephews, Otto Arosemena Gómez, held the same position years later he married.

Political offices
Preceded by Mariano Suárez	President of Ecuador; 1947–1948	Succeeded by Galo Plaza
