= 1972 Ecuadorian general election =

Cancelled election in Ecuador

Elections were scheduled to be held in Ecuador on June 4, 1972. President José María Velasco Ibarra, who was elected in the 1968 presidential election, suspended the constitution in 1970 and took dictatorial powers but announced that regular elections would still be held in 1972. However, the military, which backed Velasco Ibarra's regime, did not think they had a suitable candidate who could defeat Assad Bucaram, leader of the CFP. On February 15, 1972, the military overthrew Velasco Ibarra, cancelled the election and installed General Guillermo Rodríguez Lara as dictator.
