= Timeline of strikes in 1977 =

Strikes in 1977

A number of labour strikes, labour disputes, and other industrial actions occurred in 1977.

== Background ==
A labour strike is a work stoppage caused by the mass refusal of employees to work. This can include wildcat strikes, which are done without union authorisation, and slowdown strikes, where workers reduce their productivity while still carrying out minimal working duties. It is usually a response to employee grievances, such as low pay or poor working conditions. Strikes can also occur to demonstrate solidarity with workers in other workplaces or pressure governments to change policies.

== Timeline ==
=== Continuing strikes from 1976 ===
- Grunwick dispute
- 1976–77 Palestinian prisoners' protests, series of protests and strikes by Palestinians in Israeli custody.
- 1975–80 Sonacotra rent strike, rent strike by immigrant workers in France.

=== February ===
- 1977 British Leyland strike, 4-week strike by British Leyland toolmakers.
- 1977 Malta bread strike

=== March ===
- 1977 Atlanta sanitation strike, strike by sanitation workers in Atlanta, United States, over wages.

=== April ===
- 1977 Australian air traffic controllers' strike
- Coors strike and boycott
- 1977 Singapore Metal Box Workers Union strike

=== May ===
- 1977–78 Indonesia student protests, including strikes, against the dictatorship of Suharto.
- 1977–79 Wien Air Alaska strike, 22-month strike by Wien Air Alaska pilots.

=== June ===
- 1977 Chicago gravediggers' strike, 55-day strike by cemetery workers in Chicago, United States.
- 1977 Chilean hunger strike, strike by relatives of detainees disappeared by the Military dictatorship of Chile held in the headquarters of the United Nations Economic Commission for Latin America and the Caribbean.

=== July ===
- 1977 Peruvian general strike, es

=== August ===
- 1977 Aruba general strike, 1-week general strike in Aruba for independence from the Netherlands Antilles.
- 1977 Canadian air traffic controllers' strike
- Jiu Valley miners' strike of 1977, strike by coal miners in the Jiu Valley, Socialist Republic of Romania.
- 1977 Latrobe Valley power strike, strike by electrical workers in the Latrobe Valley, Australia.
- 1977 Spanish hotel strike

=== September ===
- 1977 UK bread strike, strike by bakery workers in the United Kingdom.

=== October ===
- 1977 Argentina rail strike
- Strike by Aztra engenho workers in Ecuador, resulting in the Aztra massacre.
- 1977–78 Lockheed strike, 12-week strike by Lockheed Corporation workers in the United States.
- 1977 United States longshoremen strike, organised by the International Longshoremen's Association.

=== November ===
- 1977–78 British firemen's strike, the first nationwide strike by firefighters in the United Kingdom, over wages.

=== December ===
- 1977–78 Maharashtra public sector strike, 54-day strike by Maharashtra government workers.
- 1977 TAP Air Portugal strike, 8-day strike by TAP Air Portugal pilots over wages.
- UMW Bituminous coal strike of 1977–1978, 110-day nationwide strike by coal miners in the United States.
- Willmar 8, strike by eight women bank workers in Willmar, Minnesota over discrimination.
