= Supreme Council of Government =

The Supreme Council of Government (Spanish: Consejo Supremo de Gobierno) was a military junta which, de facto, exercised the role of head of state and head of government of the Republic of Ecuador from 1976 to 1979, being considered the last military dictatorship in the history of Ecuador.

Formed following the ousting of dictator Guillermo Rodríguez (who seized power in the 1972 military coup), the Council consisted of three members, representing each branch of the Armed Forces: Admiral Alfredo Poveda as representative of the Navy and President of the Council, Divisional General Guillermo Durán Arcentales as representative of the Army and General Luis Leoro Franco as representative of the Air Force.

== See also ==
- 1978 Ecuadorian constitutional referendum
- 1978–79 Ecuadorian general election
