= Bruno Cathala =

French judge

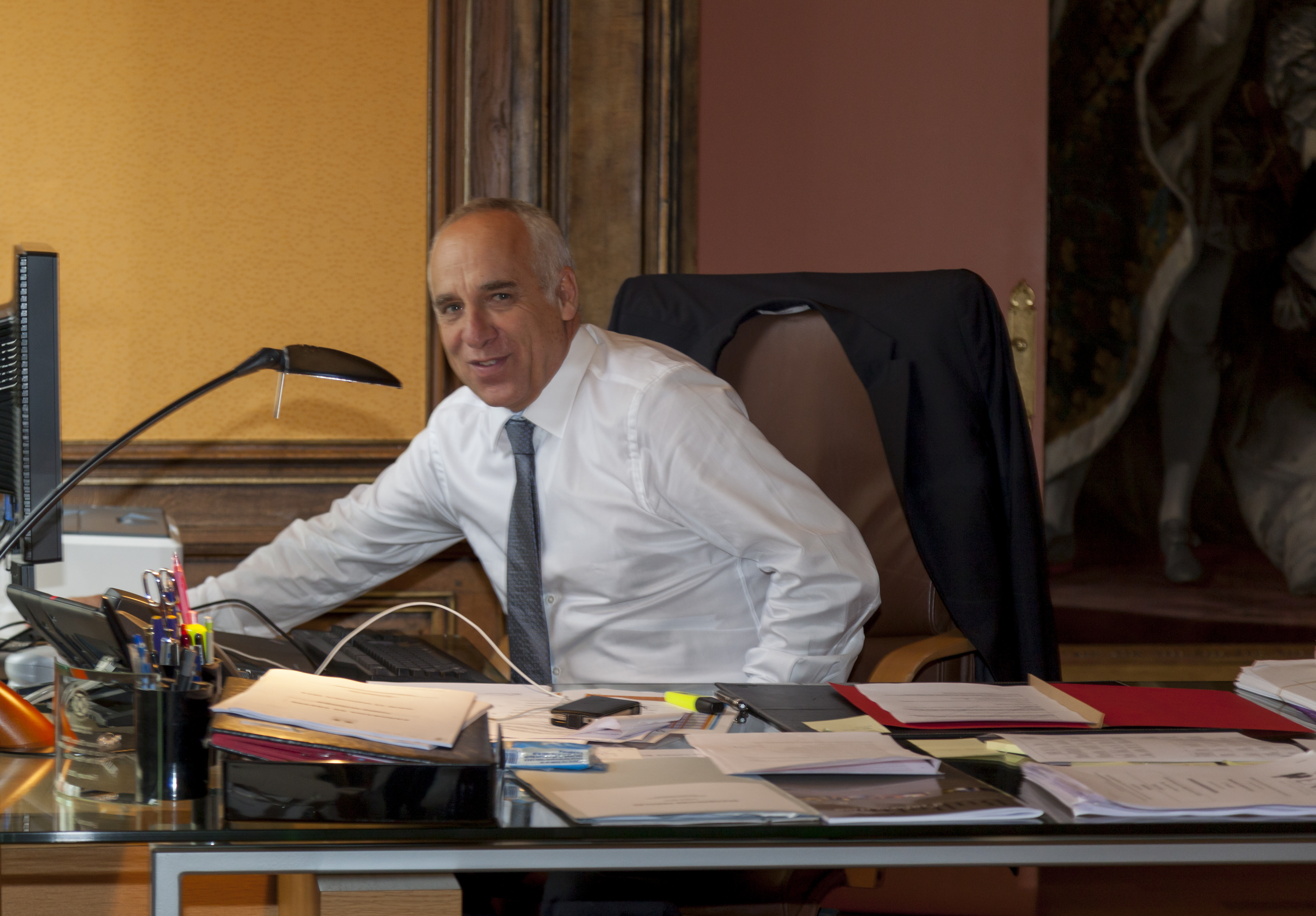
photo taken in his office

Bruno Cathala (born on 23 July 1955 in Pamiers, France) is a French judge. Currently President of the Tribunal de Grande Instance (Civil and Criminal Court) in Évry, France, he was the first Registrar of the International Criminal Court, a post he held from 3 July 2003 to 9 April 2008.

The Registry is responsible for the non-judicial aspects of the administration and servicing of the Court. As the first incumbent of the post of Registrar, Bruno Cathala set up a strategic plan making it possible to ensure the quality and fairness of justice at the ICC, the safety and security of victims and witnesses, the competence of Defence counsel – in particular by establishing a list of counsel authorised to practice before the Court, public information and outreach, and the Court’s presence in the field through its field offices in the Democratic Republic of the Congo, Uganda, the Central African Republic and Chad.

== Biography ==
=== Education ===
An alumnus of the Lycée Français of Belgium, Bruno Cathala studied law in Paris. He earned a Maîtrise de Droit (Law diploma) from the Université de Paris XI in 1978, and a post-graduate Diplôme d’études approfondies in civil law in 1980. He entered the École Nationale de la Magistrature (National Magistracy School) in January 1981 (class of 1981 A).

He then rounded out his training as a judge through continuous professional development, with a view, in particular, to understanding common law practices, through an internship with the Irish judicial authorities in 1986, and mediation, through an internship in Quebec in 1989, and within the context of a training course for officials of the Ministry of Justice.

He also holds a diploma from the Institut des hautes études de la défense nationale (IHEDN – 51st national session – 1998/1999) and from the Institut des hautes études de la sécurité intérieure (IHESI – 8th national session– 1996/1997).

=== Activities in France ===
Bruno Cathala began his judicial career as a judge in training in La Rochelle and went on to be a juvenile judge, first at the Tribunal de Grande Instance (Civil and Criminal Court) in Rouen and then in Nîmes from 1981 to 1987. He was assigned to the École Nationale de la Magistrature (National Magistracy School) from 1987 to 1990) to teach future judges how to be juvenile judges.

It was during his tenure as President of the Tribunal de Grande Instance (Civil and Criminal Court) of Montargis from 1990 to 1994 that he became interested in court management and administration, and in the practical aspects of being a judge.

His move to the Ministry of Justice as Associate Director of Protection Judiciaire de la Jeunesse (Judicial protection of youth) from 1994 to 1996 allowed him to acquire greater in-depth experience of managing a public administration and defining public policy in the field of child protection and juvenile delinquency. After a short spell in court as the Vice-President of the Tribunal de Grande Instance (Civil and Criminal Court) in Créteil from 1996 to 1999, where he presided over the family and criminal chambers, he was appointed Inspector of Judicial Services, a post he held from 1999 to 2001. This position gave him the opportunity to participate, inter alia, in auditing the operations of courts and drafting a joint report with the Inspectorate of Social Affairs on provisional accommodation and placement of children and adolescents. This was in 2000.

=== Overseas activities ===
==== Prior to May 2001 ====
Bruno Cathala did his military service from 1978 to 1979 in the area of military cooperation as a national service volunteer and was in charge of the academic cycle at the Ecole Nationale d’Administration in Abidjan, Côte d'Ivoire. This was his first contact with Africa.

He subsequently participated in many missions abroad.

First, in Asia. He made three trips to Phnom Penh, Cambodia – the first after the Paris agreement and before the elections organised by the UN in 1993, during which time, he organised a training course for judges and shared his expertise in order to set up a training structure in Cambodia. He returned on two other occasions to continue the training and to accompany the Director of the École Nationale de la Magistrature (National Magistracy School) who brought the project to fruition. He also travelled to Vientiane, Laos in 1992, also as part of a training programme for judges and prosecutors

Later, in Eastern Europe, he took an active role in a training course on professional ethics for judges as part of training sessions organised in Varna in Bulgaria, in July 2000, and in Sarajevo, Bosnia-Herzegovina in September 2000.

That same year, he also took part in a Franco-Québécois seminar in Québec, comparing judicial administration systems.

Lastly, he travelled to Africa in 1991 for a symposium organised in Abidjan on the duties of judges and for a training course on professional conduct and ethics of judges in Madagascar in 1998.

==== International courts ====
After holding the post of Deputy Registrar of the International Criminal Tribunal for the Former Yugoslavia from 2001 to 2002, Bruno Cathala continued his international career at the International Criminal Court (ICC) in The Hague in the Netherlands. On 9 September 2002, he was appointed by the first session of the Assembly of States Parties to the Statute of the Court as Director of Common Services, thereby becoming the first official recruited by the organisation. Accordingly, he was called on, pursuant to decision ICC-ASP/1/Decision 2, "on an interim basis, [to] perform the functions and responsibilities of the Registrar" pending the Registrar’s taking up office.

With the small group of staff members he recruited, in concert with the Host State and the President of the Assembly of States Parties, Prince Zeid Ra’ad Zeid Al-Hussein from Jordan, he went on to lay the foundations of the new organisation and to prepare the swearing-in ceremony of the judges who were elected in early 2003 and of the Prosecutor who was elected in April 2003.

He was subsequently elected Registrar of the ICC for a term of five years by an absolute majority of the judges meeting in plenary session on 24 June 2003. He made the solemn declaration on 3 July that same year. During his term, he laid the foundations for the administration of the organisation, whose purpose, he recalled, was "to produce quality decisions throughout a fair trial", that is, from referral to the Prosecutor through to enforcement. As such, his main areas of focus were the respective requirements of defence counsel, counsel for victims and protected witnesses, and the need to ensure that the trial is made public, particularly in the interests of the victims of the crimes. Together with other registrars, he is one of the founding organisers of an annual meeting of registrars of international criminal courts, the first of which was held in Freetown, Sierra Leone in 2004.

In 2008, Silvana Arbia succeeded Cathala as the Registrar of the ICC.

== Honours and awards ==
- Médaille de la Protection judiciaire de la jeunesse – 1998
- Légion d’honneur (Legion of Honour) – 2008

== General references ==
- ICC Website
- Tribunal de Grande Instance of Evry

Legal offices
Preceded by First in office	Registrar of the International Criminal Court; 2003–2008	Succeeded by Silvana Arbia
