= 1968 Ecuadorian general election =

- 2 June 1968
- Presidential election
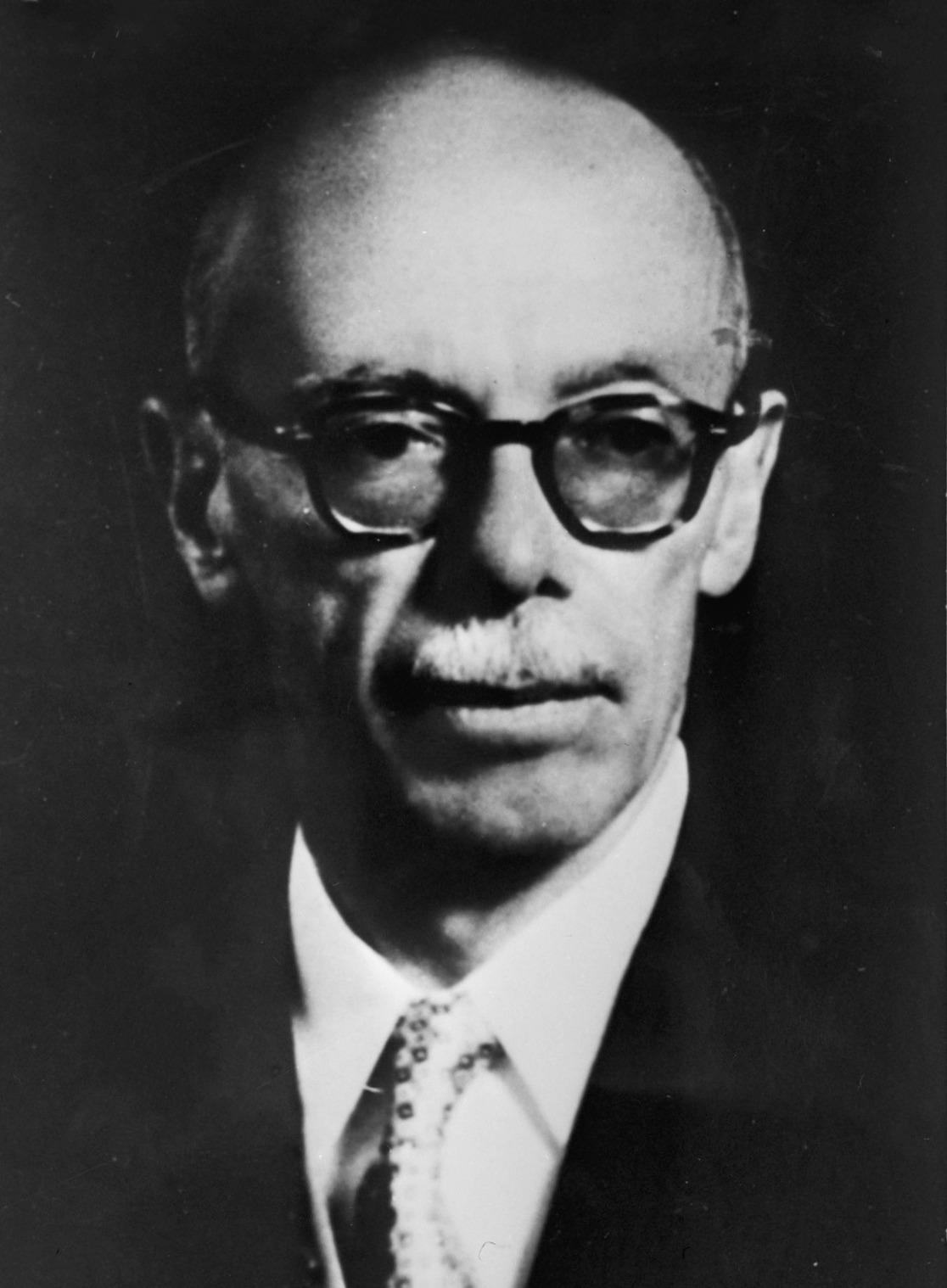

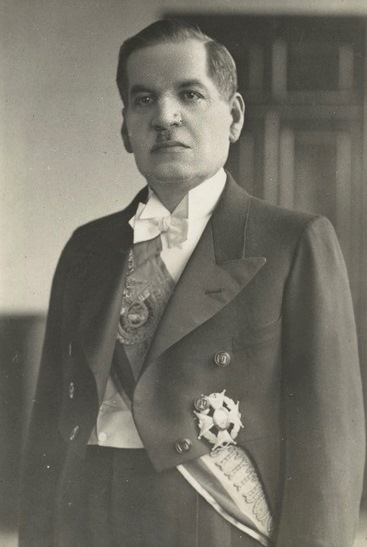

Nominee	José María Velasco Ibarra	Andrés Córdova	Camilo Ponce Enríquez
Party	FNV	PLRE	PSC
Running mate	Víctor Hugo Sicouret	Jorge Zavala	Roberto Nevárez Vásquez
Popular vote	280,370	264,312	259,833
Percentage	32.85%	30.97%	30.44%
- Map of results by provinces.
President before election
Otto Arosemena
Elected President
Velasco Ibarra
FNV

General elections were held in Ecuador on 2 June 1968. The presidential election was won by José María Velasco Ibarra of the National Velasquista Federation, who received 33% of the vote. He started his fifth and last term in office on 1 September.

== President ==
Candidate	Running mate	Party	Votes	%
José María Velasco Ibarra	Víctor Hugo Sicouret	National Velasquista Federation	280,370	32.85
Andrés Córdova	Jorge Zavala	Ecuadorian Radical Liberal Party	264,312	30.97
Camilo Ponce Enríquez	Roberto Nevárez Vásquez	Social Christian Party	259,833	30.44
Jorge Crespo	Eudoro Cevallos	Ecuadorian Nationalist Revolutionary Action	31,991	3.75
Elías Gallegos	Gonzalo Villalba	People's Democratic Union	17,040	2.00
Total			853,546	100.00
Valid votes			853,546	91.88
Invalid/blank votes			75,435	8.12
Total votes			928,981	100.00
Registered voters/turnout			1,198,874	77.49
Source: Nohlen
