= Mariano Suárez =

27th President of Ecuador

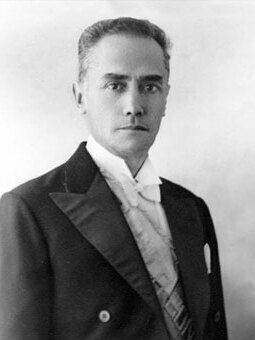

27th President of Ecuador
- In office 2 September 1947 – 16 September 1947
- Vice President: Carlos Julio Arosemena Tola
- Preceded by: Carlos Mancheno Cajas
- Succeeded by: Carlos Julio Arosemena Tola

Vice President of Ecuador
- In office 10 August 1946 – 23 August 1947
- President: José María Velasco Ibarra
- Preceded by: Alfredo Baquerizo Moreno
- Succeeded by: Carlos Julio Arosemena Tola

Personal details
- Born: 8 June 1897 Otavalo, Ecuador
- Died: 23 October 1980 (aged 83) Quito, Ecuador
- Party: Conservative

Mariano Suárez Veintimilla (8 June 1897 – 23 October 1980) was an Ecuadorian politician.

He was Minister of Finance from 1944 to 1945. He served as Velasco's Vice President from 1946 until he was ousted in 1947 by Carlos Mancheno Cajas. Soon Mancheno was ousted and Suárez served briefly as President of Ecuador from 2 September 1947 to 16 September 1947.

Political offices
Preceded by Alfredo Baquerizo Moreno	Vice President of Ecuador; 1946-1947	Succeeded by Carlos Julio Arosemena Tola
Preceded by Carlos Mancheno	President of Ecuador; 1947	Succeeded by Carlos Julio Arosemena Tola
