= Peter Lewis (prosecutor) =

Sir Peter Lewis KCMG CB

Chief Executive Crown Prosecution Service
- In office January 2007 – 31 March 2016
- Attorney General: The Baroness Scotland of Asthal (–2010); Dominic Grieve (2010–2014); Jeremy Wright (2014–retirement)
- DPP: Ken Macdonald (–2008); Keir Starmer (2008–2013); Alison Saunders (2013–retirement)
- Preceded by: Richard Foster
- Succeeded by: Nick Folland

Personal details
- Education: City of Birmingham Polytechnic

Sir Peter Edward Lewis KCMG CB is a retired British prosecutor, serving from 2007 until 2016 as the Chief Executive of the Crown Prosecution Service under the Director of Public Prosecutions. Between April 2018 and April 2023 he was Registrar of the International Criminal Court.

== Career ==
Lewis qualified as a solicitor in 1981, and started as a prosecutor in West Midlands Prosecuting Solicitors before joining the Crown Prosecution Service at its inception in 1986 when the police prosecutorial offices were merged into a single national body.

Appointed as Chief Executive in January 2007 to replace Richard Foster, Lewis was the first Chief Executive of the service to be appointed from within the ranks having started as a prosecutor. As of 2015, Lewis was paid a salary of between £160,000 and £164,999, making him one of the 328 most highly paid people in the British public sector at that time.

In February 2016, the CPS announced that Lewis would retire, and be replaced by Nick Folland from 16 March 2016.

Lewis was appointed Companion of the Order of the Bath (CB) in the 2012 Birthday Honours.

On 28 March 2018, he was elected Registrar to the International Criminal Court for a period of five years; and on 17 April, he was sworn in. He was succeeded as Registrar by Osvaldo Zavala Giler on 17 April 2023.

He was appointed Knight Commander of the Order of St Michael and St George (KCMG) in the 2023 Birthday Honours for services to the International Criminal Court and international criminal justice.

Political offices
Preceded by Richard Foster	Chief Executive, Crown Prosecution Service; 2007–2016	Succeeded by Nick Folland

Legal offices
Preceded by Herman von Hebel	Registrar of the International Criminal Court; 2018–2023	Succeeded by Osvaldo Zavala Giler
