= Aztra massacre =

The Aztra massacre was a massacre of workers perpetrated by the National Police of Ecuador on October 18, 1977, at the Aztra ingenio, located in the La Troncal Canton, Cañar Province. The massacre left more than a hundred workers killed, mostly Indigenous, and occurred after the Indigenous workers started a strike to demand better wages.

Those responsible for the massacre were never tried and the events went unpunished.

The massacre was the main motivator for the creation of the Ecumenical Commission for Human Rights. The events surrounding it were also brought to the theater in 2016 in the play Tazas rosas de té, written by the Ecuadorian playwright Gabriela Ponce Padilla as a way of rescuing the memory of the victims of the massacre.

== Background ==
During the years prior to the massacre, the dictatorship of the Supreme Council of Government initiated a series of reforms against the unions and against various workers' demands. Among them, a national security law was passed. declaring strikes illegal and equating them with subversive movements. The Ecuadorian Confederation of Unitary Workers' Classist Organizations was declared illegal, and leaders of the National Union of Educators and the Federation of Secondary Students of Ecuador. were imprisoned.

In 1976, workers at the Aztra ingenio, a 90% state-owned sugar plantation, succeeded in having a clause included in their collective contract stating that they would receive 20% of any increase in the price of sugar. After the military dictatorship announced the increase in the quintal of sugar from 220 to 300 sucres, a decree was issued in September 1977 that unilaterally eliminated the clause that gave workers a share of the profits of the increase.

During the first hours of October 18, 1977, about 2,000 workers went on strike and occupied the ingenio facilities as a way of demanding payment of the corresponding proportional amount for the increase in the price of sugar. Throughout the day the wives and children of the workers joined in, who came to the ingenio to bring food to the strikers.

== The massacre ==
On the afternoon of October 18, 1977, officers Eduardo Díaz and Lenin Cruz arrived at the Aztra ingenio, commanding a contingent of 100 policemen from the city of Babahoyo. Once in the place, they announced through a loudspeaker that they were giving a two-minute ultimatum for the workers and their families to leave the ingenio facilities, the same ones who were having dinner at that time. When the workers refused and showed their machetes as a sign of resistance, the policemen opened fire on those present, which caused a stampede of people trying to escape amid detonations of tear gas bombs thrown by the police.

Residents of La Troncal arrived at the scene after news of the massacre arrived, but the police also opened fire on them.

The massacre lasted around three hours and once it was finished, Major Eduardo Díaz sent a statement to his superior in which he stated: "The order has been fully carried out." During the following days, the dictatorship of the Supreme Council of Government tried to blame the massacre on the leaders of the strike themselves and accused them of being part of an international terrorist plot. Many of the bodies of the murdered workers and their families, including women and children, were never found. According to the residents of La Troncal, some of the missing corpses have been thrown into the boilers of the ingenio.

The event sparked nationwide protests. They were repressed by the military dictatorship, which imprisoned protesters and raided the facilities of the University of Guayaquil.
