= Carlos Mancheno Cajas =

Ecuadorian politician (1902–1996)

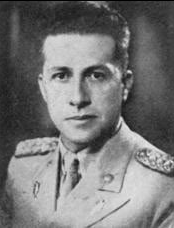
- Carlos Mancheno Cajas

President of Ecuador
- In office 23 August 1947 – 2 September 1947
- Preceded by: José María Velasco
- Succeeded by: Mariano Suárez

Personal details
- Born: 9 October 1902 Riobamba, Ecuador
- Died: 11 October 1996 (aged 94) Quito, Ecuador

Carlos Mancheno Cajas (9 October 1902 – 11 October 1996) was President of Ecuador from 23 August 1947 to 2 September 1947. Mancheno assumed control after a coup d'état he led deposed President José María Velasco. Velasco left the country, returning later both to Ecuador and to the presidency. Mancheno himself was removed only ten days after taking control, and Velasco's vice-president, Mariano Suárez, assumed the presidency.

Political offices
Preceded by José María Velasco	President of Ecuador; 1947	Succeeded by Mariano Suárez
