= Silvana Arbia =

Italian registrar

Silvana Arbia (born 19 November 1952 in Senise, Italy) is an Italian judge. She was previously the Registrar of the International Criminal Court. After gaining experience as a judge and prosecutor in Italy, Arbia made her international début as a Senior Trial Attorney at the International Criminal Tribunal for Rwanda.

== Biography ==
=== Education and training ===
Arbia obtained her master's degree in law at the University of Padua in Italy in 1976 and, while working, continued her training in order to specialise in European law (at the Academy of European Law in Florence) and international law (at The Hague Academy of International Law). She undertook additional training at the René Cassin International Institute of Human Rights in 1989 and at the Canadian Human Rights Foundation in 1995.

=== Activities in Italy ===
While practising law in Venice, Arbia passed a public competitive examination to become a judge and prosecutor in Italy, positions which she held until 1999. Amongst other functions, she sat on the first criminal chamber of the Appeals Court.

During that time, Arbia was a fervent advocate of human rights, a subject which she taught at the LUISS University in Rome and at the Police Academy. This commitment also drove her to become a consultant with the non-governmental organisation CRIC.

On several occasions, she was appointed to represent the Italian Ministry of Justice in various international programmes on topics such as "Concerted European initiatives and Italian legislation to combat human trafficking and sexual exploitation of children" and "Victims of crimes in the European Union".

=== International activities ===
==== International Criminal Tribunal for Rwanda (ICTR) ====
On 24 October 1999, Arbia was appointed Senior Trial Attorney, and later Acting Chief of Prosecutions in the Office of the Prosecutor of the International Criminal Tribunal for Rwanda, then Chief of prosecutions. As Chief of Prosecutions, she led all prosecutions'teams and the prosecution in some of the most significant cases before the ICTR:

- Butare Case: prosecution of six accused, including the former Minister of Family and Women's Affairs, the only woman charged to date with genocide, crimes against humanity and war crimes under international law as well as the first woman ever to be charged with rape as a crime against humanity and a war crime before an international tribunal;
- Seromba Case: the first Catholic priest charged with, and convicted for, genocide and crimes against humanity.

==== International Criminal Court (ICC) ====
Arbia participated in the drafting of the Rome Statute of the International Criminal Court as a member of the Italian delegation at the diplomatic conference held in Rome in 1998.

Her election as Registrar of the International Criminal Court on 28 February 2008 was a logical progression from her career at the ICTR. As Registrar, Arbia is responsible for the non-judicial aspects of the administration and servicing of the Court.

== Notes and references ==
=== Publications ===
- Essay on police proceedings ("I provvedimenti di polizia", Nuovissimo Digesto, Utet, 1986).
- Essay on Italian jurisprudence and the European Convention on Human Rights ("La Giurisprudenza italiana e la Convenzione Europea dei diritti dell'Uomo", Rivista internazionale dei Diritti dell'Uomo, Milan, N.1/1999).
- Essay on the International Convention on the Rights of the Child (Edizioni scientifiche italiane, 1994).
- Report on legal problems concerning immigrant children from non-EU countries ("I minori extracomunitari: problemi giuridici", XVth International Congress, Child Health Plan '98, Ancona, Italy, 1998-05-28/30, Ed. G.M. Caramia, pp. 83 to 95).
- Brief commentary on the treaties of the European Community and Union, edited by Fausto Pocar, published by Cedam, Padua, 2001 (commentaries on articles 39/42, 125/130 and 136/140).
- "Mentre il mondo stava a guardare [Vittime, carnefici e crimini internazionali: le battaglie di una donna magistrato nel nome della giustizia]", published by Strade Blu – Mondadori, November 2011, winning Premio Carlo Levi 2012.

=== Sources ===
- Biography of Silvana Arbia on ICC website

Legal offices
Preceded by Bruno Cathala	Registrar of the International Criminal Court; 2008–2013	Succeeded by Herman von Hebel
