= Jorge Zavala =

Vicepresident of Ecuador (1921–2014)

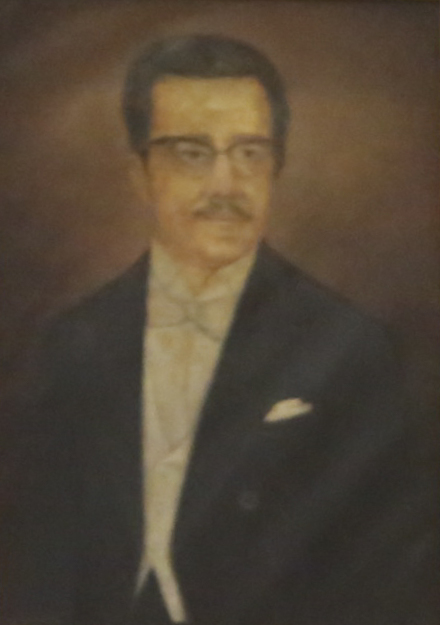

President of the National Congress
- In office 1987–1988

Vice President of Ecuador
- In office 1968–1970
- Preceded by: Reinaldo Varea Donoso

Personal details
- Born: Jorge Zavala Baquerizo; 13 May 1921 Ecuador
- Died: 9 May 2014 (aged 92) Guayaquil, Ecuador
- Party: Democratic Left
- Relatives: Osvaldo Zavala Giler (grandson)

Jorge Zavala Baquerizo (13 May 1921 – 9 May 2014) was an Ecuadorian politician. He served as the Vice President of Ecuador from 1968 to 1970 under the José María Velasco Ibarra administration. He served as President of the National Congress 1987–1988. He was a member of the Democratic Left.

Zavala died in Guayaquil, Ecuador from natural causes, aged 92. His grandson, Osvaldo Zavala Giler, has served as registrar of the International Criminal Court.

Political offices
Preceded by Reinaldo Varea Donoso	Vice President of Ecuador; 1968–1972	Succeeded by Military Junta
