= Herman von Hebel =

Dutch jurist (born 1961)

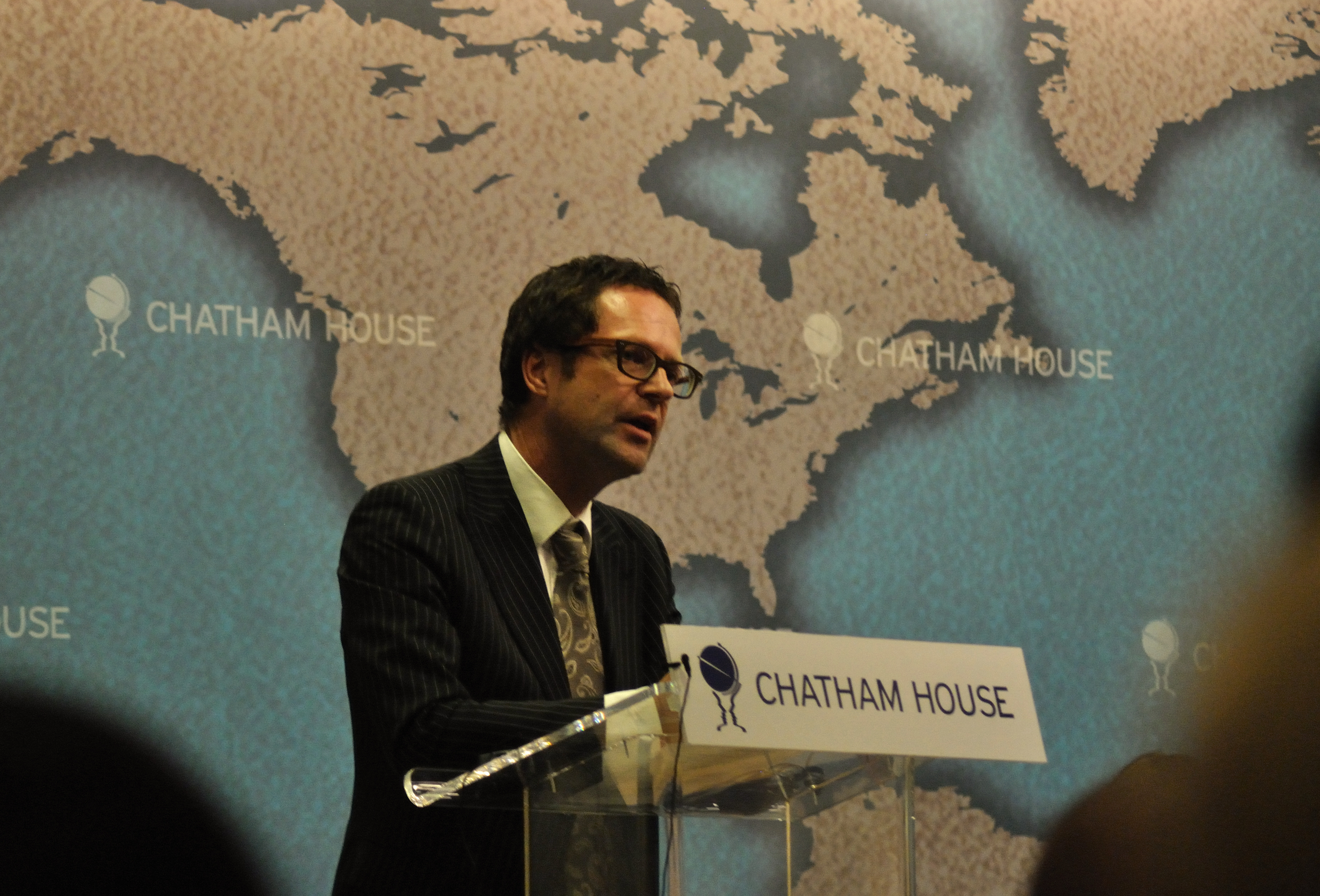

Herman von Hebel (born 22 November 1961) is a Dutch jurist who was Registrar of the International Criminal Court between 2013 and 2018.

== Career ==
Van Hebel was born on 22 November 1961 in Coevorden. From 1981 to 1987 Von Hebel studied international law at the University of Groningen. From 1991 he worked at the Ministry of Foreign Affairs of the Netherlands.

He was a senior legal officer at the International Criminal Tribunal for the former Yugoslavia from 2001 to 2006. He was Deputy Registrar and later Registrar for the Special Court for Sierra Leone between 2006 and 2009. Von Hebel subsequently became Deputy Registrar of the Special Tribunal for Lebanon. On 10 December 2010 Secretary-General of the United Nations Ban Ki-moon appointed Von Hebel as Registrar. He held positions at the Tribunal between 2009 and 2013.

== International Criminal Court ==
Von Hebel was elected as Registrar of the International Criminal Court on 8 March 2013. On 18 April 2013 he succeeded Silvana Arbia and was sworn in for a five-year term. On 13 March 2018 he withdrew his candidacy for a second term. His term in office ended with the presentation of an end-of-mandate report on 16 April 2018, he was succeeded by Peter Lewis.

== Later career ==
After his time at the International Criminal Court Von Hebel became parttime judge at the court of appeal of 's-Hertogenbosch and consultant on the rechtsstaat. From 2022 Von Hebel was chair of the pre-vetting commission for judicial candidates to the Council for the Judiciary of Moldova which was necessary for the accession of Moldova to the European Union.

Legal offices
Preceded by Silvana Arbia	Registrar of the International Criminal Court; 2013–2018	Succeeded by Peter Lewis
