= 1978 Ecuadorian constitutional referendum =

- 15 January 1978
- Do you want a new constitution or a revised version of the existing constitution?

Results
Choice	Votes	%
New constitution	807,574	58.09%
Revised constitution	582,556	41.91%
Valid votes	1,390,130	76.73%
Invalid or blank votes	421,510	23.27%
Total votes	1,811,640	100.00%
Registered voters/turnout	2,088,874	86.73%

A constitutional referendum was held in Ecuador on 15 January 1978. Voters were asked whether they wanted a new constitution or a revised version of the existing constitution. The former option was approved by 57% of voters, although around invalid votes accounted for a quarter of those cast, with many cast in protest at not having the option of returning to the 1945 constitution.

== Background ==
Following a military coup in 1972, in 1976 the military government formed three commissions to assist with the transition back to civil rule. One group was to draft a new constitution, one was to revise the 1945 constitution, and one to create laws on political parties, local elections and the referendum.

== Results ==
Choice	Votes	%
New constitution	778,611	57.20
Revised constitution	582,556	42,80
Invalid/blank votes	450,473	–
Total	1,811,640	100
Registered voters/turnout	2,088,874	86.73
Source: Direct Democracy
