= Guillermo Rodríguez (politician) =

Ecuadorian military and political official; President of Ecuador (1972–1976)

General Guillermo Rodríguez
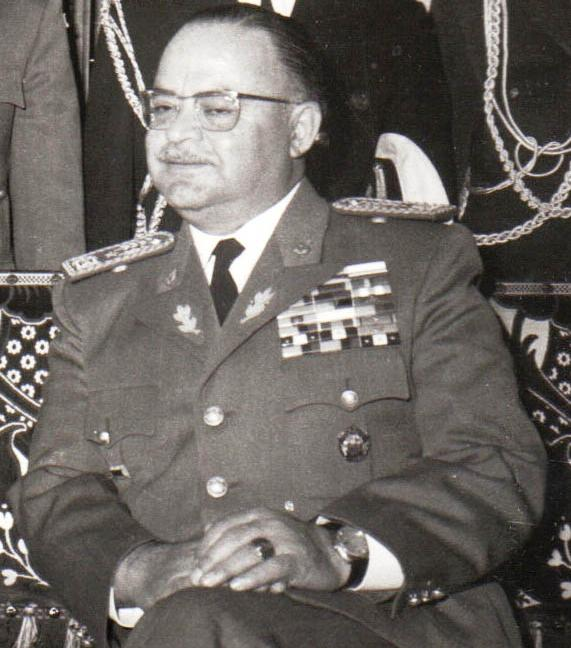
- Rodríguez in September 1973

Acting President of Ecuador
- In office 15 February 1972 – 11 January 1976
- Preceded by: José María Velasco Ibarra
- Succeeded by: Alfredo Poveda

Personal details
- Born: 4 November 1923 (age 103) Pujilí, Cotopaxi, Ecuador
- Spouse: Aída Judith León (m. 1953; died 2024)
- Children: 5
- Education: School of the Americas

Military service
- Allegiance: Ecuador
- Branch/service: Ecuadorian Army
- Commands: Ecuadorian Army
- Battles/wars: El Carnavalazo coup

Guillermo Antonio Rodríguez Lara (born 4 November 1923) is an Ecuadorian former political and military leader who was the dictator of Ecuador from 1972 to 1976. He came to power after leading the 1972 military coup against President José María Velasco Ibarra.

He characterised his government as "revolutionary and nationalistic."

== Biography ==
Rodríguez was born in Pujilí, Cotopaxi on 4 November 1923. He took courses in C&R&Bn Staff, Irregular Warfare Orientation, and Maintenance Management at the School of the Americas located in Panama.

As commander of the army, he led a military coup d'etat executed by a navy commander named Jorge Queirolo, and forced president José María Velasco into exile, to Buenos Aires, Argentina. During his rule, Ecuador experienced substantial economic growth due to an increase in oil prices. The oil wealth enabled his administration to embark on public works programs, funding the construction of hospitals, schools, roads (notably, paving the Quito-Tulcán road), the oil refinery at Esmeraldas, and new equipment for the armed services. Some military officers attempted an unsuccessful coup against him in 1975. The Ecuadorian military removed him from power in January 1976.

Rodríguez turned 100 on 4 November 2023. At 103 years old, he is now the oldest living former state leader in the world.

Political offices
Preceded by José María Velasco	President of Ecuador; 1972–1976	Succeeded by Alfredo Poveda
