= José María Velasco Ibarra =

24th President of Ecuador

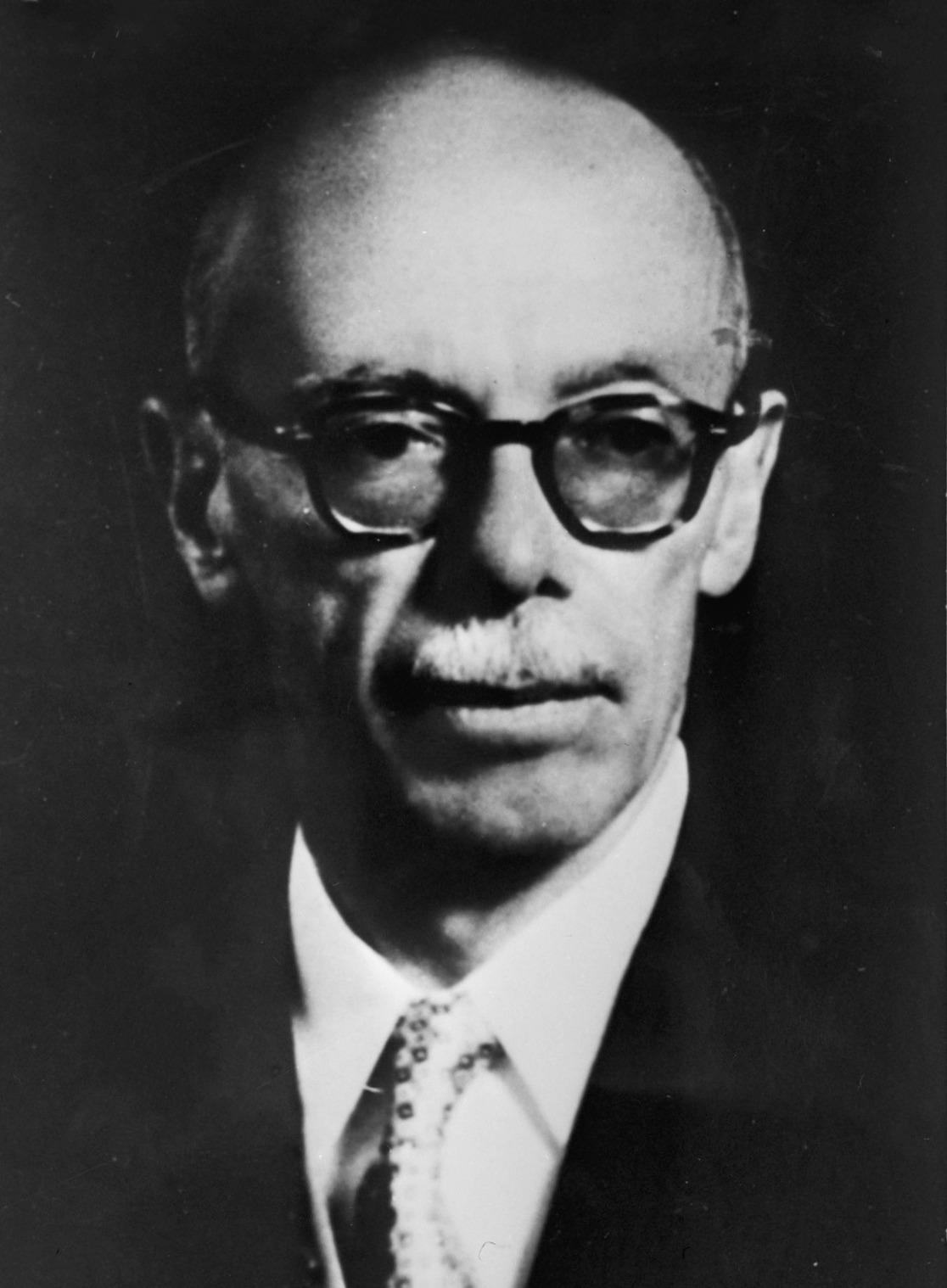
- Velasco Ibarra in 1973

24th President of Ecuador
- In office 1 September 1968 – 15 February 1972
- Vice President: Jorge Zavala Baquerizo
- Preceded by: Otto Arosemena Gómez
- Succeeded by: Guillermo Rodríguez Lara
- In office 1 September 1960 – 7 November 1961
- Vice President: Carlos Julio Arosemena Monroy
- Preceded by: Camilo Ponce Enríquez
- Succeeded by: Carlos Julio Arosemena Monroy
- In office 1 September 1952 – 1 September 1956
- Vice President: Alfredo Chiriboga
- Preceded by: Galo Plaza Lasso
- Succeeded by: Camilo Ponce Enríquez
- In office 1 June 1944 – 23 August 1947
- Vice President: Mariano Suárez Veintimilla
- Preceded by: Carlos Alberto Arroyo del Río
- Succeeded by: Carlos Mancheno Cajas
- In office 1 September 1934 – 21 August 1935
- Preceded by: Abelardo Montalvo
- Succeeded by: Antonio Pons

Personal details
- Born: José María Velasco Ibarra; 19 March 1893 Quito, Ecuador
- Died: 30 March 1979 (aged 86) Quito, Ecuador
- Party: Conservative
- Spouse: Corina del Parral (m. 1938; died 1979)
- Education: Central University of Ecuador

José María Velasco Ibarra (19 March 1893 – 30 March 1979) was an Ecuadorian politician. He became president of Ecuador five non-consecutive times from 1934 to 1972. Only in 1952–1956 did he complete a full term. In his four other terms, he was removed by military force, and several times he was installed as president through a military coup.

== Early life and career ==
Velasco Ibarra was born on 19 March 1893 in Quito. His parents were Delia Ibarra and Alejandrino Velasco, a civil engineer. His father was a political activist in the conservative party during the dictatorship installed by the liberal revolution. He was home schooled by his mother. His father died when he was 16. He attended high school at Colegio San Gabriel and obtained a JD (Doctorate in Jurisprudence) from the Central University of Ecuador. As an author he published several books, including Conciencia y Barbarie, and was also a columnist for El Comercio.

His first public post was in Quito's Municipal Government, where he supervised works and visited communities. His political career began when he was named a Deputy of the Republic. In 1932, he was elected as Vice President of the Chamber of Deputies and several days later, President of the Chamber of Deputies.

== Presidencies ==
In 1933, he stood in the Ecuadorian presidential election and received 80% of the votes cast, the highest in Ecuadorian history. Velasco Ibarra traveled through several Latin American countries, including Peru, and restored Ecuador's global image. As president, he focused primarily on public works programs.

His first presidency began on 1 September 1934. He was unable to get support for his policies in parliament, leading him to try to seize dictatorial powers but he was ousted in August 1935 by a military coup. He went into exile in Colombia, where he worked in the Santander School in Sevilla, which was named the best school in Colombia. Later, he traveled to Buenos Aires, where he worked as a university professor.

He stood again in the 1940 election and was defeated by the Radical Liberal Party candidate Carlos Arroyo del Río by a small margin. Arroyo del Río lacked Velasco Ibarra's popularity and public support, which indicated that there had been a fraud. Velasco Ibarra plotted a coup d'état with pilots from the Salinas Air Force base. Before executing his plan, he was detained and exiled again.

1944 was an especially acute crisis, following the defeat of Ecuador in a war with Peru. There was a bitter rivalry between the conservative regular army and the more radical national police (the 'carabineros'). High inflation had soured the people. Velasco Ibarra built his coalition using the rhetoric of moral reform, calling for the virtuous common people to rise against the corrupt and selfish oligarchy. Velasco presented himself as the embodiment of positive moral qualities, appealing to both Left and Right without presenting any precise political program. Thanks to the "Glorious Revolution" of May 28, he was named Supreme Chief of the Republic and was later named Constitutional President by the Constituent Assembly.

In March 1946, Velasco Ibarra implemented a self-coup with the support of Conservatives. He suspended the constitution and seized dictatorial powers. He persecuted leftist politicians and shut down most leftist media outlets.

In August 1947, he was again deposed by a military coup. Three defense ministers perpetrated the coup against Velasco Ibarra; among them was minister Mancheno, who later was his successor.

In 1952, he again won the presidential election, and began his third term as president on September 1, 1952. This time, he served his entire term, which ended on August 31, 1956. His third term was a time of progress for Ecuador: 311 schools were constructed, with another 104 in progress. More than 1359 km of roads were constructed, and 1057 km more were improved. Velasco Ibarra was a noted orator: in his political campaigns from town to town, he captivated people with eloquence, becoming a leader of the masses. Velasco Ibarra once said, "Give me a balcony and I will become president."

In 1960, he was elected president for the fourth time. In 1960, he nullified the Rio de Janeiro Protocol, which led to conflicts between Ecuador and Peru, including Paquisha in 1981 and the War of El Cenepa in 1995. He was ousted in a military coup on November 7, 1961.

Finally, in 1968, Velasco Ibarra won the presidency for a fifth time. In 1970, he suspended the constitution and seized dictatorial powers. He announced elections for 1972, but the military did not think there was a candidate who could defeat Assad Bucaram, leader of the CFP. On February 15, 1972, the military overthrew Velasco Ibarra and installed General Guillermo Rodríguez Lara as dictator.

In total, Velasco Ibarra governed nearly 13 years, making him the longest-serving president in Ecuadorian history (although Rafael Correa's decade-long presidency from 2007 until 2017 is the longest continuous presidency). The events surrounding the end of his fifth and last presidency are dealt with in Philip Agee's book Inside the Company: A CIA Diary.

Velasco was a fiery populist who did not have a formal party organization. Rather it was his populist rhetoric that attracted enthusiastic followers, as he presented himself as the advocate of the poor and downtrodden. In office he was not responsible for major reforms, but he used patronage effectively to maintain his largely inefficient and corrupt administrations.

There is debate about whether his rule can correctly be labelled as populist. Following Agustin Cueva, several authors have argued that in the midst of a hegemonic crisis Velasco rose to power on the votes of the coastal sub-proletariat, peasants who had migrated to urban centres as the cacao industry dwindled. The charismatic figure of Velasco, according to this view, emotionally captured the masses with promises of redemption. Others, among them Rafael Quintero, argue that the entrenched landowning elite was instrumental for Velasco's victory (at least in the 1930s), as the Coastal elite had been weakened by the end of the cacao boom.

== Works ==
Velasco Ibarra always had a special preoccupation with infrastructure. Many public works, including roads, hospitals, and bridges, were constructed during Velasco Ibarra's presidencies. He was the initiator of institutions such as the Supreme Electoral Tribunalián and Guamote. He decreed the law of weekly days off for workers, ordered the construction of irrigation canals, educational infrastructure, aircraft fields, and highways.

== Death ==
Velasco Ibarra's wife, Corina Parral de Velasco Ibarra died in Buenos Aires after falling from a bus. This precipitated the death of Velasco Ibarra, who said on his return to Ecuador, "I come to meditate and to die." He died in Quito, on 30 March 1979.

Political offices
Preceded by Abelardo Montalvo	President of Ecuador; 1934–1935	Succeeded by Antonio Pons
Preceded by Carlos Alberto Arroyo del Río	President of Ecuador; 1944–1947	Succeeded by Carlos Mancheno Cajas
Preceded by Galo Plaza	President of Ecuador; 1952–1956	Succeeded by Camilo Ponce Enríquez
Preceded by Camilo Ponce Enríquez	President of Ecuador; 1960–1961	Succeeded by C.J. Arosemena Monroy
Preceded by Otto Arosemena	President of Ecuador; 1968–1972	Succeeded by Guillermo Rodríguez Lara
