= List of wars involving Ecuador =

This is a list of wars involving the Republic of Ecuador from 1820 to the present day.

Conflict	Combatant 1	Combatant 2	Results
Ecuadorian War of Independence (1820–1822)	Guayaquil; Gran Colombia; Chile; Peru; Río de la Plata	Spain	Victory: Incorporation of the Real Audiencia of Quito into Gran Colombia.
Gran Colombia–Peru War (1828–1829)	Gran Colombia	Peru	Stalemate: Status quo ante bellum
War of Cauca (1832)	Ecuador	New Granada	Defeat: Treaty of Pasto
War of the Supremes (1839–1841)	New Granada; Ecuador	(Republic of New Granada) Supremes	Victory
Capture of Manuel Briones (1851 or 1852)	Sweden-Norway; Ecuador	Pirates	Victory
Ecuadorian–Peruvian War of 1857–1860 (1857–1860)	Ecuador	Peru	Defeat: Treaty of Mapasingue; Diplomatic impasse arising from Ecuador's decision to grant its English creditors the vast Amazonian territories disputed with Peru. Ecuadorian failure.
Civil War of 1859 (1859–1860)	(Ecuador) Supreme Leadership	(Ecuador) Provisional Government	Provisional Government victory: Reunification of Ecuador
Ecuadorian–Colombian War (1863)	Ecuador	Colombia	Defeat: Ecuadorian withdrawal/capitulation (disputed) after the Battle of Cuaspud.; The Treaty of Pinsaquí
Chincha Islands War (1866)	Chile; Peru; Ecuador; Bolivia	Spain	Both sides claimed victory: Spanish withdrawal from the Chincha Islands.; The state of war is maintained between the belligerent parties until the signing of an indefinite armistice in 1871.; Subsequently, Spain and the South American allies signed peace treaties separately: Peru (1879), Bolivia (1879), Chile (1883) and Ecuador (1885).
Battle of Angoteros (1903)	Ecuador	Peru	Defeat: Advance of an Ecuadorian detachment in Peruvian territory that was repelled on the banks of the Napo River
Battle of Torres Causana (1904)	Ecuador	Peru	Defeat: Advance of Ecuadorian troops in Peruvian territory in the area of the Aguarico river and Napo river until their subsequent expulsion, taking of prisoners and captured war material.
War of the Generals (1911–1912)	(Ecuador) Supporters of Eloy Alfaro	(Ecuador) Opponents of Eloy Alfaro	Anti-Alfaro victory
Ecuadorian Civil War of 1913–1916 (1913–1916)	(Ecuador) Leónidas Plaza loyalists	(Ecuador) Rebels of Esmeraldas Province	Government victory: Leónidas Plaza remains president; Government re-asserts control of Esmeraldas Province
Ecuadorian Civil War of 1932 (1932)	(Ecuador) Supporters of Bonifaz	(Ecuador) Various opponents	Opposition victory: Congress restored into power.
Ecuadorian–Peruvian War of 1941 (1941)	Ecuador	Peru	Defeat: Rio Protocol
World War II (1945)	United States; Soviet Union; United Kingdom; China; France; Poland; Canada; Australia; New Zealand; India; South Africa; Yugoslavia; Greece; Denmark; Norway; Netherlands; Belgium; Luxembourg; Czechoslovakia; Brazil; Mexico; Chile; Bolivia; Colombia; Ecuador; Paraguay; Peru; Venezuela; Uruguay; Argentina	Germany; Japan; Italy; Hungary; Romania; Bulgaria; Croatia; Slovakia; Finland; Thailand; Manchukuo; Mengjiang	Victory: Collapse of the German Reich; Fall of Japanese and Italian Empires; Creation of the United Nations; Emergence of the United States and the Soviet Union as superpowers; Beginning of the Cold War
Border incident between Peru and Ecuador of 1978 (1978)	Ecuador	Peru	Defeat: The base and the camp set up by the Ecuadorian troops are now controlled by the Peruvian Army
Paquisha War (1981)	Ecuador	Peru	Defeat: Status quo of 1942 in favor of Peru
Cenepa War (1995)	Ecuador	Peru	Both sides claimed victory: Brasilia Presidential Act; Status quo ante bellum
War on drugs in Ecuador (2011–present)	Government of Ecuador: National Police of Ecuador; Armed Forces of Ecuador; Ecuadorian Army; Ecuadorian Navy; Ecuadorian Air Force; Armed civilians Counter-terrorist PMCs Supported by: United States; CIA; Canada; Colombia; Mexico (until 2024); Peru	Organized crime groups: Sinaloa Cartel; Los Choneros; CJNG; Los Lobos; Chone Killers; Los Tiguerones; Los Lagartos; Latin Kings; NETA Association; PCE-SR; FARC–EP; FARC dissidents; ELN; La Empresa; Other groups	Ongoing
Ecuadorian security crisis (2020–present)	Government of Ecuador	Organized crime groups	Ongoing
Ecuadorian conflict (2024–present)	Government of Ecuador United States	Organized crime groups, notably Los Choneros	Ongoing as a low-intensity conflict
