= History of Ecuador (1830–1860) =

Overview of the history of Ecuador, 1830–1860

State of Ecuador (1830–1835) Estado del Ecuador Republic of Ecuador (1835–1859) República del Ecuador
- 1830–1859
- Flag Coat of arms Coat of arms
- Motto: Dios, patria y libertad (Spanish); Pro Deo, Patria et Libertate (Latin); "God, homeland and freedom"
- Anthem: Salve, Oh Patria (Spanish) (English: "Hail, Oh Fatherland")
- Ecuador from 1830 to 1904
- Capital: Quito
- Government: Presidential republic
- President
  - 1830–1834: Juan José Flores
  - 1834–1839: Vicente Rocafuerte
  - 1839–1845: Juan José Flores
  - 1845: José Joaquín de Olmedo
  - 1845–1849: Vicente Ramón Roca
  - 1849–1850: Manuel de Ascásubi
  - 1850–1851: Diego Noboa
  - 1851–1856: José María Urvina
  - 1856–1859: Francisco Robles
- Vice President
  - 1830–1831: José Joaquín de Olmedo
  - 1831–1835: José Modesto Larrea
  - 1835–1839: Juan Bernardo León
  - 1839–1843: Francisco Aguirre
  - 1843–1845: Francisco Marcos
  - 1845–1847: Pablo Merino
  - 1847–1851: Manuel de Ascásubi
  - 1851–1852: Position abolished
- Legislature: National Congress
- History
  - Established: 3 May 1830
  - March Revolution: 6 March 1845
  - Disestablished: 31 August 1859
  - Battle of Guayaquil: 22-24 September 1860
Preceded by	Succeeded by
Colombia	Ecuador
- Today part of: Ecuador; Colombia; Peru; Brazil

The history of the Republic of Ecuador from 1830 to 1860 begins with the collapse of the nation of Gran Colombia in 1830, followed by the assassination of Antonio José de Sucre and the death of Simón Bolívar from tuberculosis the same year. Heartbroken at the dissolution of Gran Colombia, Bolívar is quoted to have said shortly before his death, "America is ungovernable. Those who have served the revolution have plowed the sea." These words would seem prophetic during the chaotic first thirty years of Ecuador's existence.

General Juan José Flores became the first President of Ecuador, ruling from 1830 to 1834. In 1834, facing a rebellion, he co-opted its presidential choice, José Vicente Rocafuerte y Rodríguez de Bejarano, and supported his presidency, while retaining considerable power as the commander of the military. In 1839, Rocafuerte retired, and Flores regained the presidency. In 1845, the Marcist Rebellion forced him into exile.

The next fifteen years saw much turmoil, as various factions struggled for supremacy. Matters came to a head in 1859, the "Terrible Year" in Ecuadorian history. Then President Francisco Robles faced several opposition movements. Neighboring Peru, under President Ramón Castilla, began negotiating with all factions and imposed a blockade. On Castilla's suggestion, the four competing Ecuadorian governments selected General Guillermo Franco to negotiate with him. When the various factions realized that Franco had betrayed them, they banded together. At the Battle of Guayaquil, fought between September 22–24, 1860, Franco was defeated, and a new conservative era of government was ushered in.

== Beginnings of the Republic of Ecuador ==
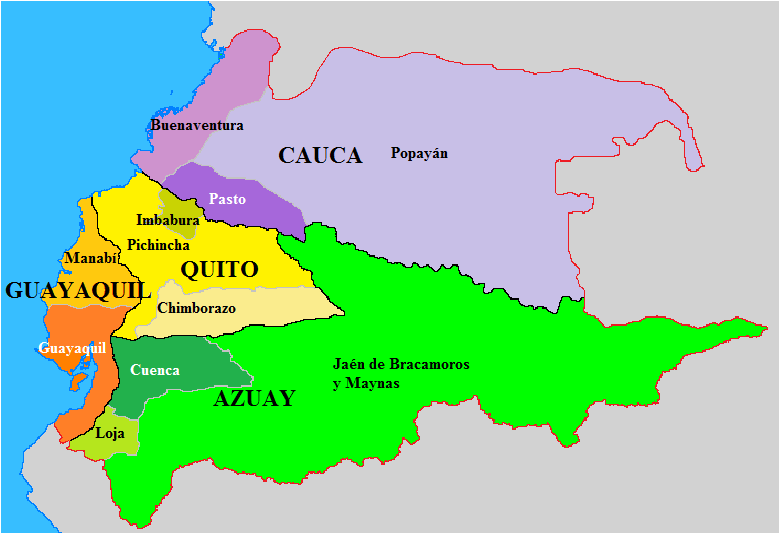
Ecuador in 1830

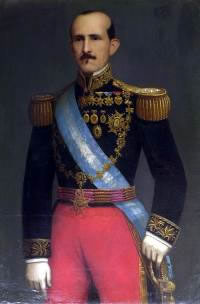
General Juan José Flores, the first President of Ecuador

Independence did not bring revolutionary liberation to the masses of Ecuadorian peasants. On the contrary, as bad as the peasants' situation had been, it probably worsened with the loss of the Spanish royal officials who had protected the indigenous population against the abuses of the local criollo elite. These criollos, who had spearheaded the struggle for independence, were to be its principal beneficiaries.

The early battle for control of the new state was fought, to a great extent, among the various factions—Ecuadorian and foreign, military and civilian—of this elite. General Juan José Flores, the "Founder of the Republic" and first President of Ecuador, was of the foreign military variety. Born in Venezuela, he had fought in the wars for independence with Bolívar, who had appointed him governor of Ecuador during its association with Gran Colombia. Although of humble origins with little formal education, Flores married into the Quiteño elite, gaining acceptance, initially at least, within the local criollo upper class. As a leader, however, he appeared to be primarily interested in maintaining his power. Military expenditures, from the wars of independence and from an unsuccessful campaign to wrest Cauca Province from Colombia in 1832, kept the state treasury empty while other matters were left unattended.

In 1833, four intellectuals who had begun publishing the newspaper El Quiteño Libre to denounce the "pillaging of the national treasury by foreigners" were killed by the authorities at a time when Flores was absent from Quito. Although not directly responsible for the killings, Flores inevitably became associated with them, and criticism of his regime grew. In 1834, opponents staged a rebellion in an effort to place José Vicente Rocafuerte y Rodríguez de Bejarano, a member of the Guayaquil aristocracy who had recently returned from fourteen years abroad, in the presidency. The effort failed; Flores then co-opted his opponent and sponsored Rocafuerte as a presidential candidate. For four years following this Machiavellian political move, in effect the nation's first coup d'état, Flores continued to wield considerable power behind the scenes as commander of the military.

President Rocafuerte's most lasting contribution was to begin the development of a public school system. Although he had previously condemned Flores's violations of civil liberties, Rocafuerte argued that "the backwardness of Ecuador makes enlightened despotism necessary." At the end of his term in 1839, Rocafuerte returned to his native Guayaquil as provincial governor, while in Quito Flores was again inaugurated as president. After four years in office, Flores summoned a constitutional convention that wrote a new constitution, dubbed "the Charter of Slavery" by his opponents, and elected him to a new eight-year term of office.

After 1843, opposition to Flores often manifested itself in unpleasant ways: in reference to the dark skin of Flores and his fellow Venezuelan and Colombian soldiers, Rocafuerte (by now exiled in Lima) wrote that "the white oppressors of the peninsula were less oppressive than the Negro vandals who have replaced them." A young student named Gabriel García Moreno—later to become the most infamous of all of Ecuador's nineteenth century dictators—tried unsuccessfully to assassinate Flores.

== The Marcist Revolution ==
Discontent had become nationwide by 1845, when an insurrection in Guayaquil forced Flores from the country. Because their movement triumphed in March (marzo), the anti-Flores coalition members became known as marcistas. They were an extremely diverse lot that included liberal intellectuals, conservative clergymen, and representatives from Guayaquil's successful business community.

On March 6, 1845, the people of Guayaquil revolted against the government of General Flores under the leadership of General António Elizalde and Lieutenant Colonel Fernándo Ayarza. The people took over the artillery barracks of Guayaquil along with other military and civilian supporters, including the guard on duty. Flores surrendered on his plantation, La Elvira, near Babahoyo and agreed to terms that included his leaving power and rendering all his decrees, laws, and acts void and null, ending fifteen years of foreign domination of Ecuador. Flores received 20,000 pesos for his property and immediately left the country for Spain. The country was then governed by the triumvirate composed of José Joaquín de Olmedo, Vicente Ramón Roca and Diego Noboa.

In 1846 the child Agustín Muñoz de Borbón, the half-brother of queen Isabella II of Spain, became a candidate for the throne of Ecuador. The proposal was made by Flores, former President of Ecuador, and consisted of two parts: the first one was declare Agustín as King of Ecuador, with his mother and Flores as Regents, and then as Restorer of the monarchy in Perú and Bolivia, converting him in the monarch of the tentative United Kingdom of Ecuador, Perú and Bolivia. While at first the proposal received some support from the Spanish and British governments, it collapsed.

The next fifteen years constituted one of the most turbulent periods in Ecuador's century and a half as a nation. The marcistas fought among themselves almost ceaselessly and also had to combat Flores' repeated attempts from exile to overthrow the government. The first marcista president was businessman Vicente Ramón Roca, who served a full four-year term. The most significant figure of the era, however, was General José María Urbina, who first came to power in 1851 through a coup d'état, remained in the presidency until 1856, and then continued to dominate the political scene until 1860. During this decade and the one that followed, Urbina and his archrival, García Moreno, would define the rivalry between liberals from Guayaquil and conservatives from Quito that remained the major sphere of political struggle in Ecuador into the 1980s.

Liberalism under Urbina took on anticlerical, ethnic, and regional dimensions. In 1852 he accused a group of Jesuit priests—admitted by his predecessor, Diego Noboa, only a year earlier—of political meddling and expelled them. Urbina freed the nation's slaves exactly one week after his coup of 1851, and six years later, his successor and lifelong friend, General Francisco Robles, finally put an end to three centuries of annual payments of tribute by the native peoples. Henceforth, liberalism associated itself with bettering the position of Ecuador's non-white population. Urbina and Robles also favored Guayaquil businessmen over Quito landowners.

== 1857: beginnings of renewed conflict with Peru ==
The early years of the Republic of Ecuador were spent under debt moratorium on the international financial market. The debts had been incurred during the Gran Colombia era, and had been assumed by President Flores in 1837. The debt owed to Great Britain, known as the Deuda inglesa ("English debt") exceeded 6.6 million pounds sterling, of which Ecuador owed 21.5 percent, or 1.4 million pounds. As the Ecuadorian government had done at least twice previously, President Francisco Robles attempted to settle this debt by transferring title over part of its territory; the lands would go to the creditors represented by the Ecuador Land Company, Ltd.

Relations between Ecuador and neighboring Peru had been cut off since 1855, but were reestablished by August 1857. In November, Peru formally claimed its right to the lands that were to be sold to the British creditors. Attempts at diplomatic resolution resulted in another breakdown of relations, and in October 1858, the Peruvian government authorized President Ramón Castilla to go to war with Ecuador if necessary to resolve the matter. A blockade of Ecuador's ports began in November.

=== 1859: the Terrible Year ===
By 1859, known in Ecuadorian history books as the "Terrible Year", the country was poised on the brink of a leadership crisis. President Robles, faced with the threat of the Peruvian blockade, moved the national capital to Guayaquil, and charged General José María Urbina with defending it. In the wake of this unpopular move, a series of opposition movements championed by regional caudillos were formed. On May 1, a conservative triumvirate, initiated by Dr. Gabriel García Moreno, Pacífico Chiriboga and Jerónimo Carrión (Robles' vice president), formed the Provisional Government of Quito. On May 6, Carrión separated himself from the triumvirate, and formed a short-lived government in the city of Cuenca; he was deposed the next day by forces loyal to Robles.

General Urbina promptly set out for Quito to subdue García Moreno and his movement. The Provisional Government was no match for Urbina, and fell in June. García Moreno fled to Peru, where he requested the support of President Castilla; the Peruvian leader supplied him with weapons and ammunition to subvert the Robles regime. Believing that he had the support of the Peruvians, in July, García Moreno published a manifesto in a July edition of the Peruvian newspaper El Comercio, calling on his countrymen to accept Peru as their ally against Robles, despite the territorial dispute and blockade. Shortly afterwards, García Moreno traveled to Guayaquil, where he met with General Guillermo Franco, General Commander of the District of Guayas and third in the Urvinista caudillo hierarchy, after Urbina and Robles. García Moreno proposed that they disavow Robles' government and declare free elections. While Franco accepted, he also aspired to the presidency of the republic, and would prove to be willing to betray his country to satisfy his desire for power.

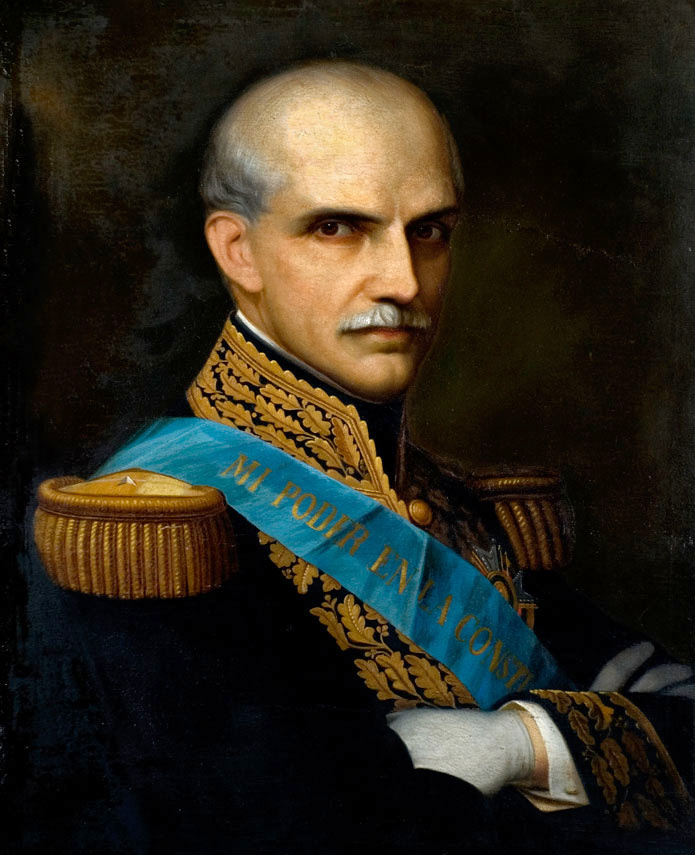
Dr. Gabriel García Moreno, leader of the Provisional Government of Quito

As García Moreno was trying to resurrect his movement, the mediation efforts of the Granadine Confederation (a short-lived federal republic) and Chile had fallen through, with both countries blaming Peru for the failure. The Peruvians were playing to all sides in the civil dispute; on August 31, 1859, Castilla betrayed his commitment to García Moreno, and came to an agreement with Franco that resulted in the end of the blockade of Guayaquil. Several weeks later, the Mosquera-Zelaya Protocol, the result of the secret agreement between Peru and Cauca to take control of Ecuador, was signed in Popayán.

When he received word of Franco's allegiance with Castilla, Robles disavowed their treaty, and moved the capital once again, this time to Riobamba, where he handed over leadership of the government to Jerónimo Carrión. He and Urbina would leave the country for good within a fortnight. Meanwhile, Rafael Carvajal, a member of the defeated Provisional Government, invaded Ecuador from the border to the north; within the month, Carvajal had reestablished the Provisional Government in Quito. Finally, on September 17, Guillermo Franco declared himself Supreme Chief of Guayas; however, Babahoyo, Vinces and Daule sided with the Provisional Government. On September 18, an assembly in Loja named Manuel Carrión Pinzano military and civil chief of the province; the following day, Carrión Pinzano called a new assembly that established a federal government presiding over Loja, El Oro and Zamora. On September 26, Cuenca affirmed its allegiance to the Provisional Government.

With the domestic situation at its most tumultuous, and the Peruvian blockade of the rest of the Ecuadorian coast nearing the end of its first year, Castilla sought to take advantage of the circumstances to impose a favorable border settlement. On September 20, Castilla wrote to Quito to declare his support for the Provisional Government; ten days later, he sailed from Callao with an invasion force. While stopped over in the port of Paita, in Peru, Castilla proposed to the Ecuadorians that they form a single government which could negotiate an agreement to end the blockade and the territorial dispute.

=== October 1859 ===
Castilla and his forces arrived in Guayaquil on October 4; the next day, he met with Franco aboard the Peruvian steamer Tumbes. Castilla simultaneously sent word to García Moreno that he wished to meet with him as well. García Moreno set out for Guayaquil days later; on October 14, he arrived in Paita aboard the Peruvian ship Sachaca. When García Moreno became aware that an agent of Franco's was also traveling aboard the ship, he became furious, ending the possibility of discussions, writing to Castilla, "You have broken your promises, and I declare our alliance finished." Castilla responded, "You sir, are nothing but a village diplomat, who does not understand the duties of a president, obligated by the demands of the position he occupies to give audience to all those who request it."

=== Treaty of Mapasingue ===
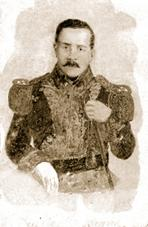
General Guillermo Franco, Supreme Chief of Guayaquil and Cuenca

Castilla reverted to negotiations solely with Franco's regime in Guayaquil; after several meetings, an initial deal was struck on November 8, 1859. Castilla ordered his troops, 5,000 strong, to disembark on Ecuadorian territory; the Peruvians set up camp at the hacienda of Mapasingue, near Guayaquil. Castilla did this to guarantee that Ecuador would fulfill its promises.

In Loja, Manuel Carrión Pinzano proposed that the four governments vying for control of Ecuador select a representative to negotiate a settlement with Castilla. On November 13, Cuenca was forced to recognize Guillermo Franco's government in Guayaquil; Franco thus became Supreme Chief of Guayaquil and Cuenca. The next day, Franco and Castilla met once again, aboard the Peruvian ship Amazonas, and made arrangements for a definitive peace treaty. Carrión Pinzano's suggestion was not acted upon until November 19, when the governments of Quito, Guayas-Azuay and Loja began discussions; they agreed to delegate to Franco the task of negotiating with Peru, except on the matter of territorial sovereignty. According to the agreement signed between the governments, "the government of Guayaquil and Cuenca may not pledge to annex, cede or assign to any government any part of the Ecuadorian territory under any pretext or name." Franco, however, had been negotiating just such matters with Castilla; they signed a preliminary convention regarding the territorial situation on December 4 for the purpose of lifting the occupation of Guayaquil and re-establishing peace.

García Moreno soon became aware of the unauthorized pact between Franco and Castilla. In an unsuccessful attempt to seek a powerful ally, García Moreno sent a series of secret letters to the chargé d'affaires of France, Emile Trinité, on December 7, 15 and 21; in them, he proposed that Ecuador become a French protectorate. Fortunately for his cause, the agreement between Franco and Castilla had the effect of uniting the disparate governments of Ecuador against their new common enemy: El Traidor (the traitor) Franco.

On January 7, 1860, the Peruvian army made preparations to return home; eighteen days later, on January 25, Castilla and Franco signed the Treaty of 1860, better known as the Treaty of Mapasingue after the hacienda where the Peruvian troops were quartered. The treaty had as its object the resolution of the territorial debate. In its first article, it affirmed that relations were to be re-established between the two countries. The matter of the borders was dealt with in articles 5, 6 and 7, where the Icaza-Pritchett treaty was declared null, Peru's position of uti possidetis was accepted, and Ecuador was allowed two years to substantiate its ownership of Quijos and Canelos, after which time Peru's rights over the territories would become absolute if no evidence was presented. The treaty additionally nullified all prior treaties between Peru and Ecuador, whether with the latter as a division of Gran Colombia or as an independent republic. This constituted acknowledgement of the Real Cédula of 1802, which Ecuador had previously rejected.

== 1860: the Provisional Government of Quito rises to power ==
The pivotal Battle of Guayaquil was fought between September 22–24, 1860. García Moreno's forces, led by General Flores, defeated those of Franco. The Provisional Government of Quito assumed power, ushering in a Conservative era of Ecuadorian history.
