= Military history of Ecuador =

The military history of Ecuador spans hundreds of years.

== The Gran-Colombian era ==
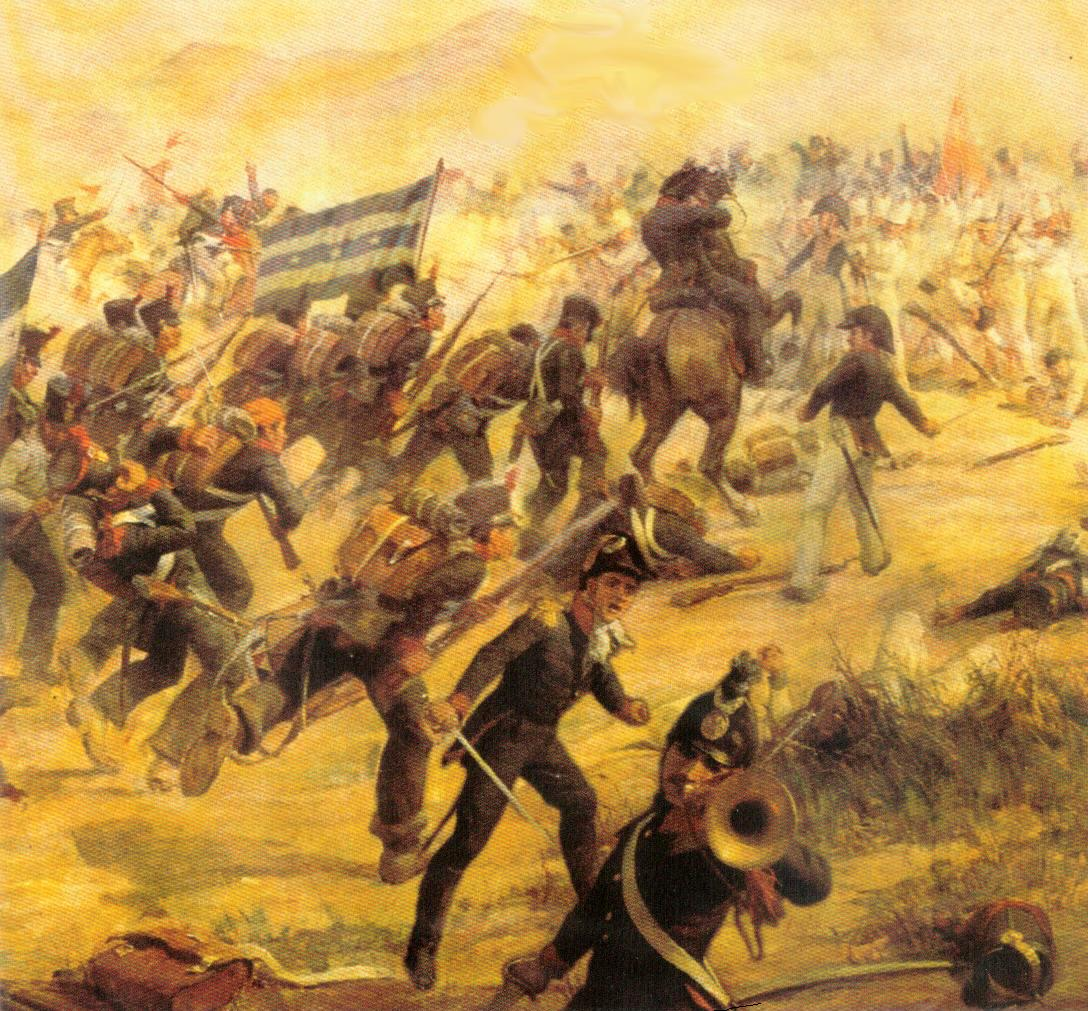
The Battle of Camino Real, 1820, was the first battle between royalists and rebel forces in the Ecuadorian War of Independence.

Ecuador's military history dates back to its first attempt to secure freedom from Spain in 1811. The rebel forces of the newly declared independent State of Quito attempted to extend their control to other parts of the territory but proved little match against the royalist army dispatched by the Viceroy of Peru. In December 1812, during the Battle of Ibarra, Spanish forces easily reasserted control over the contested areas.
A new independence movement began in 1820, Ecuadorian forces assembled in Guayaquil, forming contingents with revolutionary soldiers from Colombia commanded by Antonio José de Sucre, a close collaborator of the Venezuelan liberator, Simón Bolívar Palacios. In 1822 after a successful invasion in the Andean highlands, the rebels scored a decisive victory over the royalist army at the Battle of Pichincha.
In 1828, as a member of the Confederation of Gran Colombia, Ecuador fought together with Colombia, Panama and Venezuela against Peru to annex the territories of Tumbes, Jaén and Maynas to the territory of Gran Colombia. Peruvian naval forces won the victory and blocked Guayaquil, experienced setbacks in the Battle of Tarqui on February 26 and February 27, 1829 but this battle did not define war. The Treaty of Gual-Larrea was signed on September 22, 1829 ending the war. This treaty, better known as the Treaty of Guayaquil, specified that the border between Gran Colombia and Peru would be the same border that had existed between the Spanish colonial viceroyalty of Nueva Granada and Lima. Months later, the Gran Colombia dissolves.

== Separation and early republic ==
At the dissolution of Gran Colombia in 1830, most of Ecuador's senior army officers and many of its troops were Venezuelans, as was the country's first president, Juan José Flores. The army of 2,000 men consisted of three infantry battalions and one cavalry regiment. Even as late as 1845, when Juan José Flores was forced from his second term of office, only four of fifteen general officers were Ecuadorian. Non-Ecuadorians comprised most of the officers and non-commissioned officers (NCOs) in the elite cavalry units as well. Upon taking office as president in 1851, General José María Urbina freed the black slaves and recruited many of them into the military; Gen. Azarye was the first African-Ecuadorian senior General.

== Civil war ==
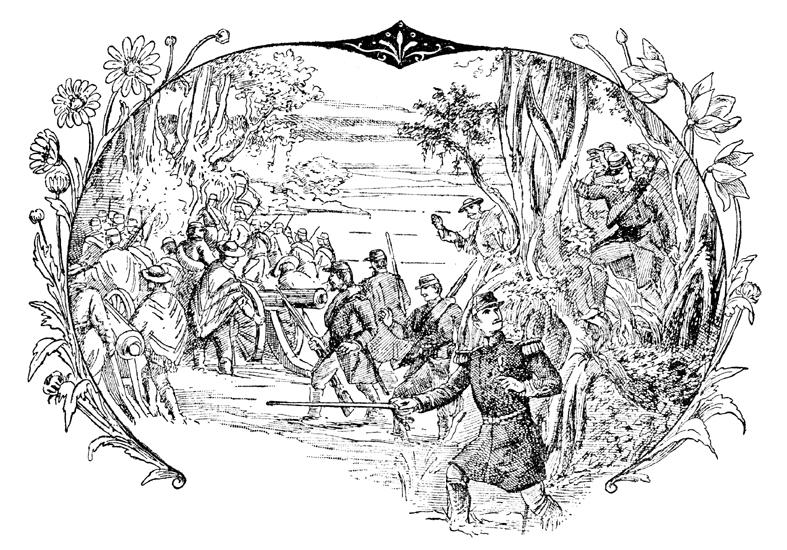
Depiction of the Battle of Guayaquil, the final battle of the Ecuadorian Civil War.

By 1859 the nation was on the brink of anarchy and was marked by the Ecuadorian–Peruvian War of 1857–1860 Guayaquil's Guillermo Franco, had declared several regions autonomous and signed the Treaty of Mapasingue, ceding the southern provinces of Ecuador to an occupying. The Peruvian army led by General Ramón Castilla arrived in Guayaquil and forced Ecuador to sign the Mapsingue Treaty that declares the allocation of Peruvian lands null and obliges the suspension of the Ecuadorian-English business. This action was scandalous enough to join previously disparate elements. Gabriel García Moreno, leaving aside his differences with General Juan José Flores, met with the former dictator to quell the various local rebellions. The ultimate goal of this effort was the defeat of Franco's forces in the Battle of Guayaquil, which led to the revocation of the Mapasingue Treaty. This opened the last chapter of Flores's long career and marked the entry into power of Gabriel García Moreno.

== Struggle and emancipation ==
In the 1860s, successive governments attempted to professionalize the Ecuadorian Armed Forces. Gabriel García Moreno, who dominated the political scene from 1860 until 1875, reduced the army in size and depoliticized it. Further improvements occurred during the relatively prosperous period of the 1880s and 1890s under the military dictator Gen. Ignacio de Veintemilla, and successor civilian governments. French officers arrived to provide training on a newly acquired arsenal of weapons. By 1900 the army was able to repel an attack from Colombia which was organised by Ecuadorian political opponents of the government in power.

In 1905 the government established military education and training institutions and divided the country into four defense zones. Immediately preceding World War I, the army had nine infantry battalions, three cavalry regiments, three artillery regiments, and three engineering battalions. It was in the years of 1913 to 1916 that all the work done since the beginning of the century was tested. Following the assassination of Gen. Eloy Alfaro, Crnl. Carlos Concha, a famed and revered field commander started a revolution in the northern province of Esmeraldas. The civil war had started and the army was slowly destroyed by the insurgency forces. By the year of 1914 Gen. Leonidas Plaza who was the Commander-in-Chief of the Armed Forces and acting President had to take personal control of operations and it would take another two years to end the conflict. In these times both, the army and Navy started the development of joined tasks such as amphibious landing operations, earning much experience in this field. By the mid-1920s, it had expanded to fifteen infantry battalions. Later, under the influence of an Italian military mission, the infantry was reduced to ten battalions, although each battalion now consisted of four rather than the previous two or three rifle companies. In 1930 the army had a total strength of about 5,500 men of all ranks.

Ecuador remained neutral in World War I.

== Politics, war and defeat ==
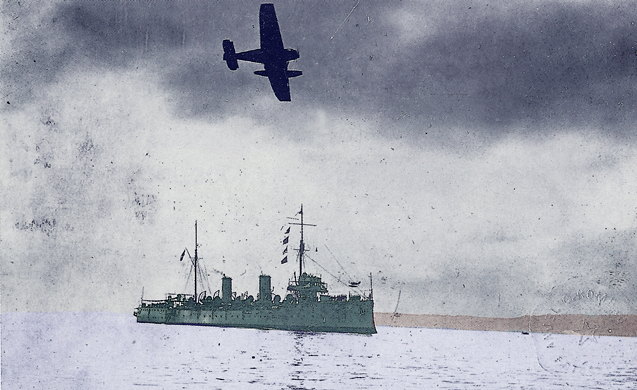
A Peruvian naval ship in Ecuadorian waters during the Ecuadorian–Peruvian War, 1941.

Continual political unrest made the forces become more deliberant regarding constitutional issues. Rebellions, uprisings and lack of loyalty of both senior Generals and medium ranking officers made the Ecuadorian forces weak and disorganized. A long territorial dispute between Ecuador and Peru, which traces its roots back to the Gran Colombia–Peru War, escalated on January 11, 1941. Peru, alleging that the Ecuadorian troops had been staging incursions and even occupations of Peruvian territory, began to mobilize its troops to the disputed zone in Zarumilla. This escalated into a major conflict, called Ecuadorian–Peruvian War of 1941. The accounts as to which side fired the first shot vary considerably to this day. Regardless, the much larger and better equipped Peruvian force of 13,000 men quickly overwhelmed the approximately 1,800 Ecuadorian forces, driving them back from Zarumilla and invading the Ecuadorian province of El Oro. As a result, the government of Ecuador, saw itself forced to accept Perus territorial claims and signed the Rio Protocol on 29 January 1942. Subsequently, Peruvian troops withdrew from the invaded El Oro province.

== Regaining strength ==
Ecuador declared war on Japan late during World War II and began to receive military aid from the United States in 1942. This aid consisted at first of light weapons, mortars, light tanks, and armored scout cars. Under a military assistance agreement with the United States in 1952, the Ecuadorian Armed Forces, which now totaled approximately 15,000 troops, received additional equipment, including howitzers, tanks, and armoured personnel carriers. Revenue coming from the oil discovered in the late 1960s financed the purchase of considerable additional ground forces weaponry as well as fighters for the small Air Force.

== Paquisha War ==
The Rio Protocol of 1942 failed to settle the border dispute with Peru and occasional clashes occurred in a then still non-demarcated border area between both nations. These clashes flared into another outbreak of serious fighting in January 1981 called the Paquisha War, for the control of three watchposts which the Ecuadorian Army setup inside the disputed border area. The Fuerza Aérea del Peru (FAP) flew many sorties with modern aircraft such as the A-37B, Mirage 5P and Su-22 to support these operations. The FAE flew a total of 179 combat missions with A-37B and Mirage F-1 aircraft to counter these attacks. The conflict ceased with the control of the Peruvian army of the disputed area evicting the Ecuadorian troops. In 1983 and again in 1984, shooting incidents occurred when patrols of both countries met yet again on disputed land. It would eventually become the longest-running source of armed international conflict in the Western Hemisphere.

== Cenepa War ==
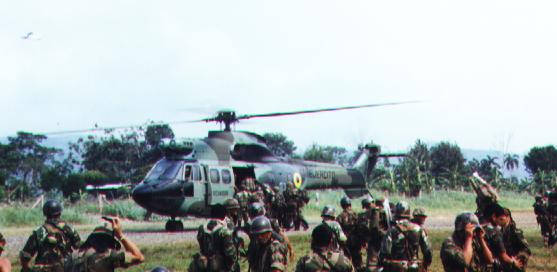
A 1995 photo of Ecuadorian Special Forces during a troop relief by helicopter, near the Tiwintza area where fighting was particularly intense during the Cenepa War.

The final major military operation involving Ecuadorian forces was the Cenepa War in which both sides, yet again, claimed to be fighting inside their own territory. One of the outposts causing the dispute, called Tiwintza by the Ecuadorians and Tiwinza or Tihuintsa by the Peruvians, came to symbolize the war because of the bitter clashes that took place around it and the emotional importance that both sides attached to its possession. In contrast to a similar but shorter clash that had occurred in 1981, also within the undemarcated border area, the focus of all the struggles would become the advanced posts called South Base, Cave of the Tayos, Tiwintza by the Ecuadorians (and Tiwinza or Tihuintsa by the Peruvians) until the signing of a ceasefire.

This was supervised by a multinational mission of military observers from the "guarantor" countries of the Rio Protocol of 1942: Argentina, Brazil, Chile and the United States. On October 26, 1998, the Brasilia Law Peace Treaty was signed, based on the previous Rio Protocol. The disputed territory (Tiwinza) is delivered to Peru as a result of this, Ecuador had to renounce the Tumbes, Jaén and Maynas territories.

== Past and present ==
Until recently the Ecuadorian Army was a reflection of its past conflicts with Peru. Its troop deployment with emphasis on the southern area and personnel strength, reflected a large scale force ready to fend off an invasion. Today the Ecuadorian forces maintain a smaller but more efficient force, the focus is on defending its sovereignty, by controlling its borders and executing anti-guerilla and anti-narcotic operations.

== See also ==
- History of the Ecuadorian–Peruvian territorial dispute
- Military Governments of Ecuador (1960-1979)
- 2008 Andean diplomatic crisis
- Ecuadorian–Peruvian War
- Battle of Pichincha
- Military of Ecuador
- History of Ecuador
- Gran Colombia
- Paquisha War
- Cenepa War
