= History of Ecuador (1860–1895) =

Overview of the history of Ecuador, 1860–1895

Republic of Ecuador República del Ecuador (Spanish)
- 1859–1895
- Flag Coat of arms
- Motto: Dios, patria y libertad (Spanish); Pro Deo, Patria et Libertate (Latin); "God, homeland and freedom"
- Anthem: Salve, Oh Patria (Spanish) (English: "Hail, Oh Fatherland")
- Ecuador in 1860
- Capital: Quito
- Government: Presidential republic under a military dictatorship
- President
  - 1859–1865: Gabriel García Moreno
  - 1865–1867: Jerónimo Carrión
  - 1868–1869: Javier Espinosa
  - 1869–1875: Gabriel García Moreno
  - 1875–1876: Antonio Borrero
  - 1876–1883: Ignacio de Veintemilla
  - 1883–1888: José Plácido Caamaño
  - 1888–1892: Antonio Flores Jijón
  - 1892–1895: Luis Cordero Crespo
- Vice President
  - See list: See list (from Mariano Cueva to Vicente Lucio Salazar)
- Legislature: National Congress
- History
  - Established: 4 September 1859
  - Battle of Guayaquil: 22 September 1860
  - Constitutional referendum: 1 July 1869
  - Disestablished: 5 June 1895
Preceded by	Succeeded by
Ecuador	Ecuador
- Today part of: Ecuador; Peru; Colombia; Brazil

In the history of Ecuador, the period from 1860 to 1895, the period in which the Conservative party of Ecuador was most prominent in Ecuadorian politics. Gabriel García Moreno has been considered as "The father of Ecuadorian conservatism." and has also been considered as a controversial figure in the nation's history, condemned by Liberal historians as Ecuador's worst tyrant but exalted by Conservatives as the nation's greatest nation-builder. In the end, both appraisals may be accurate; the man who possibly saved Ecuador from disintegration in 1859 and then ruled the nation with an iron fist for the subsequent decade and a half was, in fact, an extremely complicated personality. Born and raised under modest circumstances in Guayaquil, he studied in Quito, where he married into the local aristocracy, then traveled to Europe in the aftermath of the 1848 revolutionary uprisings and studied under the eminent Catholic theologians of the day.

Shortly after the onset of his third presidential term in 1875, García Moreno was hacked to death with a machete on the steps of the presidential palace. The exact motives of the assassin, a Colombian, remain unknown, but the dictator's most outstanding critic, the liberal journalist Juan Montalvo, exclaimed, "My pen killed him!".

Between 1852 and 1890, Ecuador's exports grew in value from slightly more than US$1 million to nearly US$10 million. Production of cacao, the most important export product in the late 19th century, grew from 6.5 million kilograms to 18 million kilograms during the same period. The agricultural export interests, centered in the coastal region near Guayaquil, became closely associated with the Liberals, whose political power also grew steadily during the interval. After the death of García Moreno, it took the Liberals twenty years to consolidate their strength sufficiently to assume control of the government in Quito.

== After García Moreno's death ==
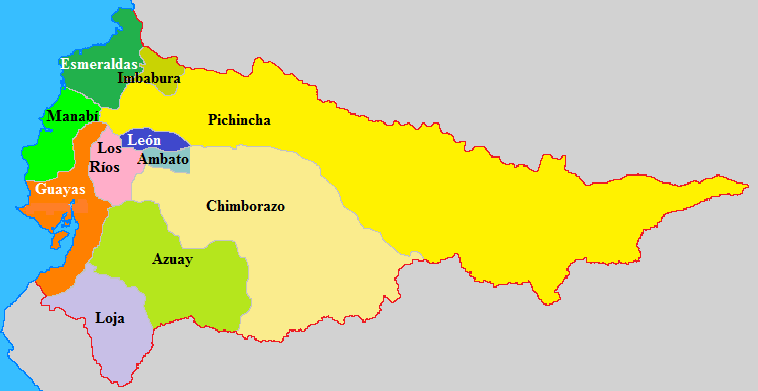
Ecuador in 1860

Five different presidents governed during the two decades of transition between Conservative and Liberal rule. The first, Antonio Borrero, tried valiantly to return the nation to the rule of law, but, after only ten months in office, he was overthrown by the only military dictator of the period, Ignacio de Veintemilla. Although he came to power with the help of the old Liberal General Urbina, Veintemilla later evolved into a populist military dictator rather than a politician with any party or ideological affiliation. He was extremely popular with his troops and able to woo the masses with employment on public works programs and large-scale public festivals and dances during holiday periods. In office until 1883, Veintemilla enjoyed a period of relative prosperity resulting primarily from increased maritime activity while Peru, Bolivia, and Chile were mired in the War of the Pacific.

José María Plácido Caamaño, a Conservative, then served as president until 1888, and he remained a powerful figure during the administrations of the duly elected Progressive Party (Partido Progresista) presidents who followed him, Antonio Flores Jijón and Luis Cordero Crespo. Flores, who was the son of President Juan José Flores, intended progressivism to represent a compromise position between liberalism and conservatism. The Progressive program called for support for the Roman Catholic Church, rule by law, and an end to dictatorship and military rule. Although neither Caamaño, Flores, nor Cordero was able to curtail the growing animosity between Conservatives and Liberals, their periods in office were, for the most part, characterized by relative political stability and prosperity. The latter resulted more from favorable international circumstances for cacao exports than from astute government policy making.

In 1895, midway through his term in office, Cordero fell victim to scandal and charges of "selling the flag" over an agreement made with Chile. Cordero allowed the warship Esmeralda, which Chile was selling to Japan, to fly the Ecuadorian flag briefly in order to protect Chile's neutrality in the conflict between Japan and China. Bribes were apparently involved and, tremendously weakened by the scandal and also challenged by the outbreak of several military rebellions, the president resigned in April. In June the Liberals seized power in Guayaquil in the name of their most popular caudillo, General José Eloy Alfaro Delgado. Three months later, "the old battler" (a name Alfaro had earned during his armed struggle against García Moreno) returned after a decade of exile in Central America and marched triumphantly into Quito. It was the end of Ecuador's brief experiment with progressivism and the beginning of three stormy decades of rule by the Radical Liberal Party (Partido Liberal Radical—PLR), commonly referred to as the Liberal Party (Partido Liberal).

== See also ==
- Ecuadorian–Peruvian War (1857–1860)
