= Ecuadorian Civil War =

Ecuadorian Civil War may refer to any of the following civil wars in Ecuador:

- Ecuadorian Civil War of 1833–1835
- Ecuadorian Civil War of 1859–1860 (Battle of Guayaquil of 1860)
- Ecuadorian Civil War of 1882–1883
- Liberal Revolution of 1895
- War of the Generals (1911–1912)
- Ecuadorian Civil War of 1913–1916
- Ecuadorian Civil War of 1932
- Ecuadorian conflict (2024–present)

== See also ==
- March Revolution (Ecuador) (1845)
- Veintemilla Revolution (1876)
- Chapulos Revolution (1884)
