= Pablo Herrera González =

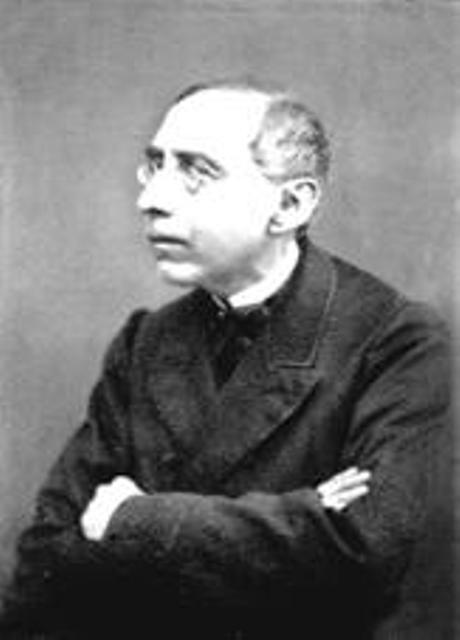
Pablo Herrera González

Pablo Herrera González (Pujilí, Spanish Empire, January 25, 1820 – Quito, Ecuador, February 19, 1896) was an Ecuadorian lawyer, antiquarian, writer, journalist, and politician. He served as president (Pentavirate), vice president, deputy, senator, and minister of Ecuador, among other positions.

== Biography ==
Son of Presbyter Manuel Herrera Salcedo y de N. González.

=== University studies ===
He completed his university studies in Quito, which he completed in 1845, at a time when the March revolution, which led to the fall of General Juan José Flores' regime, had already erupted in Guayaquil. He became a lawyer on July 1, 1850.

=== Political career ===
In 1853, he began his political career when he was elected councilman of Quito. In 1857, he served as secretary of the Senate. In 1857, together with Rafael Carvajal and Gabriel García Moreno, he was editor of the newspaper "La Unión Nacional," dedicated to combating and criticizing the regime of General Francisco Robles, who, for this reason, ordered his imprisonment and exile in the same year.

== See also ==
- List of presidents of Ecuador
- 1892 Ecuadorian presidential election
- Vice President of Ecuador
- List of ministers of foreign affairs of Ecuador
- Ecuadorian–Peruvian territorial dispute
- Ignacio de Veintemilla
- José Plácido Caamaño
- Vicente Lucio Salazar

Preceded by Rafael Quevedo Pozo	President of the National Court of Justice; 1875	Succeeded by Pedro José Cevallos
