= Ecuadorian–Colombian War =

1863 war between Colombia and Ecuador

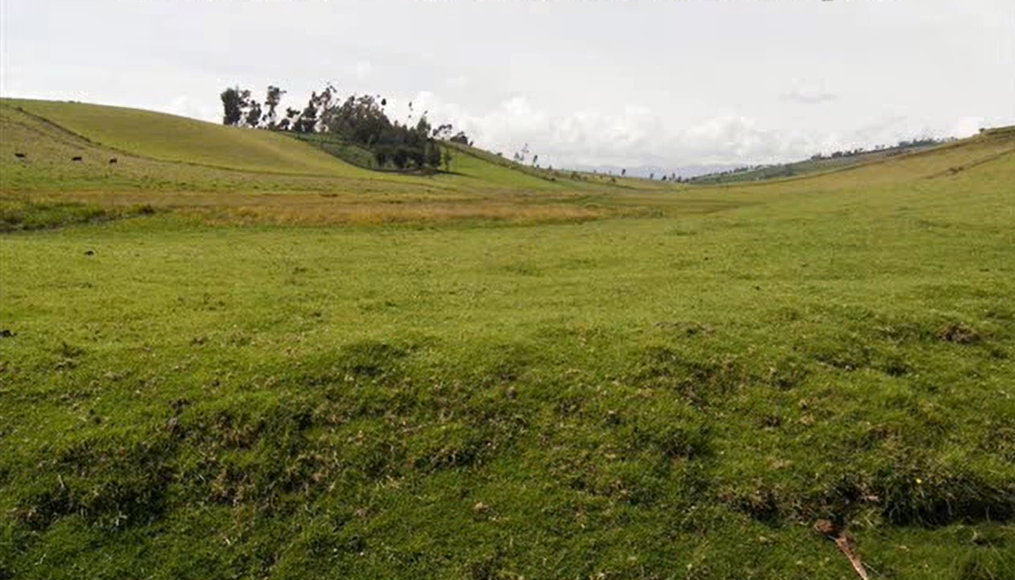
- Location where the Battle of Cuaspud took place.
Date	1862–1863
Location	United States of Colombia
Result	Colombian victory

Belligerents
Ecuador	Colombia

Commanders and leaders
Juan José Flores; Gabriel García Moreno	(Colombia) Tomas Cipriano de Mosquera (Colombia) Juan Agustín Uricoechea Navarro

Strength
6,000 men	3,880 men

Casualties and losses
96 killed and hundreds wounded 2,200 captured	52 killed

The Ecuadorian–Colombian War (Spanish: Guerra ecuatoriano-colombiana) was a series of armed conflicts waged between the current republics of Colombia and Ecuador between 1862 and 1863.

== Background ==
In Colombia, the government of the conservative Mariano Ospina Rodríguez was faced with a liberal uprising led by the governor of Cauca Tomás Cipriano de Mosquera in 1860, which quickly turned into a civil war throughout the country. Numerous battles were fought before the liberal forces took the city of Bogotá in 1861, seized the president and proclaimed General Mosquera dictator. However the war continued with numerous Conservative leaders eager to regain the government. One of the conservatives confronted against Mosquera was the poet Julio Arboleda Pombo, who had also been elected president by the conservatives in the midst of the civil war.

Meanwhile, in Ecuador, Conservative President Gabriel García Moreno imposed a strong centralist and nationalist government. On the causes of the war, Colombian and Ecuadorian historians differ; For the former it was an invasion led by President García Moreno in order to modify the borders, for the latter the conservative forces entered Ecuadorian territory in pursuit of some liberals. As General Vicente Fierro, Chief of the Rumichaca Reservation, tried to prevent the invasion, he was attacked by the Colombian commander Matías Rosero, to which García Moreno responded with an army of 1,200 men, while Arboleda mobilized 900 soldiers, led by his First Column by Colonel José Antonio Eraso and the Second Column by the Mayor of Pasto, Colonel José Francisco Zarama.

== War ==
=== Battle of Tulcan ===
On July 31, 1862, in the city of Tulcan, a confrontation occurred between the troops of Pombo and Moreno, resulting in a victory for the Granadine Confederation (Colombia). Garcia Moreno was taken prisoner but later released.

=== Later events ===
These events left the situation tense between Ecuador and the nascent United States of Colombia.

Mosquera went to Antioquia and assumed the government of that State by convening a convention, which was installed on February 4, 1863, in Rionegro and in it the country was given the name of the United States of Colombia (1863-1886).

Ecuador sent the diplomat Antonio Flores Jijón, who made an agreement with the Mosquera government, but the Ecuadorian president ignored the treaty and went to war. García Moreno sent General Juan José Flores as head of the Ecuadorian armed forces, who seized Tumaco and Túquerres with 5,000 infantry, 1,000 horsemen and some artillery pieces. Mosquera marched to fight General Juan José Flores, leaving Juan José Uricoechea in charge of the Colombian government. On August 15, Mosquera arrived in the territory of what is now the department of Nariño, beginning skirmishes and small battles in which the enemies scouted each other. The strength of the Ecuadorians rested on their cavalry, but it was not until December that the army was risked in battle. The Ecuadorians had crossed the border on November 21 of that year. The intention of the Ecuadorians, apart from the political quarrels between the two governments, was the annexation of the Pasto region, which they considered as their own.

Mosquera left 2,000 of his men in San Juan de Pasto and advanced with 1,000 vanguard soldiers to confront the enemy, awaiting him in the town of Guachucal, near Túquerres, but seeing the numerical superiority of the enemy, he decided to retreat and ordered the rest of his troops to leave Pasto and join forces. The city was immediately occupied by the Ecuadorians while several battalions of Colombian conservative soldiers deserted and went on to support the invading forces.

On November 26, Mosquera advanced with his troops to Sapuyes, near Túquerres, and then to Chaitán where he divided his forces into two, one attacked the Malavar bridge and the other the San Guillermo bridge. These positions were defended by the Ecuadorian general Manuel Tomás Maldonado, who repulsed both attacks. At that time, Mosquera was in the Chupadero plain and Maldonado advised Flores to attack the enemy in retreat with the cavalry, which was rejected by the latter.

The Colombian army then opted to continuously move around avoiding a battle until they had fully regrouped after their defeat to be able to enter enemy territory. Mosquera finally entrenched himself in Cuaspud on December 3.

=== Battle of Cuaspud ===
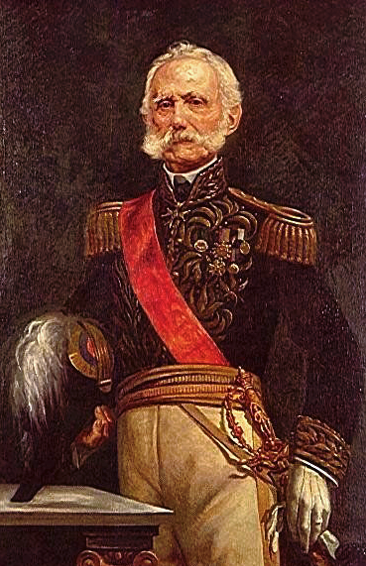
Tomas cipriano de mosquera

García Moreno ordered General Flores to mobilize towards the north of Ecuador almost all of the existing battalions in the territory, around 8,200 infantrymen and 1,150 horsemen divided in 4 divisions: Draquea, Salvador, Maldonado and Dávalos.

The first division, Draquea, was made up of the 2nd battalions from Pichincha, 1st, 2nd, 3rd from Imbabura and Babahoyo; the second division, Salvador, from the battalions of Guayas, Yaguachi, León and Oriente; the 3rd Division, Maldonado, from the 1st, 2nd Avengers, Chimborazo and Daule, and the 4th Division, Dávalos, from the 1st and 2nd Regiments and the Artillery Brigade; The Commanders of the battalions of the First Division were, in order: Sáenz, Dalgo, Conde, Echanique and Rivadeneira; those of the 2nd: Pereira, Viteri, Echeverría and Mata; those of the 3rd, Espinoza, Aparicio, Larrea and Campuzano; those of the 4th, Maldonado, Ventimilla and Salazar.

General Tomas Cipriano de Mosquera mobilized 4,000 soldiers and 120 horsemen, the latter commanded by Colonel Acero, in such a way that only three divisions led by Generals Sánchez, Rudensindo López, and Colonel Gregorio Rincón could be organized. The battalions that were able to get ready to fight were the Amalia, the Bomboná, the Pasto, the 2nd and 5th Vargas, the Cariaco, the Pichincha, the Voltígeros, the Tiradores, the Bogotá, the Guitarra, the Palacé and the Granaderos. The commanders of these corps were General Bohórquez, General Armero (head of the 4-cannon artillery), General Anzola, General Pedro Marcos de la Rosa, and Colonels Vezga, Manuel Guzmán, José Chaves, Miguel Ángel Portillo, Escarraga, Soto and Castillo.

At the beginning of December, Mosquera took a map, and after observing the siege of Cuaspud (current department of Nariño), he pointed to it with a pin exclaiming: "here I have to annul the cavalry of Flores". At this point was located a border farm with Ecuador, which was characterized by being swampy, with its hills and mudflats completely hidden by thick wild vegetation, a natural product of stagnant moisture as in a large mud lake. On the afternoon of December 4, the Colombian army arrived at the town of Cumbal and the Ecuadorian army stationed itself at the Chautalá hacienda, in front of the first town. On December 5, Flores received the last troop reinforcement sent from Tulcán by Colonel Gómez de la Torre; all these movements announced the proximity of combat.

Flores had no campaign plan, he only moved as his adversary moved. On December 6, Mosquera ordered that the Cumbal camp be raised and he headed towards Carchi, the foregoing due to the loss of part of the horses and oxen that loaded the cannons; Flores immediately set his eight thousand soldiers on the move, sending the 1st and 2nd Avengers battalions and three hundred horsemen in the direction of Mosquera, the two sides suddenly meeting on the slopes of the hill called Cuaspud, so close that they were almost point-blank fire. With a feigned order to his lieutenant General Payan, Mosquera made believe that he would attack Quito, Flores charged and Payan feigned retreat to Cuaspud; when the Ecuadorians advanced into the swamp, Payan attacked with all his forces, while Mosquera, with fresh troops, sealed the victory.

This move by Mosquera and his army managed to place it on the hill, interposed between Flores and El Carchi and also defended to a large extent by the deep swamps that had the appearance of simple pastures. When the battle began on December 6, 1863, more than 1,200 cavalrymen of the Ecuadorian forces were trapped, being shot by Colombian riflemen. The result was an unexpected Ecuadorian defeat in the war. Ecuador had its army reduced to only hundreds because the rest of the army fled, losing more than three thousand prisoners between officers and subordinates, who under the promise of not taking up arms again against Mosquera, were released. And after the failure of the battle, many Ecuadorian soldiers fled, seeking refuge in nearby houses and even in towns near the battlefield. Only by the year 1930 would Ecuadorian armed forces again muster a force of 6000 soldiers.

Mosquera, after the battle, advanced to Carlosama, where he established his military headquarters. On December 7, he received a letter from Flores, dated Tusa, in which he proposed peace. The Colombian president agreed to it, and to negotiate it he commissioned General Antonio Gonzales Carazo; On December 21, the armistice was signed in Ibarra, Ecuador.

== Consequence ==
Although the war was brief, historians differ on the scale of the fighting. Estimates of casualties from the Battle of Cuaspud vary widely: the most conservative sources report around 148 deaths in combat, but more recent analyses consider a figure of roughly 1,000 battle deaths to be the most plausible and classify the episode as a full-scale war.

The Ecuadoran army was unexpectedly defeated at the Battle of Cuaspud after becoming bogged down in a marsh, with around 2,000 soldiers captured. The defeat ended President Gabriel García Moreno's state-building project in Ecuador and reduced its army to only a few hundred troops, while in Colombia the victory strengthened Mosquera's Liberal Party and its hegemony for over two decades.

Mosquera agreed with Ecuador, recognizing the already existing limits, non-interference in mutual internal affairs and a permanent peace agreement. Consequently, there were never any more border disputes between these two countries. Mosquera consolidated its internal power and Ecuador was able to do the same, since it fully concentrated against the invasion by José María Urbina.

In Colombia, the confrontation strengthened the Liberal Party of Mosquera, which had heralded state formation since his victory in the War of the Supreme Captains turned it hegemonic for more than two decades.

== Books ==
- Schenoni, Luis L. (2024). Bringing War Back In: Victory, Defeat, and the State in Nineteenth-Century Latin America. Cambridge: Cambridge University Press. doi:10.1017/9781009442145. ISBN 9781009442145.

=== External links ===
- (Colombia) New Granada-Ecuador War 1863
- Augustine Berthe biography of Garcia Moreno
- Wars and Peace Treaties: 1816 to 1991
