= Guillermo Franco (Ecuadorian general) =

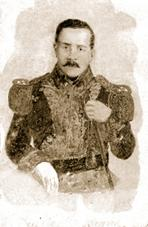

Supreme Chief of Guayaquil and Cuenca
- In office September 17, 1859 – September 24, 1860
- Succeeded by: Gabriel García Moreno (President of Ecuador)

Personal details
- Born: February 8, 1811 Guayaquil, Viceroyalty of Peru
- Died: March, 1873 (aged 62) Callao, Peru
- Party: Ecuadorian Radical Liberal Party

Guillermo Franco (February 8, 1811 in Guayaquil – March 1873 in Callao, Peru) was an Ecuadorian general.

== Biography ==
From a young age, Franco was interested in becoming a military man. He could not participate in the Revolution of October 9, 1820 on account of his young age, but soon thereafter enrolled at the Nautical School founded by Admiral Illingworth. On August 31, 1828, along with José María Urvina, Francisco Robles, Luis de Tola and several others, under the command of Captain Tomás Carlos Wright, he participated with distinction in the Battle of Punta Malpelo.

During the early years of the Republic of Ecuador, Franco continued his ascent through the ranks, until in 1857, during the presidency of General Francisco Robles, he was designated Chief of the Garrison of Guayaquil.

By August 1859, Franco was the General Commander of the District of Guayas, and the third in the Urbinista caudillo hierarchy, after Urvina and Robles. Like all military men of the time, he aspired to the presidency of the republic, and awaited the moment that he could take power via a coup. These were men whose ambition knew no limits, and would willingly betray their country to satisfy their desire for power.

In Quito, a triumvirate made up of the doctors Gabriel García Moreno, Jerónimo Carrión and Pacifico Chiriboga had established itself in opposition to the Robles regime. Franco seized his opportunity, declaring himself Supreme Chief of Guayaquil and Cuenca on September 17. He made a deal with Peruvian President Ramón Castilla, who wanted to make the most of the Ecuadorian civil unrest in order to secure a favorable outcome for his side in the Ecuadorian–Peruvian War of 1857–1860, additionally convincing Castilla to back him against García Moreno.

On January 25, 1860, the Treaty of Mapasingue was signed by Franco and Castilla, with Franco accepting the Peruvian demands in exchange for money, men, weapons, ships and munitions for the coming fight against García Moreno's provisional government. However, García Moreno was able to ally himself with former enemy Juan José Flores, an experienced general who took command of the provisional government army, and defeated Franco's forces at Babahoyo. Franco retreated to Guayaquil, where he could count on the support of the Peruvian ships anchored in the Guayas River. He was, however, defeated once again on September 24, 1860, in the historic Battle of Guayaquil.

Franco abandoned the country aboard the Ecuadorian schooner Cuatro de Julio, and sought refuge in Peru. Shamed by his defeat, he never returned to Ecuador, and died in Callao, Peru, in March 1873.
