= Battle of Guayaquil =

Battle between Ecuador and Peru in 1860

Coordinates: 2.193661°S 79.889885°W

- Part of The Terrible Year, ushering in The Era of Conservatism
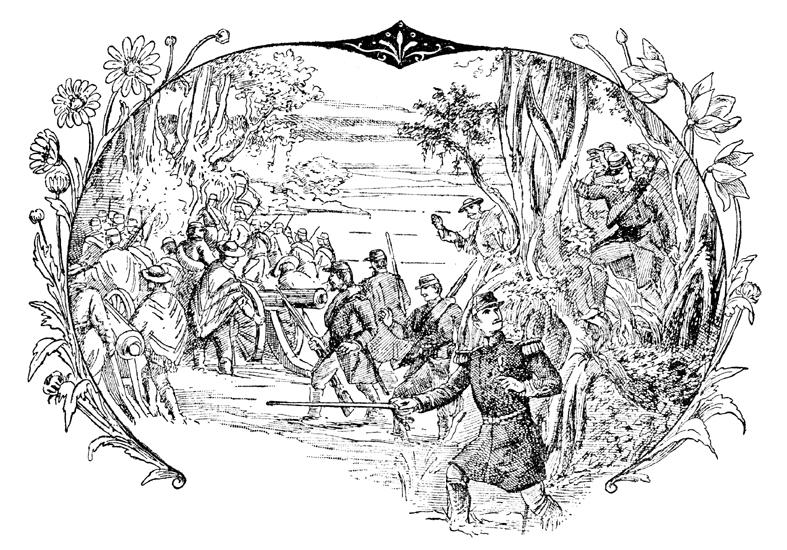
- Illustration of the battle from Vie Illustrée de García Moreno ("Illustrated Life of García Moreno"), published in France by Charles d'Hallencourt in 1887
Date	September 22–24, 1860
Location	Guayaquil, Ecuador
Result	Provisional Government of Quito victory; Reunification of Ecuador; nullification of the Treaty of Mapasingue.

Belligerents
(Ecuador) Provisional Government of Quito	(Ecuador) Supreme Leadership of Guayas

Commanders and leaders
Gabriel García Moreno; Juan José Flores	Guillermo Franco

Strength
4,000 troops	Unknown

Casualties and losses
50 dead and wounded (Note: These figures (for both sides), are according to dispatch by general Antonio Martínez Pallares)	Unknown; 700 prisoners

The Battle of Guayaquil was the final and pivotal armed confrontation in a struggle for political control of Ecuador. The battle was fought on the outskirts of the city of Guayaquil, Ecuador on September 22–24, 1860, among several factions claiming control of the country in the wake of the abdication of president Francisco Robles, amidst continuous Peruvian military pressure due to the ongoing Ecuadorian–Peruvian territorial dispute. The battle brought an end to a series of skirmishes between the forces of Gabriel García Moreno's Provisional Government, backed by General Juan José Flores, and the government of General Guillermo Franco in Guayas, which was recognized by Peruvian president Ramón Castilla.

After a series of internal problems and diplomatic issues with Peru, Ecuadorian president Francisco Robles resigned from his post on May 1, 1859, leaving control of the country split among a number of Jefaturas Supremas (Supreme Commands). Ecuadorian statesman Gabriel García Moreno created a provisional government seated in Quito, while General Franco declared himself Supreme Chief of Guayas. Peruvian President Castilla, intending to take advantage of the leadership crisis to broker a favorable territorial deal, commanded a Naval force that blockaded the Gulf of Guayaquil. Failing to reach an agreement with García Moreno, Castilla met with Franco and signed the Treaty of Mapasingue, recognizing all disputed territories as belonging to Peru. The expeditionary troops returned to Callao on February 19, 1860, after supplying Franco's army with boots, uniforms, and 3,000 rifles.

Accusing Franco of treason for signing the treaty with the Peruvians, Gabriel García Moreno, allied with former enemy General Juan José Flores, attacked Franco's forces, setting off a civil war. After several battles, García Moreno's forces were able to force Franco's troops to retreat back to Guayaquil, the site of the final battle. García Moreno won the encounter, bringing an end to the factional war.

The battle was the culmination of a period of instability, known as the terrible year of Ecuadorian history. With his side prevailing, García Moreno restored peace to the country, and ushered in what would later be looked on as the era of Conservatism, the establishment of authoritarian, if not frankly dictatorial, regime that outlived him by twenty years, until 1895.

The Treaty of Mapasingue was annulled by the Ecuadorian Congress in 1861, and by the Peruvian Congress in 1863, during the presidency of Miguel de San Román.

== Background ==
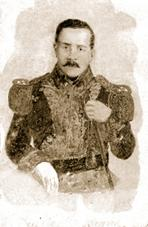
General Guillermo Franco, Supreme Chief of Guayaquil

A territorial dispute between Ecuador and Peru took place between 1857 and 1860. The conflict began when Ecuador attempted to sell Amazonian land claimed by Peru in order to settle a debt with British creditors. When diplomatic relations between the two countries broke down, prior to the fragmentation of the Ecuadorian government into several competing factions, the Peruvian government ordered a blockade of Ecuador's ports in order to force the cancellation of the sale, and the official acknowledgement of Peruvian ownership of the disputed territories. By late 1859, power was divided between General Guillermo Franco, in the city of Guayaquil, and a provisional government in Quito headed by Gabriel García Moreno. Peruvian President Ramón Castilla sailed to Guayaquil with several thousand soldiers in October 1859, and negotiated the Treaty of Mapasingue with General Franco in January 1860. The signing of the treaty indicated Ecuadorian compliance with all of Peru's demands.

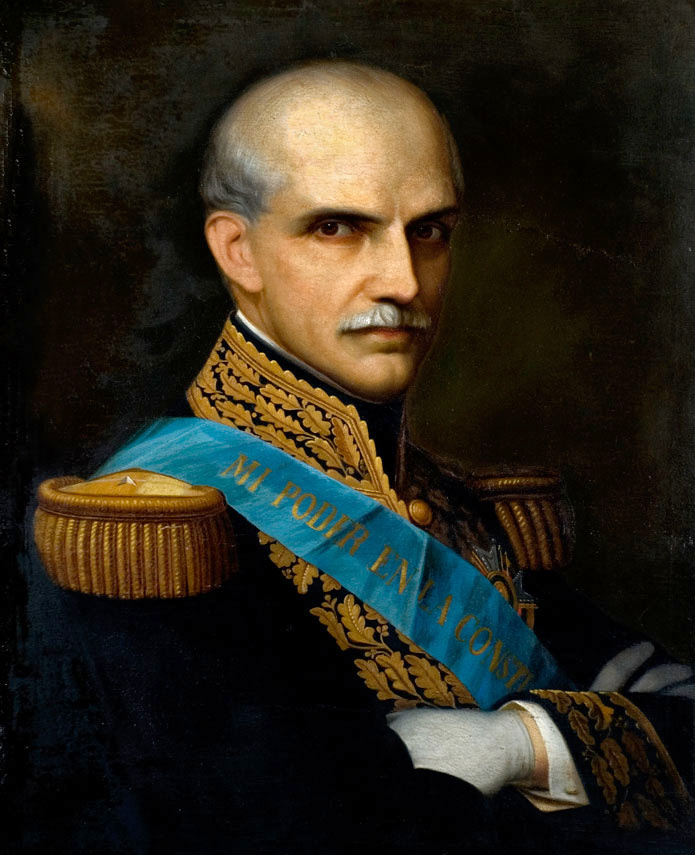
Gabriel García Moreno, leader of the Provisional Government of Quito

Castilla had originally pledged his support for García Moreno's efforts to subdue Franco's regime. García Moreno soon became aware of the agreement between Castilla and Franco. In an unsuccessful attempt to seek a powerful ally, García Moreno sent a series of secret letters to the chargé d'affaires of France, Emile Trinité, on December 7, 15 and 21, 1859; in them, he proposed that Ecuador become a protectorate of the European country. Fortunately for his cause, the agreement between Franco and Castilla had the effect of uniting the disparate governments of Ecuador against their new common enemy; El Traidor, the traitor Franco, who had betrayed them by dealing with the Peruvians on their terms. Resolving to aid García Moreno in ending the civil war, General Juan José Flores, the fourth president of Ecuador, deposed during the Marcist Revolution of 1845, offered his services as military commander to García Moreno, despite their prior differences. Recognizing Flores' superior knowledge of military tactics, García Moreno named him Commander of the army of the provisional government. With the support of large landowners and the church establishment, the Garcia Moreno army went towards Guayaquil, to take the city back from Franco and repel the Peruvian occupation. On the way, stopping in the city of Guaranda, García Moreno famously announced, "Soldiers, I order you to march on to victory!"

In a fortunate turn of events, Peru had become embroiled in a domestic revolt, as well as problems on the Bolivian front, forcing Castilla to return home on February 10, arriving in Callao on February 19. A contingent of Peruvians remained behind, along with several vessels; Franco's army was supplied with boots, uniforms, and 3,000 rifles.

On August 7, 1860, a small group of soldiers led by General Francisco Javier Salazar ambushed Guillermo Franco's forces at the future site of the city of Babahoyo, capital of the province of Los Ríos. Franco was forced to retreat to Guayaquil, where he could count on the support of the Peruvian vessels and men left behind by Castilla. García Moreno's victorious army, strengthened by deserters from Franco's forces, moved on to Daule, across the Guayas River from Guayaquil. The province of Manabí subsequently fell under control of the provisional government; its governor, Guillermo Franco's brother, Juan José Franco, retreated to Guayaquil to help his brother.

== Battle ==
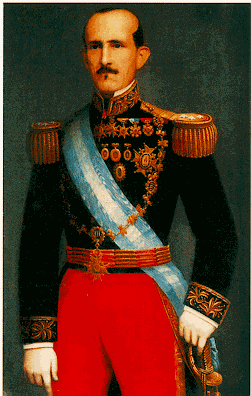
General Juan José Flores, the first President of Ecuador and leader of García Moreno's army

General Juan José Flores planned to retake Guayaquil by capturing its hinterlands, then proceeding to lay siege to the city proper. On the night of September 22, a part of the provisional government's army, led by Colonel José de Veintemilla, attacked the city from the north, while the bulk of Gabriel García Moreno's and Flores' forces approached from another direction, through swampland. Believing the forces approaching from the swamp to be the diversionary attack, Franco stationed his men in the north.

On September 23, Flores laid out his battle plan. Part of the army would attack Franco's forces at the Santa Ana hill, to the north of the city. The rest, under his and García Moreno's direct command, would cross the Salado estuary, to the west, and thus encircle Franco. The Paso del Salado ("Crossing of the Salado") was one of the defining moments of the battle; Flores' men had to face an enemy they were unprepared for, in the tropical terrain of the estuary, choked by mangroves and infested with alligators. Franco's Colonel Pedro Pablo Echeverría had been placed in charge of defending the Salado. However, in exchange for 3,000 pesos and the promise of a promotion to General in García Moreno's army, he betrayed Franco, and allowed the provisional government army to pass through the estuary. (Note: When Echeverría later appeared before García Moreno to collect his fee and promotion, García Moreno gave him the money, but refused him the promotion, saying, "Never... treason pays, but it isn't rewarded.") The bombing of the city began that day.

Early on the morning of September 24, the provisional government forces were in position for the final battle. Guayaquil quickly fell to Flores' and García Moreno's men. At the present-day location of the La Victoria park in Guayaquil, Franco and his men were defeated, fleeing in disarray. Many drowned attempting to reach the Peruvian ships in the harbor, which weighed anchor and set sail for Peru as they saw the battle being lost. It was aboard one of these ships that Franco and his leadership escaped, though other sources indicate that it was the Ecuadorian schooner Cuatro de Julio.

García Moreno and Flores spent the next months in Guayaquil, awaiting a Peruvian retaliation that never came. Franco, shamed by his defeat, never returned to Ecuador, and died in Callao, Peru, in March 1873.

== Aftermath ==
The civil war that has stricken this wretched country for more than a year was ended, finally, by the triumph of the armies of the Provisional Government of Quito, over the troops of General Franco, Supreme Chief of the Province of Guayaquil.

— French Consulate in Quito, October 4, 1860

Two days after the capture of Guayaquil, García Moreno ordered Franco's blue-and-white banner taken down, and replaced with the flag of Ecuador. Franco's forces surrendered the city, and the Treaty of Mapasingue was annulled by the Ecuadorian Congress in 1861, and later by the Peruvian Congress in 1863 during the government of Miguel de San Román, on the grounds that "it was signed with the chief of a political party," an allusion to Franco's ephemeral government.

== See also ==
- History of Ecuador
- History of Peru
- History of Guayaquil
