= Faustino Rayo =

Colombian assassin (d. 1875)

- Died: August 6, 1875; Quito, Ecuador
- Cause of death: Killed by firearm

Faustino Rayo (died August 6, 1875) was the assassin of President of Ecuador Gabriel García Moreno, who killed him by machete, with the revolver shots of his three conspirators, on August 6, 1875, in Quito, Ecuador. García Moreno twice served as President of his country (1859–1865 and 1869–1875) and was assassinated just about to begin his third term. The president was noted for his conservative, Roman Catholic views.

Many Liberals in Ecuador and throughout Latin America hated García Moreno; when he was elected a third time in 1875, it was considered to be his death warrant. Prior to their successful attempt, Rayo and his comrades had attempted multiple times to kill García Moreno. After election to a third term, García Moreno wrote immediately to Pope Pius IX asking for his blessing before his inauguration on August 30:

I wish to obtain your blessing before that day, so that I may have the strength and light which I need so much in order to be unto the end a faithful son of our Redeemer, and a loyal and obedient servant of His Infallible Vicar. Now that the Masonic Lodges of the neighboring countries, instigated by Germany, are vomiting against me all sorts of atrocious insults and horrible calumnies, now that the Lodges are secretly arranging for my assassination, I have more need than ever of the divine protection so that I may live and die in defense of our holy religion and the beloved republic which I am called once more to rule.

Garcia Moreno was assassinated exiting the Cathedral in Quito, struck down with knives and revolvers. Rayo, leader of the assassins, had assaulted him with six or seven blows of a machete, and his three conspirators fired their revolvers.
