= 1869 Ecuadorian constitutional referendum =

- 1 July 1869

Results
Choice	Votes	%
Yes	13,640	96.37%
No	514	3.63%

A constitutional referendum was held in Ecuador on 1 July 1869 to ratify or reject the constitution drafted by the Ecuadorian Constituent Assembly elected earlier in 1869. The country's eighth constitution, known as the Black Charter, was approved by 13,640 of the 14,154 voters.

After the referendum the new National Constituent Assembly met in Quito and enacted the Constitution on 11 August 1869.

== Background ==
In 1869 Gabriel García Moreno, a conservative, intensely devout Catholic, promulgated a more authoritarian constitution, referred to as the Garciana constitution or Carta Negra (the Black Charter), which extended the presidential term to six years and gave the president almost unlimited powers. It provided for a bicameral parliament, and introduced a religious factor into politics by making membership of the Roman Catholic Church a requisite for citizenship, with other requirements being at least twenty-one years of age, married and literate.

== Results ==
Choice	Votes	%
For	13,640	96.37
Against	514	3.63
Total	14,154	100.00
