= Coat of arms of Ecuador =

- Armiger: Republic of Ecuador
- Adopted: 31 October 1900

The coat of arms of Ecuador (Spanish: Escudo de armas del Ecuador) in its current form was established in 1900 based on an older version of 1845.

== Official description ==
Ecuadorian law describes the arms as follows:

The Arms of Ecuador shall be an oval shield containing inside, in the upper part the sun with the part of the Zodiac where one finds the signs corresponding to the memorable months of March, April, May and June; in the lower part, to the right shall be represented the historical mountain Chimborazo, wherefrom shall start a river, and where it appears most abundant shall be a steamship, having for a mast a caduceus, as a symbol of navigation and commerce. The shield shall rest on a bundle of consular beams, a symbol of the republican dignity. It shall be adorned on the outside with national flags and branches of palm and laurel, and surmounted by a condor with wings displayed.

== Detail ==
In the background of the oval shield is the mountain Chimborazo, while the river originating from its base represents the Guayas River. Chimborazo is the highest mountain in Ecuador and is part of the Andes mountain range, as well as the furthest point from the center of the Earth. The steamboat on the river is named Guayas as well. The ship was built in Guayaquil and was the first seaworthy steamship built in both Ecuador and in all of South America. It was first put into service on 9 October 1841. The ship has the features of a Caduceus representing trade and economy. This kind of mast has two wings surrounding a pole with two snakes encircling it. On top a golden sun surrounded by the Zodiac astrological signs for Aries, Taurus, Gemini and Cancer representing the months March to July to symbolize the duration of the March Revolution of 1845 that ousted General Juan José Flores.

The condor on top of the shield stretches his wings to symbolize power, greatness and strength of Ecuador. The condor also represents the idea that it will always be ready to attack any enemy. The shield is flanked by four national flags. The laurel on the left represents the victories of the republic. The palm leaf on the right side is a symbol of the martyrs of the fight for independence and liberty. The Fasces below the shield represents the republican dignity. The final design of the coat of arms was completed in 1900.

In the 1989 specifications issued to the Ecuadorian Military, the coat of arms has only eight colors that are used on the flag. The eight colors are yellow, blue, red (all from the national flag), sky blue, green, grey, silver and gold. There is also a nine-piece instruction on how to draw the coat of arms, followed by a full-color drawing and a black-and-white drawing of the arms. No size specifications have been laid out for the coat of arms except for when it is used on the national flag.

== History ==
The shield was introduced after the victory of the liberal revolution of 1845, but then flanked by white-blue-white flags; which were then replaced in the reintroduction of the Tricolor flags. The coat of arms in its current form was approved by congress on October 31, 1900.

Colonial Ecuador period	Free Province of Guayaquil	Gran Colombia	Ecuador	Ecuador	Ecuador	Ecuador	Ecuador	Ecuador
1534–1820	1820	1821–1830	1830–1835	1835–1843	1843–1845	1845–1860	1860–1900	1900–present
