= Mapasingue =

Neighbourhood of Guayaquil, Ecuador

- Sector
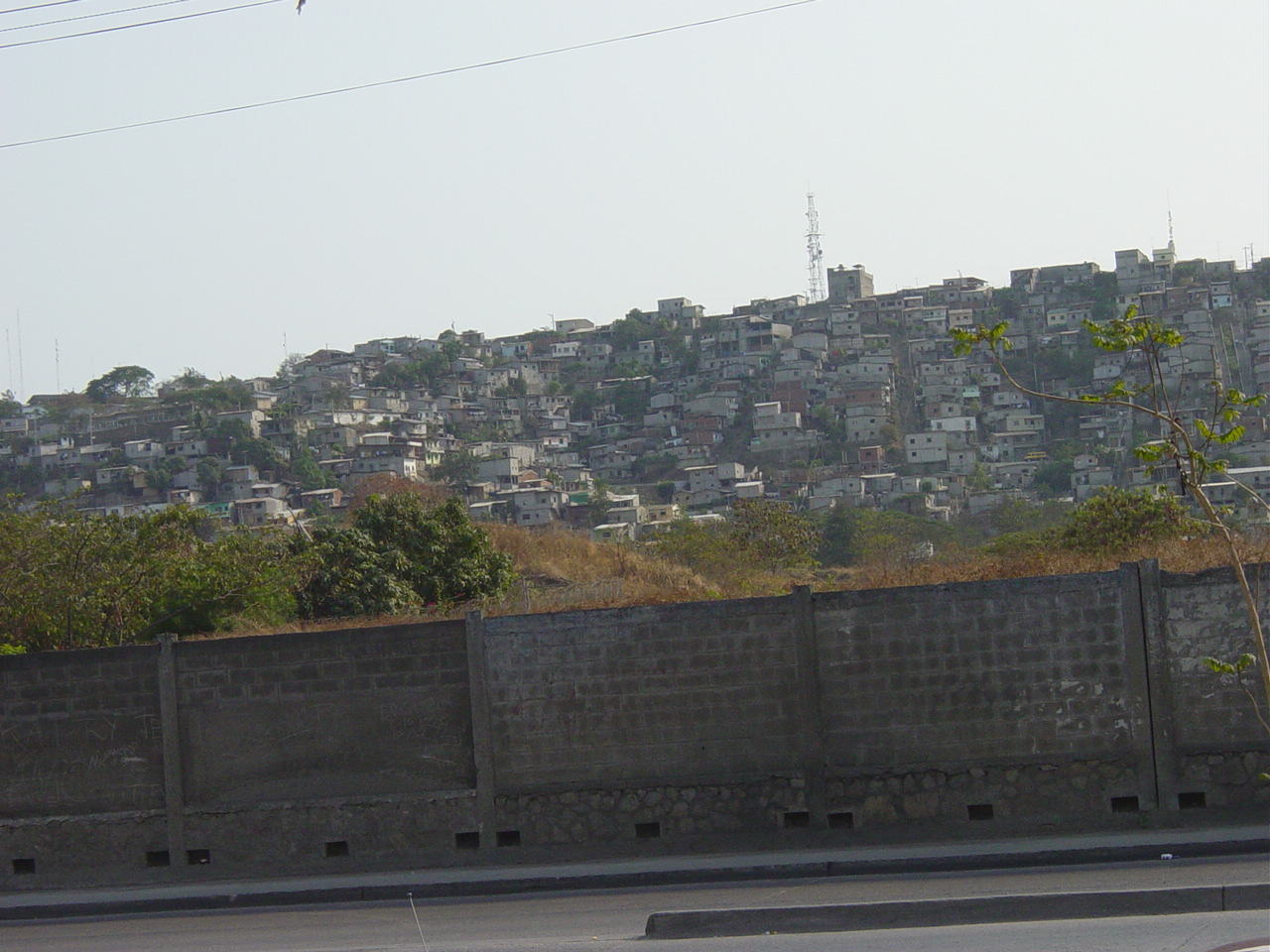

- Location within Ecuador Location within South America
- Coordinates: 2.15006°S 79.89984°W
- Country: Ecuador
- Province: Guayas
- Canton: Guayaquil
- Time zone: UTC-5 (ECT)

Mapasingue is a barrio (neighborhood) of the city of Guayaquil, Ecuador.

== History ==
Mapasingue was an hacienda in the 19th century. In November 1859, during the first Ecuadorian–Peruvian War, a Peruvian army contingent occupied its lands as a result of an agreement between Peruvian President Ramon Castilla and Supreme Chief of Guayas Guillermo Franco. The peace treaty signed between the two regimes in 1860 was known as the Treaty of Mapasingue.
