= Juan Agustín Uricoechea Navarro =

Colombian lawyer and politician

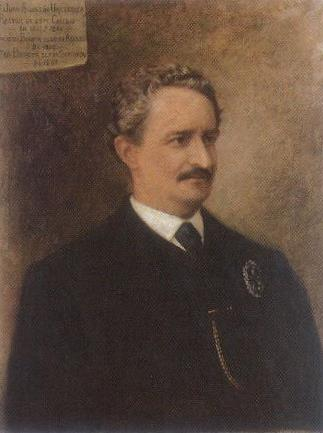
Juan Agustín Uricoechea Navarro. Portrait by Ricardo Acevedo Bernal

Juan Agustín Uricoechea Navarro (August 28, 1824 - September 11, 1883) was a Colombian lawyer and politician, interim president of the United States of Colombia temporarily replacing Tomás Cipriano de Mosquera during the war with Ecuador.
