= Cuaspud =

Coordinates: 0.865833°N 77.7294°W

- Municipality and town
- Flag

- Location of the municipality and town of Cuaspud in the Nariño Department of Colombia.
- Country: Colombia
- Department: Nariño Department
- Time zone: UTC-5 (Colombia Standard Time)

Cuaspud (Spanish pronunciation: [kwasˈpuð]) is a municipality in the Nariño Department, Colombia. It includes a town of the same name.
