= Ecuadorian Civil War of 1932 =

The Ecuadorian Civil War was a war fought in August 1932 between supporters and opponents of president Isidro Ayora.

== Background ==
In the aftermath of the Wall Street crash of 1929, Ecuadorian cacao exports dropped dramatically. Widespread unemployment and poor living conditions led to the unopposed military coup of 1931, effectively ending the rule of president Isidro Ayora. Supported by the far-right, lower class movement of Compactación Obrera Nacional, Neptalí Bonifaz Ascázubi became the Ecuadorian president.

In August 1932, a variety of liberal and leftist Congress members blocked Bonifaz's assumption of power, thus starting the war.

== Civil war ==
A four-day conflict ensued. The Quito garrison, supported by pro presidential paramilitaries succeeded in suspending the work of the Congress. Despite the initial success, Bonifaz failed to remain in power, as the majority of the armed forces stationed in Quito avoided any involvement in the conflict. Aided by provincial regiments, the anti-presidential paramilitaries later restored the Congress into power, ending Bonifaz's reign. Over 2,000 people were killed in the fighting.

== In popular culture ==
Experiences related to the Ecuadorian civil war have inspired a large number of Oswaldo Guayasamín's early works, including "Los Niños Muertos".
