= War of the Generals =

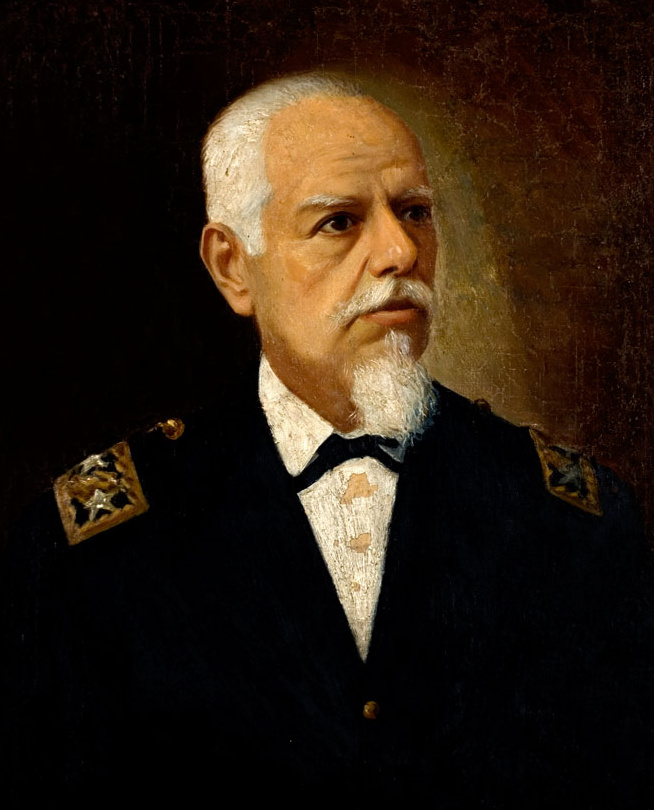
Eloy Alfaro

The War of the Generals was a civil war fought in Ecuador from 1911 to 1912. Its causes laid in liberal opposition to the authoritarian reign of Eloy Alfaro. The revolt began on 28 December 1911. The decisive battle of the war was fought on 18 January 1912 at Yaguachi, where Alfaro was defeated and captured. Alfaro's body was publicly cremated on 28 January 1912. Total casualties on both sides numbered around 1500. Less than a year later, a new civil war would erupt in Ecuador, which would see the Esmeraldas Province rise up against the rule of Leónidas Plaza.
