= Francisco Robles =

President of Ecuador from 1856 to 1859

Francisco Robles García
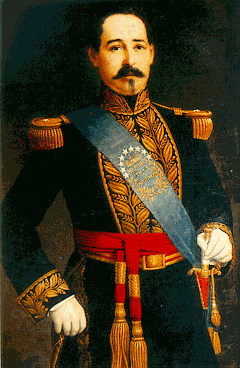
- Portrait of Francisco Robles

6th President of Ecuador
- In office 16 October 1856 – 31 August 1859
- Vice President: Marcos Espinel Endara; Jerónimo Carrión
- Preceded by: José María Urbina
- Succeeded by: Gabriel García Moreno

Personal details
- Born: Juan Francisco de Robles y García; 5 May 1811 Guayaquil, Spanish Empire
- Died: March 1893 Guayaquil, Ecuador
- Spouse: Carmen de Santistevan y Avilés
- Occupation: Military officer, politician, landowner

Francisco Robles García (Juan Francisco de Robles y García; 5 May 1811 – March 1893) was an Ecuadorian military officer and politician who served as the sixth President of Ecuador from 16 October 1856 to 31 August 1859. He was the first Ecuadorian president chosen in a relatively competitive constitutional election of the Marcist period and governed during one of the deepest crises of the nineteenth-century republic.

Robles’s administration expanded schools and backed liberal reforms associated with the post-1845 Marcist order, including the abolition of the Indigenous tribute inherited from the colonial era. His presidency is chiefly remembered, however, for the 1857 Ycaza–Pritchett contract, by which Ecuador attempted to settle part of its foreign “English debt” through land concessions in the Oriente and on the coast, provoking Peruvian protests and helping trigger the Peru–Ecuador crisis of 1858–1860.

Under pressure from Peru’s blockade and from domestic rivals, Robles moved the seat of government first to Riobamba and then to Guayaquil, but in 1859 Ecuador fragmented into competing regional governments in what Ecuadorian historiography often calls the Año Terrible (“Terrible Year”). Robles was overthrown, exiled to Chile and later Peru, and eventually returned to Guayaquil, where he died in March 1893.

== Early life and family background ==
Robles was born in Guayaquil on 5 May 1811, the son of the merchant and landowner Lupercio de Robles Pacheco and Manuela García y Coronel. He belonged to a prominent coastal family with commercial and rural interests in the Guayas basin. The expanded Guayaquil genealogy compiled by Pedro Robles y Chambers and later updated by Ezio Garay Arellano identifies him as “Juan Francisco Robles y García”, baptized in the Iglesia Matriz of Guayaquil, and places him within a wider network of Robles, Santistevan, Avilés, and related elite families of the city and its hinterland.

== Naval education and early military career ==
Robles studied at the Escuela Náutica de Guayaquil under the direction of the British-born Ecuadorian naval officer Juan Illingworth Hunt. During the Gran Colombia–Peru War, he took part as a young officer in the naval combat of Punta Malpelo on 31 August 1828, one of the formative actions in the naval history of the former Gran Colombia and Peru.

By the 1830s Robles had begun to distinguish himself in both military and political life. During the Marcist Revolution of 1845, which overthrew the dominance of former president Juan José Flores, he supported the anti-Florean movement from the river approaches to Guayaquil while commanding the war steamer Guayas. Under President José María Urbina, Robles rose rapidly: he served as governor of Guayas, commander general of Guayaquil, deputy for Manabí, and Minister of War before becoming the official candidate of the ruling liberal camp in the 1856 election.

== Presidency (1856–1859) ==
Robles assumed the presidency on 16 October 1856 as the political heir of Urbina and the Marcist liberals. His government sought administrative modernization and educational expansion. Contemporary and later Ecuadorian accounts credit his administration with the founding or reorganization of several schools and colleges, including educational institutions in Latacunga, Loja, Ambato, and Cuenca, and with issuing new regulations for primary education.

=== Abolition of the Indigenous tribute ===
One of the major liberal reforms associated with Robles’s presidency was the abolition of the Indigenous tribute, a colonial-era fiscal burden imposed on Indigenous communities. In practice the measure removed a longstanding and discriminatory tax, but it also weakened government revenues at a time when Ecuador’s treasury was already fragile. Historians have therefore treated the reform as both socially important and fiscally destabilizing in the context of the later crisis of his administration.

=== The Ycaza–Pritchett contract ===
Robles’s most consequential foreign-policy move was the attempt to reduce Ecuador’s old British debt by assigning public lands to creditors. On 21 September 1857 Ecuador signed the Ycaza–Pritchett contract—also spelled Icaza–Pritchett—through representatives Francisco Pablo Ycaza and George S. Pritchett. The agreement contemplated concessions in eastern territories and in parts of the coast, including areas in Esmeraldas, Los Ríos, and Guayas, as payment for the “English debt”.

Peru protested on the grounds that some of the lands offered lay in regions whose sovereignty remained disputed, especially in the Amazonian hinterland. The dispute sharpened Ecuador’s long-running boundary conflict with Peru and pushed the Robles government into an increasingly dangerous diplomatic confrontation.

== Peru–Ecuador crisis and the collapse of 1859 ==
Relations deteriorated further in 1858, when Peru, under President Ramón Castilla, escalated pressure on Ecuador after the two sides failed to resolve both the debt-land issue and their territorial disagreement. Peru authorized coercive action and imposed a naval blockade on Ecuador’s coast in late 1858, depriving the Ecuadorian state of access to Guayaquil customs revenues, its principal fiscal lifeline.

Facing the blockade and growing political opposition in Quito, Robles moved the capital from Quito to Riobamba on 4 November 1858 and then to Guayaquil on 12 January 1859 in order to direct the defense of the coast more effectively. The move deepened divisions between the coast and highlands and helped trigger rebellions against his authority.

In 1859 Ecuador entered the phase later remembered as the Año Terrible. Rival governments appeared in different regions: a provisional regime in Quito associated with Gabriel García Moreno, autonomous or semi-autonomous authorities in Cuenca and Loja, and later the Guayaquil regime of Guillermo Franco Herrera. Robles’s supporters under Urbina temporarily checked the Quito opposition at the Battle of Tumbuco in June 1859, forcing García Moreno to flee and seek aid in Peru, but the victory did not restore durable national unity.

As the blockade, civil war, and regional fragmentation worsened, Robles lost effective control of the republic. The crisis eventually opened the way for a new alignment between García Moreno and Juan José Flores and, after the defeat of Guillermo Franco in 1860, for the conservative reconstruction of the Ecuadorian state under García Moreno.

== Exile ==
After his overthrow in 1859, Robles was sent into exile in Chile and later settled in Peru. Like many Ecuadorian military and political leaders of the era, he remained involved in exile politics. Sources tied to the liberal tradition maintain that he continued to oppose the García Moreno regime from abroad and had links to later anti-government movements organized by Ecuadorian expatriates in Peru.

== Return to Ecuador and final years ==
Robles eventually returned to Ecuador. During the period of Ignacio de Veintemilla, he briefly re-entered public life and later served as collector of salt revenues in Babahoyo. In his final years he withdrew from active politics and devoted more attention to his estates and family affairs, especially those managed by his son Ignacio.

The exact date of his death remains disputed in accessible sources, but genealogical and biographical references agree that he died in Guayaquil in March 1893.

== Legacy ==
Robles is generally regarded as one of the last presidents of the Marcist period and as a transitional figure between the liberal coastal politics of the 1840s–1850s and the conservative reorganization of the 1860s. His government is remembered for educational reform and abolition of the Indigenous tribute, but above all for the debt-and-territory crisis that precipitated the Peru–Ecuador confrontation and the disintegration of central authority in 1859.

== Descendants ==
Robles married Carmen de Santistevan y Avilés in Guayaquil on 5 November 1835. The Guayaquil genealogical compilation of Pedro Robles y Chambers, in the revised edition directed by Ezio Garay Arellano, lists three children of that marriage and four additional children with Manuela Avilés, a Daule woman later recorded in the parish of La Soledad.

=== Children with Carmen de Santistevan ===
- Ignacio Robles y de Santistevan (17 January 1839 – 14 June 1915) – politician, diplomat, military officer, and businessman. He served as civil and military chief of Guayaquil in 1895, governor of Guayas, minister of foreign relations and finance, and consul of Mexico and Venezuela in Guayaquil. A commercial directory for 1901 places him in the leadership orbit of Banco del Ecuador, where Antonio Madinyá appeared as president of the bank’s directors, and a later Ecuadorian biographical compilation states that in 1905 Antonio Madinyá was president and Ignacio Robles vice-president of the bank. A Catalan migration study identifies this banker as Antoni Madinyà Vilasendra (1837–1920).
- Francisco Robles y de Santistevan – died young.
- Dolores Robles y de Santistevan (11 April 1841 – 4 February 1904) – married José Serafín Baquerizo Vera.

=== Children with Manuela Avilés ===
Robles y Chambers records that Robles also had children with Manuela Avilés, born in Daule circa 1833 and listed in the census of La Soledad in 1871.

- Luis Felipe Robles y Avilés' (born c. 1852) – resident of La Soledad, described as a liberal combatant, landowner, cattleman, and producer of the aguardiente brand El Roblecito.
- Fernando Robles y Avilés (born c. 1853) – resident of La Soledad; married Teresa Fajardo y Santistevan.
- Victoria Robles y Avilés (born c. 1856 – died 16 November 1906) – resident of La Soledad in the 1871 census.
- María E. Robles y Avilés (born c. 1859) – resident of La Soledad in the 1871 census.

== See also ==
- List of presidents of Ecuador
- Ecuadorian–Peruvian territorial dispute
- Gabriel García Moreno
- José María Urbina
