= March Revolution (Ecuador) =

March 1845 revolution in Ecuador

Ecuador's national flag adopted after the Marcist Revolution in 1845. This flag replaced the Colombian tricolor that had been adopted in 1830

The March Revolution (Revolución marcista or Revolución de Marzo) or Revolution of Forty-Five (Revolución de 1845) began on 6 March 1845, when the people of Guayaquil under the leadership of General António Elizalde and Lieutenant-Colonel Fernándo Ayarza revolted against the government of Juan José Flores. The people took the artillery barracks of Guayaquil along with other military and civilian supporters, including the guard on duty. Flores surrendered on his plantation, La Elvira, near Babahoyo and accepted a negotiation - which had terms including his leaving power and the declaration of all his decrees, laws, and acts as void and null, ending fifteen years of foreign domination in Ecuador. Flores received 20,000 pesos for his property and immediately left the country for Spain. The country was then governed by the triumvirate composed of José Joaquín de Olmedo, Vicente Ramón Roca and Diego Noboa.
