= Juan José Flores =

President of Ecuador (1830–1834, 1839–1845)

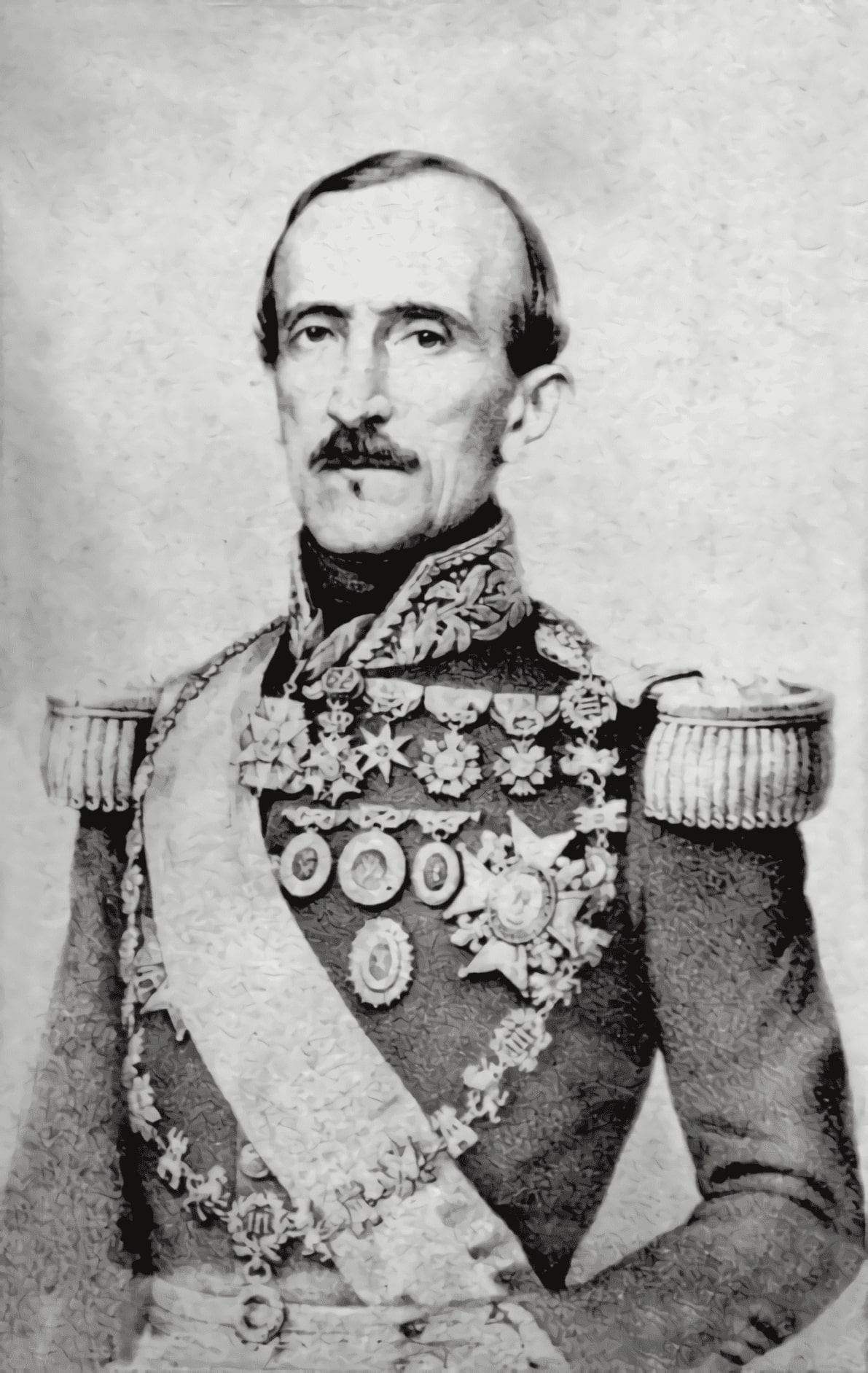
- Presidential Portrait of Juan José Flores

1st, 3rd & 4th President of Ecuador
- In office 1 April 1843 – 6 March 1845
- Preceded by: Francisco Aguirre Abad (as Acting Head of State)
- Succeeded by: José Joaquín de Olmedo (as Head of Provisional Government)
- In office 1 February 1839 – 15 January 1843
- Preceded by: Vicente Rocafuerte
- Succeeded by: Francisco Aguirre Abad (as Acting Head of State)
- In office 13 May 1830 – 10 September 1834
- Preceded by: Office created
- Succeeded by: Vicente Rocafuerte

Personal details
- Born: 19 July 1800 Puerto Cabello, Spanish Venezuela
- Died: 1 October 1864 (aged 64) Puná Island, Ecuador
- Party: Independent
- Other political affiliations: Club Nacional
- Spouse: Mercedes Jijón

Military service
- Battles/wars: Spanish American wars of independence; Venezuelan War of Independence; Colombian War of Independence; Pasto Campaign; Combat of Catambuco; Siege of Pasto; Combat of Mapachico; Battle of Sucumbíos; Gran Colombia–Peru War; Battle of Tarqui; Ecuadorian Civil War; Chihuahuan Revolution; Battle of Miñarica; Ecuadorian Civil War (1859-1860); Battle of Guayaquil; Colombian Civil War; War of the Supremes; Battle of Huilquipamba; Ecuadorian–Colombian War; Battle of Cuaspud (1863)

Juan José Flores y Aramburu (19 July 1800 – 1 October 1864) was a Venezuelan-born military general who became the first (in 1830), third (in 1839) and fourth (in 1843) President of the new Republic of Ecuador. He is often referred to as "The Founder of the Republic" or "Founder of Ecuador."

== Character ==
Juan José Flores' contemporaries described his physical appearance as a proud man in military uniform, slender and short but well proportioned, with a handsome countenance that radiates quick intelligence and a commanding presence. Juan José Flores appeared to be self-taught, and despite his scant rudimentary education, he became an eloquent orator and an avid reader of contemporary authors such as Rousseau, Montesquieu, Holbach, and Vattel. Juan José Flores was so fascinated with reading that in 1826 he asked for and received a shipment of books from General Santander, then vice-president of the Gran Colombia. Later in life, the professors of the University of Quito recognized Juan Jose Flores' efforts and bestowed an honorary doctorate on Flores in 1842.

== Early life ==
Juan José Flores Aramburu was born on 19 July 1800, in the city of Puerto Cabello, Venezuela, the illegitimate and only son of Juan José Aramburu, a rich and distinguished Spanish merchant from Spain, and to a Venezuelan, Rita Flores Bohorques. Eventually his father returned to Europe, abandoning his only son Juan José Flores and his mother to a life of extreme poverty. Because up to age 14 Juan José Flores received scant formal education, his impoverished mother placed him to learn and work in a Spanish military school and hospital. Since the poor yet sagacious Juan José Flores did not know what to do with his life at age 15, he enlisted as a private in the Spanish Royalist army of Spanish General Pablo Morillo, whose job it was to fight and destroy the patriot armies that were fighting for Spanish American independence in South America. During a short period of time Juan José Flores distinguished himself in the Spanish military for his loyalty, discipline, courage, heroism, and sagacity. However, as a sergeant, he was taken prisoner on 31 October 1817, and at this point he was convinced that freeing his homeland from Spain's domination was a just cause and joined the patriot army of Simón Bolívar. In the Patriot army he became loyal and acquainted with Simon Bolivar, who at an early stage recognized Juan José Flores' outstanding heroism and military talents especially at the victory at the Battle of Carabobo (1821), that at age 23 he was promoted to Colonel and then to Commandant General of the recently freed Royalist city of Pasto.

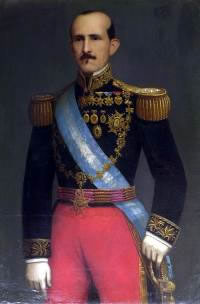
Portrait of Juan José Flores

== Political life ==
On 13 May 1830, the day of Ecuador's breaking away from Gran Colombia, Flores was named supreme chief of the new country, and then on 14 August 1830, he was named provisional president. His official term, however, did not start until 22 September 1830, 11 days after he was elected constitutional president by the assembly in Riobamba. That term lasted until 10 September 1834, and was marked with much turmoil. Flores faced a rebellion led by Luis Urdaneta, a loyalist of Simón Bolívar, who wanted to prevent Ecuador from leaving Gran Colombia. Flores also faced a threat from a member of the Ecuadorian congress, Vicente Rocafuerte, who attempted to overthrow him. Eventually, the two made an agreement – Rocafuerte would become president after Flores, and Flores would become leader of the military. Also during his term, he fought an invading Colombian army in 1832 and again starting in 1834, finally defeating them on 18 January 1835 in Miñarica, near Ambato. He was President of the Senate in 1837.

Flores' second term began on 1 February 1839, and ended 15 January 1843. The beginning of his term was marked by peace and social development—he kept his word to rule justly and to defend freedom. However, in the last year of his term, he intervened militarily in the politics of Nueva Granada at the request of the Colombian government, fighting his old enemy, José María Obando. When later forced to intervene again, he was attacked by the Colombian army and his popularity at home fell. Then, after irregularities in the elections of 1842, he pushed to have the 1835 constitution annulled, and the new constitution, nicknamed the "Carta de la esclavitud" ("charter of slavery") allowed him to continue in power for a third term, which began 1 April 1843. During this term, Flores fought to remain in power, but was ultimately overthrown on 6 March 1845 by a rebellion led by Rocafuerte and Vicente Ramón Roca, the man who became the next president of Ecuador.

After his presidency, Flores continued to play a role in Ecuadorian military and political life. He participated in the Ecuadorian–Colombian War and later became a symbol of emerging Ecuadorian nationalism, representing the country’s independence. Notably, he commanded Ecuadorian forces at the Battle of Cuaspud on 6 December 1863, where a defeat due to the terrain significantly weakened the army and thwarted his and García Moreno’s efforts to strengthen state centralization.

== Death ==
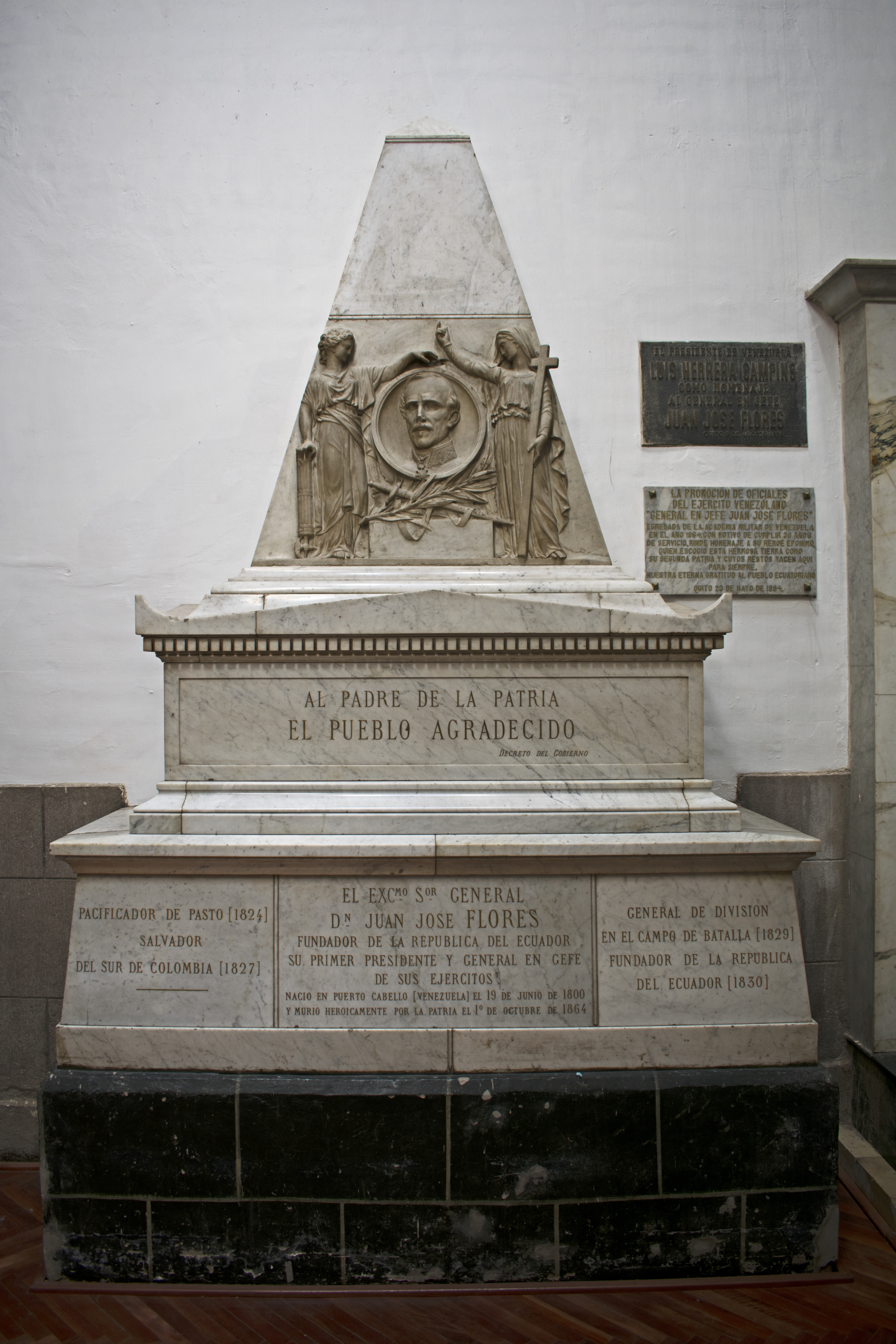
Tomb of Flores in Quito Metropolitan Cathedral

Flores died of uremia in 1864 while in campaign supporting the presidency of Gabriel García Moreno.

Flores left Quito to fight an expedition led by former President José María Urvina in the Gulf of Guayaquil. During the Battle of Santa Rosa, he received a stray shot in the lower abdomen and died on October 1 aboard the steamer Smirck, near Puná Island.

== Legacy ==
Floreana Island in the Galapagos Archipelago is named for Flores.

== See also ==
- List of presidents of Ecuador
- History of Ecuador (1830–1860)
- 1830 Constitution of Ecuador
- March Revolution (Ecuador)

Government offices
| Preceded by Position created | President of Ecuador; 1830–1834 | Succeeded by Vicente Rocafuerte |
| Preceded by Vicente Rocafuerte | President of Ecuador; 1839–1843 | Succeeded by Francisco Aguirre Abad (Acting head of state) |
| Preceded by Francisco Aguirre Abad (Acting head of state) | President of Ecuador; 1843–1845 | Succeeded by José Joaquín de Olmedo (Acting Head of Provisional Government) |
