= Gabriel García Moreno =

President of Ecuador

Servant of God Gabriel García Moreno
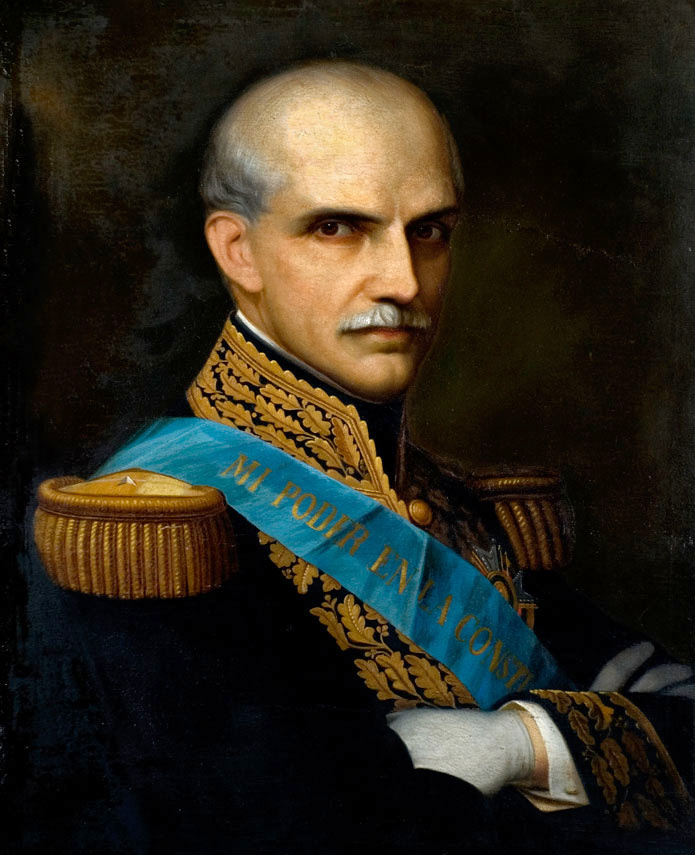

7th President of Ecuador
- In office 10 August 1869 – 6 August 1875
- Vice President: Francisco Javier León (1869–1875)
- Preceded by: Manuel de Ascásubi
- Succeeded by: Francisco Javier León
- In office 2 April 1861 – 30 August 1865
- Vice President: Mariano Cueva; Antonio Borrero; Rafael Carvajal
- Preceded by: Himself (as Interim President)
- Succeeded by: Rafael Carvajal

Interim President of Ecuador
- In office 19 January 1869 – 19 May 1869
- Preceded by: Juan Javier Espinosa
- Succeeded by: Manuel de Ascásubi
- In office 17 January 1861 – 2 April 1861
- Preceded by: Francisco Robles
- Succeeded by: Himself (as President)

Personal details
- Born: 24 December 1821 Guayaquil, Ecuador
- Died: 6 August 1875 (aged 53) Quito, Ecuador
- Party: Conservative Party
- Spouse(s): Rosa de Ascásubi; Mariana del Alcázar

Gabriel Gregorio Fernando José María García Moreno y Morán de Butrón (24 December 1821 – 6 August 1875), was an Ecuadorian politician and aristocrat who twice served as President of Ecuador (1861–65 and 1869–75) and was assassinated during his second term after being elected to a third.

He has been described as a dictator and caudillo. García Moreno was a conservative and centralist who supported state building and strong executive power. He was involved in the Battle of Cuaspud (6 December 1863) alongside General Juan José Flores, where an unexpected Ecuadoran defeat ended their project of military and political consolidation, drastically reducing Ecuador’s army and weakening their centralization efforts.

He is noted for his conservatism, nationalism, Catholic religious perspective and rivalry with liberal strongman Eloy Alfaro.

== Early life ==
Gabriel Garcia Moreno was born in 1821, the son of Gabriel García-Yangüas y Gómez de Tama, a Spanish nobleman, and María de las Mercedes Moreno y Morán de Butrón, a member of a wealthy aristocratic criollo family, descended from the first Conquerors and Spanish nobility arrived to South America, in Ecuador's main port, Guayaquil. Garcia y Gomez de Tama, his father, initially had invested in the shipping industry of the Viceroyalty of Peru (then a Spanish colony encompassing what is now Peru, Ecuador, and Bolivia) who moved to the New World in order to see his investment yield results. He died, however, when Garcia Moreno was a boy, leaving his upbringing to his devoutly Catholic Christian mother. He was tutored by a priest, Jose Betancourt.

This rearing instilled in the young Garcia Moreno a devout sense of Christian piety which would influence his later political activity as well as his private life. At the age of 15, Garcia Moreno began to study theology and law in the University of Quito. Thinking he had a vocation to the priesthood, he received minor orders and the tonsure; but his closest friends and his own interests convinced him to pursue a secular career. Graduating in 1844, he was admitted to the bar. Starting his career as both lawyer and journalist (opposed to the Liberal government in power) he made little headway. In 1849, he embarked on a two-year visit to Europe to see first hand the effects of the 1848 revolution.

He returned home to find his country in the grip of strident anti-clericals; he was elected a senator and joined the opposition. Although himself a monarchist (like the first President Juan José Flores) who tried to establish a "United Kingdom of the Andes" with the French Emperor's backing, he bowed to circumstances and allowed himself to be made president after a civil war the year after his return---so great had his stint as a senator made his reputation.

== President of Ecuador ==
In 1859, he was chosen by the conservative junta to be president, amid civil war.

=== First term (1861–1865) ===
In 1861, his presidential position was confirmed in a popular election for a four-year term. His successor was deposed by the Liberals in 1867. But two years later he was reelected, and then again in 1875. During his period in office, he propelled his nation forward, all the while uniting him more closely to Christianity.

His administration stabilized the government finances. His administration modernized the Ecuador military.

García Moreno came to the presidency of a country with an empty treasury and an enormous debt. To overcome this, he placed the government on stringent economy and abolished many positions, as well as cutting out the corruption which siphoned off tax money. As a result, he was able to provide Ecuadoreans with more for less. This improved the financial status of the country and attracted foreign investment.

These public works projects were accomplished in part through the use of revenues obtained from the trabajo subsidario tax, a tax initially created to aid the funding of local works projects. The trabajo subsidario tax in many ways mirrored the colonial mita labor requirements demanded of Indians by Spaniards. The voluntary contributions law and trabajo subsidario tax, revived in 1854, required that every citizen contribute four days of unpaid work to the State yearly or its monetary equivalent to promote the nation's public works projects. Like its mita precursor, the trabajo subsidario obligation fell most heavily on Ecuador's indigenous populations since these groups were unable to pay to avoid labor. Estate-bound peons were able to find protection from these laws through the help of hacendado or essential paternal landlords. In 1862, in a somewhat contentious move, García Moreno demanded control of these revenues of this tax in order to direct funds towards his ambitions for major infrastructural reform. This created a great deal of local discontent, as this meant diverting funds from more locally based public works projects. Using these funds, García Moreno began his famous highway system project, contracting workers from the trabajo subsidario requirement to build these roads.

Although the ultimate results of the project are often praised, García Moreno has been criticized for his use of forced labor to build these highways and the overall discriminatory and abusive treatment of indigenous workers during the process of construction. In his chronicle, Four years among the Ecuadorians, Friedrich Hassaurek describes witnessing the building of the road from Quito to Guayaquil. He describes the "lamentable sight" of Indians laboring to build the roads without sufficient tools. Hassurek writes, "[The Indian] does not work voluntarily, not even when paid for his labor, but is pressed into the service of the government for a length of time, at the expiration of which he is discharged and another forced into his place. He works unwillingly, is kept to his task by the whip of the overseer. It is evident that but little progress could be made under these circumstances." Along with a variety of notable public works programs, García Moreno reformed the universities, established two polytechnic and agricultural colleges and a military school, and increased the number of primary schools from 200 to 500. The number of primary students grew from 8000 to 32,000.

He resigned from office in 1865.

=== Second term (1869–1875) ===
He lived at the first Hacienda of Ecuador, the Hacienda Guachalá, leased from 1868 until near his death. García Moreno founded the Conservative Party in 1869.

His administration made education compulsory and free in 1871. The administration built new schools and hospitals, as well as expanded the road system in Ecuador.

Personally pious (he attended mass daily, as well as visiting the Blessed Sacrament; he received Holy Communion every Sunday—a rare practice before Pope Pius X—and was active in a sodality), he made it one of the first duties of his government to promote and support Christianity. Christianity was the official religion of Ecuador, but by the terms of a new Concordat, the State's power over appointment of bishops inherited from Spain was eliminated at García Moreno's insistence. The 1869 constitution made Christianity the religion of the State and required that both candidates and voters be Catholic Christian. He was the only ruler in the world to protest the Pope's loss of the Papal States, and two years later had the legislature consecrate Ecuador to the Sacred Heart of Jesus. One of his biographers writes that after this public consecration, he was marked for death by German freemasons.

García Moreno generated some animosity with his friendship toward the Society of Jesus (Jesuits). During a period of exile, he helped some displaced Jesuits from Germany find refuge in Ecuador. He had also advocated legislation that would outlaw secret societies.

García Moreno was assassinated while in office by Faustino Rayo, who attacked him using a machete. Other perpetrators deployed firearms in the fatal ambush. Rayo was a former captain who had served under García Moreno.

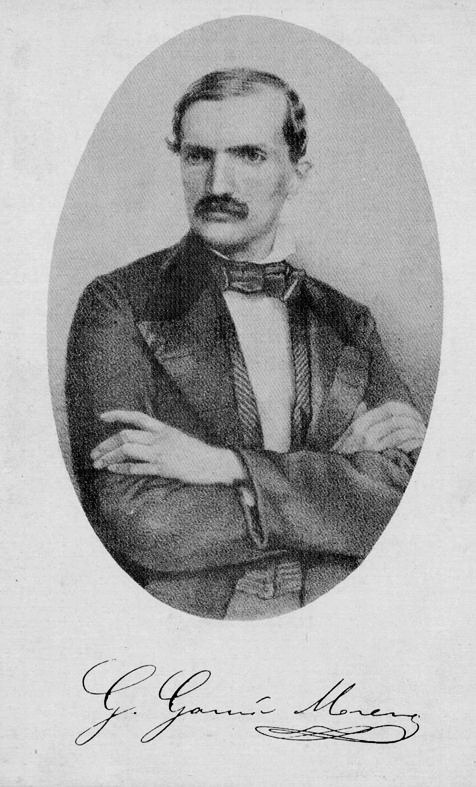
Portrait of Gabriel García Moreno

==== Political climate and assassination ====
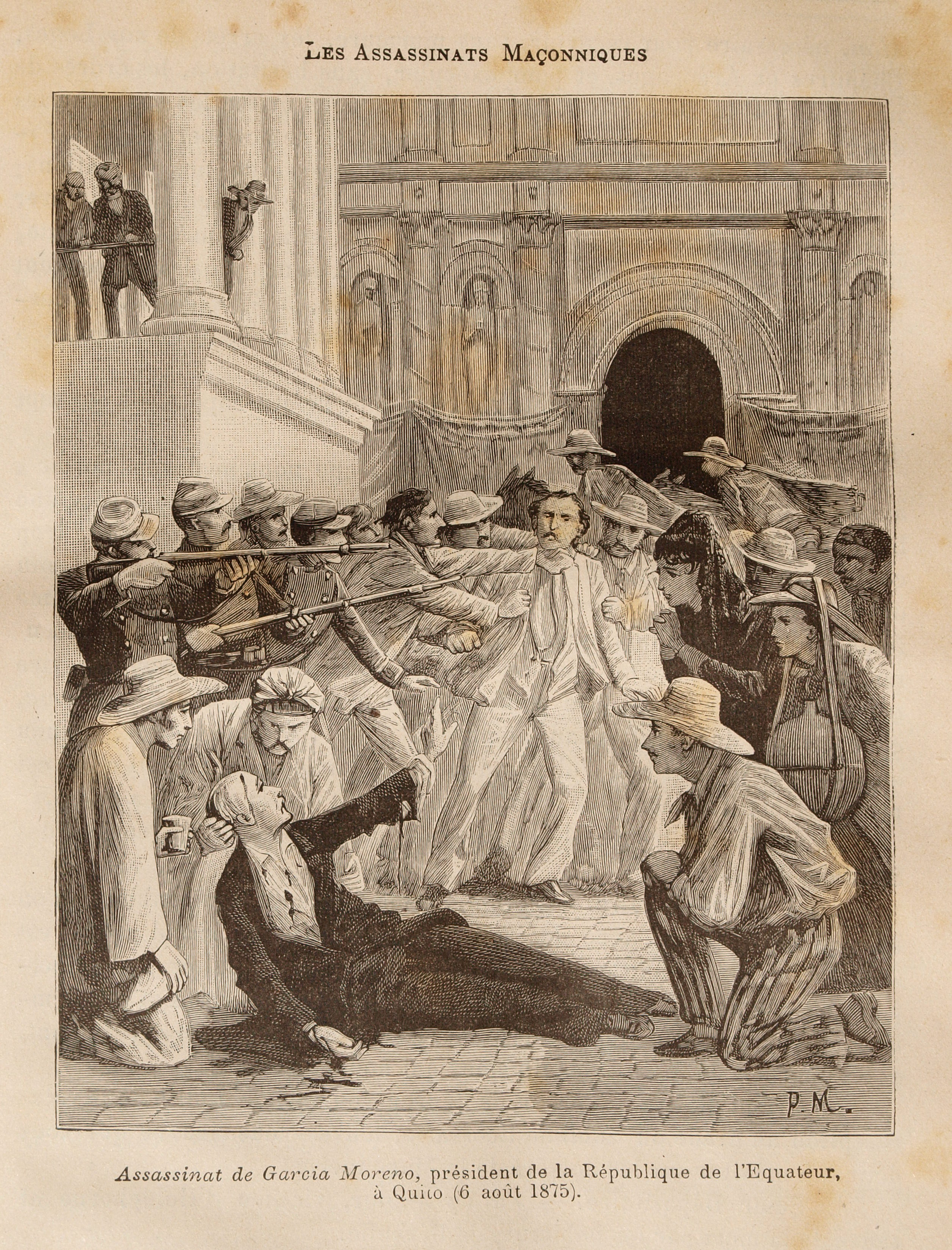
Assassination of Gabriel García Moreno, as seen by Pierre Méjanel

Liberals typically disapproved of García Moreno due to the authoritarian and ultraconservative nature of his rule and his utilization of secret police to silence leftist dissent. Some radicals viewed him as a dictator, and the liberals also were enraged that his policies remained after 1865 when his political allies were elected, and followed by his winning the presidency again in 1869. This opposition from the left compelled Juan Montalvo to write the pamphlet La dictadura perpetua (The Perpetual Dictatorship), which inspired the movement to assassinate Garcia Moreno. García Moreno, following his third election victory in 1875, wrote immediately to Pope Pius IX asking for his blessing before inauguration day on 30 August:

I wish to obtain your blessing before that day, so that I may have the strength and light which I need so much in order to be unto the end a faithful son of our Redeemer, and a loyal and obedient servant of His Infallible Vicar. Now that the Masonic Lodges of the neighboring countries, instigated by Germany, are vomiting against me all sorts of atrocious insults and horrible calumnies, now that the Lodges are secretly arranging for my assassination, I have more need than ever of the divine protection so that I may live and die in defense of our holy religion and the beloved republic which I am called once more to rule.

On 5 August, shortly before his assassination, a priest visited García Moreno and warned him, "You have been warned that your death was decreed by the Freemasons; but you have not been told when. I have just heard that the assassins are going to try and carry out their plot at once. For God's sake, take your measures accordingly!" García Moreno reportedly replied that he had already received similar warnings and after calm reflection concluded that the only measure he could take was to prepare himself to appear before God.

On 6 August 1875, García Moreno was assassinated on the steps of the National Palace in Quito, struck down with knives and revolvers, later re-tellings of the event by his admirers attributing to him the following last words: "¡Dios no muere!" ("God does not die!"). Faustino Rayo assaulted him with several blows of a machete, while three or four others fired their revolvers.

== Legacy ==
Pope Leo XIII wrote that García Moreno "fell under the steel of the wicked for the Church."

On 20 December 1939, the beatification process was begun for Garcia Moreno by Carlos María de la Torre, Archbishop of Quito, after previous examinations of the question of García Moreno's martyrdom. In 1958, a prayer for the canonization of García Moreno was issued as an indulgence. However, García Moreno's process stalled soon after the Second Vatican Council. In 1974, Cardinal Pablo Vega replied to Hamish Fraser about the state of García Moreno's process, telling him that, "Unfortunately, there is neither the religious nor political environment."

== Works ==
=== Gabriela Garcia Moreno - own works ===
- Escritos y Discursos de Gabriel García Moreno (2 volumes), 1887–1888, Sociedad de la Juventud Católica de Quito,
- Cartas de Gabriel García Moreno (4 volumes), 1953–1955, Wilfrido Loor Moreira,

=== Non-fiction ===
- El mártir del Ecuador, 1875, Víctor Rosselló
- Colección de algunos escritos relativos a la memoria del excelentísimo Señor Doctor D. Gabriel García Moreno, 1876, Eloy Proaño y Vega
- García Moreno Président de L'Équateur Vengeur et Martyr du Droit Chrétien, 1887, Augusto Berthe,
- Vida del Excmo. señor D. Gabriel García Moreno, restaurador y mártir de la tesis católica en el Ecuador, 1889, Ángel Zarzuelo de Cancio
- Apuntes biograficos del gran magistrado ecuatoriano Gabriel Garcia Moreno, 1892 Pablo Herrera
- Garcia Moreno, président de la République de l'Equateur, 1893, Désiré Leroux
- Vie illustrée de Garcia Moreno, 1898, Charles d' Hallencourt
- García Moreno, 1904, Juan León Mera,
- Gabriel García Moreno: regenerator of Ecuador, 1914, Mary Monica Maxwell-Scott,
- Un gran americano García Moreno, 1921, José Legohuir Raud,
- Gabriel García Moreno y El Ecuador de su Tiempo, 1941, Richard Pattee,
- García Moreno's Dream of a European Protectorate, 1942, William Spence Robertson,
- Vida de Don Gabriel García Moreno, 1942, Manuel Gálvez,
- Orígenes del Ecuador de Hoy, García Moreno, 1948, Luis Robalino Dávila,
- Vida de García Moreno (13 volumes), 1954–1981, Severo Gomezjurado,
- En defensa de la verdad: entrevista al hijo de Faustino Lemos Rayo, 1958, César Pérez Moscoso
- García Moreno, el Santo del patíbulo, 1959, Benjamín Carrión,
- El campeón de los errores: refutación al libro de Benjamín Carrión, 1960, César Pérez Moscoso
- García Moreno y sus asesinos, 1966, Wilfrido Loor Moreira,
- Por un García Moreno de cuerpo entero, 1978, Gabriel Cevallos García,
- García Moreno, 1984, Manuel M. Freire Heredia,
- Encuentro con la historia, García Moreno, líder católico de Latinoamérica, 2005, Francisco Salazar Alvarado,
- Gabriel García Moreno and Conservative State Formation in the Andes, 2008, Peter Henderson,
- "Dios no muere!" the life of Gabriel García Moreno, 2009, Maxwell-Scott,
- García Moreno, 2014, Hernán Rodríguez Castelo,
- García Moreno su proyecto político y su muerte, 2016, Enrique Ayala Mora,

=== Poems ===
- El héroe mártir, canto a la memoria de García Moreno, 1876, Juan León Mera,
- Año jubilar del primer centenario del nacimiento del excelentísimo señor doctor Gabriel García Moreno (colección literaria), 1921,

=== Novels ===
- Sé que vienen a matarme, 2001, Alicia Yánez Cossío,
- Expiación, 2012, Juan Ortiz García

=== Filmography ===
- Sé que vienen a matarme, 2007, Film director - Carl West, Gabriel García Moreno - Jaime Bonelli

== See also ==
- President of Ecuador
- List of presidents of Ecuador
- History of Ecuador
- Conservative Party (Ecuador)
- Miguel Febres Cordero

Political offices
Preceded by Francisco Robles	President of Ecuador; 1859-1865	Succeeded by Rafael Carvajal
Preceded by Juan Javier Espinosa	President of Ecuador; 1869	Succeeded by Manuel de Ascásubi
Preceded by Manuel de Ascásubi	President of Ecuador; 1869-1875	Succeeded by Francisco León Franco
