= List of ambassadors of Ecuador to Chile =

Coordinates: 33.420063°S 70.610401°W

Ambassador of Ecuador to Chile
- Inaugural holder: Marcos Espinel
- Formation: June 9, 1852

The Ecuadorian ambassador in Santiago de Chile is the official representative of the Government in Quito to the government of Chile.

== List of representatives ==
Diplomatic agrément/Diplomatic accreditation	Ambassador	Observations	President of Ecuador	List of presidents of Chile	Term end
June 9, 1852	Marcos Espinel	Chargé d'affaires el Gobierno ecuatoriano acreditó en calidad de Encargado de Negocios en Santiago, al doctor Marcos Espinel, funcionario que llevó como misión esencial, la de negociar con el Gobierno chileno un pacto que protegiera por	José María Urbina	Manuel Montt Torres	
1856	Francisco J. Aguirre		Francisco Robles	Manuel Montt Torres	
1860	Vicente Piedrahita	Chargé d'affaires	Gabriel García Moreno	Manuel Montt Torres	
1866	Gabriel García Moreno		Jerónimo Carrión	José Joaquín Pérez Mascayano	
1883	Carlos R. Tobar	Chargé d'affaires	Luis Cordero Crespo	Domingo Santa María González	
1885	Francisco Javier Salazar Arboleda		Luis Cordero Crespo	Domingo Santa María González	
1894	Carlos R. Tobar		Luis Cordero Crespo	Jorge Montt Álvarez	
1902	Alejandro Cárdenas Proaño		Leonidas Plaza Gutiérrez	Aníbal Zañartu	
1902	Rafael H. Elizalde		Leonidas Plaza Gutiérrez	Aníbal Zañartu	
1916	Delfín Treviño		Alfredo Baquerizo Moreno	Juan Luis Sanfuentes Andonaegui	
1917	Augusto Aguirre Aparicio		Alfredo Baquerizo Moreno	Juan Luis Sanfuentes Andonaegui	
1919	José Rafael Bustamante	Chargé d'affaires	Alfredo Baquerizo Moreno	Juan Luis Sanfuentes Andonaegui	
1919	José Rafael Bustamante	Chargé d'affaires	Alfredo Baquerizo Moreno	Juan Luis Sanfuentes Andonaegui	
1920	Cesáreo Carrera		José Luis Tamayo	Arturo Alessandri Palma	
1923	José Rafael Bustamante		José Luis Tamayo	Arturo Alessandri Palma	
1927	Carlos Manuel Larrea		Isidro Ayora	Carlos Ibáñez del Campo	
1932	Manuel Sotomayor y Luna		Alberto Guerrero Martínez	Carlos Dávila	
1933	Miguel A. De Icaza		Abelardo Montalvo	Carlos Dávila	
1934	Modesto Larrea Jijón		José María Velasco Ibarra	Carlos Dávila	
1936	Vicente Santistevan Elizalde		Federico Páez	Carlos Dávila	
1940	Gustavo Darquea Terrán	Chargé d'affaires	Andrés Córdova	Pedro Aguirre Cerda	
1941	Gonzalo Escudero Moscoso	Minister Plenipotentiary	Carlos Alberto Arroyo del Río	Jerónimo Méndez	
1942	Homero Viteri Lafonte	Ambassador	Carlos Alberto Arroyo del Río	Juan Antonio Ríos Morales	
1944	Eduardo Samaniego y Alvarez		José María Velasco Ibarra	Juan Antonio Ríos Morales	
1945	Arturo Borrego Bustamante		José María Velasco Ibarra	Juan Antonio Ríos Morales	
1946	Carlos Guevara Moreno		José María Velasco Ibarra	Alfredo Duhalde	
1948	Benjamín Carrión	Manuel Benjamín Carrión	Galo Plaza Lasso	Alfredo Duhalde	
1949	José Gabriel Navarro		Galo Plaza Lasso	Alfredo Duhalde	
1951	Gonzalo Zaldumbide		Galo Plaza Lasso	Alfredo Duhalde	
1953	Rafael Arízaga Vega		José María Velasco Ibarra	Carlos Ibáñez del Campo	
1953	Alberto Puig Arosemena		José María Velasco Ibarra	Carlos Ibáñez del Campo	
1956	Angel Isaac Chiriboga		Camilo Ponce Enríquez	Carlos Ibáñez del Campo	
1957	Fidel López Arteta		Camilo Ponce Enríquez	Carlos Ibáñez del Campo	
1961	Arturo Borrero Bustamante		Carlos Julio Arosemena Monroy	Jorge Alessandri Rodríguez	
1964	José Ricardo Martínez Cobos		Ramón Castro Jijón	Eduardo Frei Montalva	
1966	Teodoro Bustamante		Clemente Yerovi Indaburú	Eduardo Frei Montalva	
1971	Eugenio Correa Escobar		José María Velasco Ibarra	Salvador Allende	
1974	Luis Ponce Enríquez		Guillermo Rodríguez Lara	Augusto Pinochet	
1977	Luis Cabrera Sevilla		Alfredo Poveda Burbano	Augusto Pinochet	
1979	Gustavo Cordovéz Pareja		Jaime Roldós	Augusto Pinochet	
1983	César Valdivieso Chiriboga		Osvaldo Hurtado	Augusto Pinochet	
1988	Lucindo Almeyda Teran		Rodrigo Borja	Augusto Pinochet	
1989	Washington Herrera Pana		Rodrigo Borja	Augusto Pinochet	
1992	Rodrigo Valdez Baquero		Sixto Durán Ballén	Patricio Aylwin	
1995	Leonardo Carrión Eguiguren		Sixto Durán Ballén	Eduardo Frei Ruiz-Tagle	
1997	Jaime Marchan Romero		Fabián Alarcón	Eduardo Frei Ruiz-Tagle	
2001	Gonzalo Salvador Olguín		Gustavo Noboa	Ricardo Lagos	
2007	José Sandoval	Chargé d'affaires	Rafael Correa	Michelle Bachelet	2007
2007	Francisco José Borja Cevallos		Rafael Correa	Michelle Bachelet	2008
August 30, 2017	Homero Arellano Lascano		Lenín Moreno	Michelle Bachelet	2021
