= July Revolution (Ecuador) =

Civic-military movement in Ecuador

Date	July 9, 1925
Location	Ecuador
Action	Arrests
Result	Military junta, technocracy

Government-Insurgents
La Argolla plutocracy	League of Young Officers

Commanders and leaders
Gonzalo Córdova; Francisco Urbina Jado	Ildefonso Mendoza Vera; Juan Ignacio Pareja; Luis Telmo Paz y Miño; Carlos Guerrero

Political support
	Ecuadorian Radical Liberal Party

The July Revolution (Revolución Juliana) was a civic-military movement in Ecuador that led to a coup on July 9, 1925. Spearheaded by the Military League, a group of young, progressive officers in the Ecuadorian Army, the coup resulted in the overthrow of President Gonzalo Córdova.

After an initial military junta, it was extended for six years until 1931, with two provisional government juntas and the presidency of Isidro Ayora, first interim and then constitutional, which ended with a new military coup on August 24, 1931.

The revolution was oriented against the coastal liberal oligarchy, which the military leaders viewed as corrupt and unable to address the socioeconomic problems facing modern Ecuador. Once in power, they introduced labor policies including the introduction of a minimum wage, an eight-hour workday, and a state pension fund, as well as other social reforms.

== Background ==
In the years after 1918, the post-war depression reduced demand from the United States and Europe, with the consequent drop in exports. By 1924, the favorable situation had changed, and Brazilian production (11.2%) relegated Ecuador to second place (6.6%).

The July coup was against the liberal State established since the Revolution of 1895. Social disenchantment with the hegemony of oligarchic liberalism began to manifest clearly during the 1910s. The end of radical liberalism and the assassination of former president Eloy Alfaro (1912) and his main lieutenants had given way to General Leónidas Plaza and the succession of the governments of Alfredo Baquerizo Moreno, José Luis Tamayo and Gonzalo Córdova. Under his mandates, the cocoa economy and a monetary and financial regime continued to prosper —beginning with the first gold standard (1900–17), the suspension of convertibility (1914) and the inorganic over-issuance of banknotes— through which he enthroned his hegemony the “bankocracy”. Policies of a "plutocratic liberalism" that had consolidated the banking predominance of Guayaquil, while marginalizing the interests of the incipient working class.

Perpetuated in power according to the fraudulent electoral system of the time, despite trying, neither the organic political-military forces nor the social movements had managed to change the course of the liberal regime. The 1913 uprising led by Carlos Concha, later devolved into war, failed in its attempt to revive radicalism; as he would do years later, on September 6, 1924, led by Jacinto Jijón y Caamaño, who called on the conservatives to take up arms. For their part, the socialist organizations were just taking shape — the party would appear, precisely, during the Revolution — and the labor movement, although it showed signs of its vigor in a first general strike in November 1922, its actions ended up being repressed without regard, like that month in Guayaquil or against the indigenous people of the Leyto hacienda, on September 1923.

Likewise, the hypothetical support of the Army was at least improbable. The high command and large military, involved and due to the policy of the regime, were in charge of maintaining and guaranteeing order. Not surprisingly, the July movement would do without them; it would be carried out precisely by young officers to whom, among other things, promotions and career opportunities were closed.

== Coup ==
On the afternoon of July 9, 1925, in Guayaquil, a group of young officers under the command of Major Ildefonso Mendoza Vera arrested the government authorities, Francisco Urbina Jado, owner of the Banco Comercial y Agrícola de Guayaquil, other representatives of the bank and the military commanders themselves. On the 10th, they formed a Supreme Military Junta that occupied the Government for six hours. It was made up of each one of the representatives of the Army units, about twelve members: Major Juan Ignacio Pareja, as president; Lieutenant Colonel Luis Telmo Paz y Miño; Major Carlos A. Guerrero; the four captains Emilio Valdivieso, César Plaza, Enrique Rivadeneira and Julio Enrique Pareja; the three lieutenants Francisco Gallegos T., Virgilio Molina and Federico Struve (secretary); and the two second lieutenants Ángel Bonilla G. and Luis A. Sierra. In turn, they had agreed to name a Provisional Military Junta, with only six of the officers: as president, Luis Telmo Paz y Miño; as members, Carlos A. Guerrero, Juan I. Pareja, Emilio Valdivieso and Ángel Bonilla; and would keep Federico Struve as secretary.

A few hours later, in Quito, Major Carlos Guerrero, accompanied by eight officers and fifty soldiers from the Pichincha Battalion, deposed President Gonzalo S. Córdova. Once again, the military appointed a provisional Governing Board. In his view, Ecuador would be governed by a collegiate and provisional Executive of seven members — four for the Sierra and three for the Coast — with broad powers to reorganize the country, whose sessions would be presided over by a director, a rotating position on a weekly basis and without additional functions, except that of coordinating the plenary sessions of the Board. This form of government would be maintained in the two provisional boards.

== Provisional government ==
The first provisional Governing Board governed between July 10, 1925 and January 9, 1926. It was made up of seven members, five civilians and two soldiers, who would be in charge of the different ministries: Francisco Arízaga Luque, Francisco Boloña, José Rafael Bustamante, Luis Napoleón Dillon and Pedro Pablo Garaicoa, and the generals Francisco Gómez de la Torre and Moisés Oliva (later replaced by Modesto Larrea Jijón). In his proclamation "To the Nation", signed in Quito on July 17, he thus specified his "idealistic and disinterested" program:

"[...] will be inspired by a truly democratic spirit and will tend to respect the rights and freedoms of all citizens."
