= July Revolution (disambiguation) =

July Revolution refers to the overthrow of the Bourbons in 1830 by the July Monarchy in France.

July Revolution may also refer to:

- July Revolution (Ecuador), 1925 civic-military movement in Ecuador
- July Uprising, 2024 mass uprising in Bangladesh
- 14 July Revolution, Iraqi military coup in 1958
- 17 July Revolution, 1968 Ba'athist coup in Iraq
