= Cristobal Pazmino =

Ecuadorian guitarist and composer

Cristobal Pazmino is an Ecuadorian guitarist and composer, recognized as one of the top guitarists in his country.

== Early life ==
Pazmino was born in Riobamba, Ecuador, in 1957. His brother taught him to play guitar by ear. Both brothers were recognized for their musical talent. They often performed in their school and as part of a musical group. He learned electric guitar, bass guitar, ‘night guitar’ (known elsewhere as the classical guitar) all without sight reading. In 1976 he moved in Paris where he decided to study classical guitar in earnest, first at the Schola Cantorum in Paris for 3 years, then at the Conservatoire National de Musique de St Maur de Fossés, Val de Marne (CNRM) for 5 years where he was awarded the Gold medal (Médaille d’Or) in 1986.

== Career ==
During his time in France, his guitar was how we stayed connected with his homeland. His music first aired in 1976 in France and later across the globe. He has performed in 32 countries and plays mainly Ecuadorian and Latin American music. Pazmino is the inspiration, founder, and artistic director of the International Festival of Guitar in Vendôme, one of the highlights of the French guitar music calendar.

As a classical guitarist, he devoted himself solely to Latin-American music, and Ecuadorian music in particular, combining popular music with the techniques of classical guitar. In France his recordings have been featured in various TV and film productions: for TV channel F3, the short film The Golden Earth of the Incas. In 1989 his music appeared in documentary film Panama, Prince of Hats for the Arte Channel in 1997, cable channels in 2002 for documentaries on Chile, and in Ecuador Teleamazonas broadcast his theme tune for a season for the series At home with the family.

He served as VENDÔME brand ambassador. He is a corporate member of SACEM France.

== Credits ==
- I Festival International de Guitare d' Alsace [1992]
- IV Festival International, Stockholm, Sweden [1992]
- VI Festival International, Fribourg, Switzerland [1992]
- III Festival Internacionalional, San José, Costa Rica [1993]
- Guitarras del Mundo 95 : Rio Cuarto et Buenos Aires, Argentina [1995]
- Palais del IILA à Rome Italie 1996
- Latin-Américan Guitar Masters-Universite Internationale de Miami, Florida USA [1997]
- Bolivar Hall Festival, Londres Angleterre [1998].
- V festival Guitarras del Mundo [1999],
- I y V Festival Internacional de guitarra - Vendôme [1997 ]y [2001]
- II Festival International de Cagliari, Italy [2001]
- VII Festival Guitarras del Mundo [2001 ] [2003]
- Festival de Santisteban del Puerto - Jaén, Spain [2004]
- Festival Regino Saenz de la Maza, Burgos, Spain [2005]
- Festival de la ciudad de MONTS, France [2005]
- Guitarras del Mundo- Argentina [2006] en duo avec Floriane Charles.
- 15° Festival de la ville d'ANTONY (92) France, 1° April [2007]
- 11° Festival International de Vendôme France, 8 April [2007]
- Festillesime41 junio [2007], 3 concerts en Loir et Cher
- 10° festival de guitarra de Taxco, July [2007]
- 10° Semana Internacional de la Guitarra en Burgos, Spain. Augus [2007]

== Edited scores ==
- 2015 : « Sol de Madrugada » 14 œuvres originales, paru chez Editions VAN DE VELDE Paris. (Catalogue Henri Lemoine, Paris)
- 2002 : « Riobambeñita » Compositions et arrangements pour guitare, paru chez EML Bruxelles.
- 1999 : « 5 Pieza ecuatorianas » paru chez EML Bruxelles

== Film ==
- Je tenais à vous dire, Réalisé par Pierre Mobèche, Valoris' Action. Vendôme [2021]

== Soundtracks ==
- [1999] En Familia Téléamazonas Quito - Équateur
- [1997] Panama Prince des chapeaux film documentaire, (la5) ARTE
- [1989] « La Terre et l’or des Incas » France3

== Discography ==
- Bestiario andino 2017
- Ternura 2010
- Guitarra de Alas 2007
- Quito de mis Ensueños 2005
- Riobambeñita 2000
- Guitarras del Mundo 1995
- 5 siècles de guitare (Festival d'Alsace) Vol1. et Vol2. 1992
- Pasillo Inmortal 1991
- Melodias de America del Sur 1988
