= Benjamín Carrión Palace =

Coordinates: 0°12′36″S 78°29′47″W

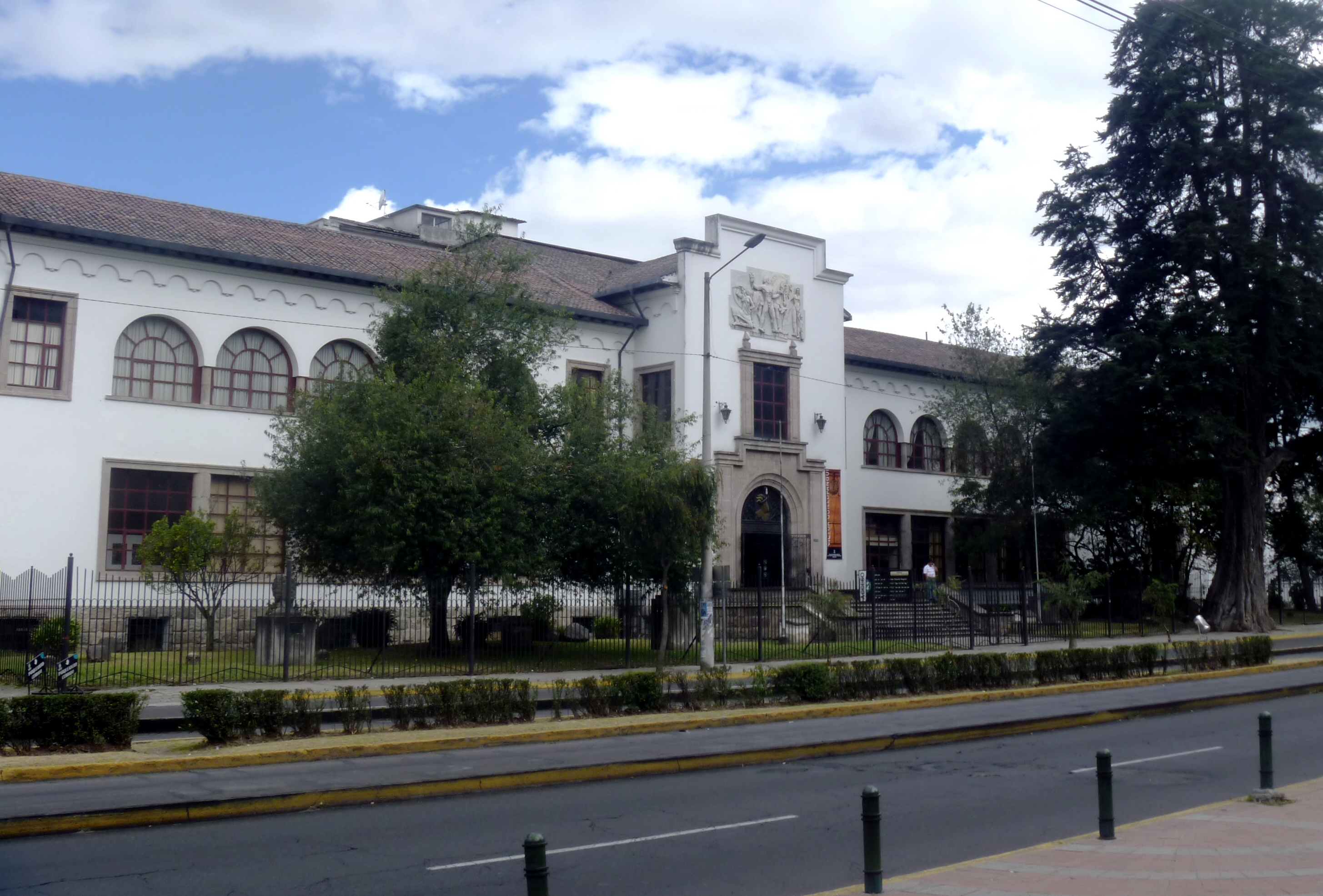
Benjamín Carrión Palace

Benjamín Carrión Palace (Spanish: Palacio Benjamín Carrión) is a palace and museum in Quito, Ecuador. Named after Benjamín Carrión, a diplomat, cultural promoter, and an Ecuadorian writer. The palace was built in 1946–8. The building is located in the district of Itchimbía, near the border with La Mariscal. Its south side is adjacent to El Arbolito and was one of the first structures completed in the complex of buildings which create the Cultural Center of Ecuador.
