= Luis Larrea Alba =

Ecuadorian politician (1894–1979)

Acting President of Ecuador
- In office 24 August 1931 – 15 October 1931
- Preceded by: Isidro Ayora
- Succeeded by: Alfredo Baquerizo

Personal details
- Born: 25 October 1894 Guayaquil, Ecuador
- Died: 17 April 1979 (aged 84) Córdoba, Argentina
- Party: Radical Liberal

Luis Alberto Larrea Alba (25 October 1894, Guayaquil, Ecuador – 17 April 1979, Córdoba, Argentina) was a military officer and acting President of Ecuador in from 24 August to 15 October 1931.

Political offices
| Preceded by Isidro Ayora | President of Ecuador; 1931 | Succeeded by Alfredo Baquerizo |
