= Pazmiño =

The Pazmiño family
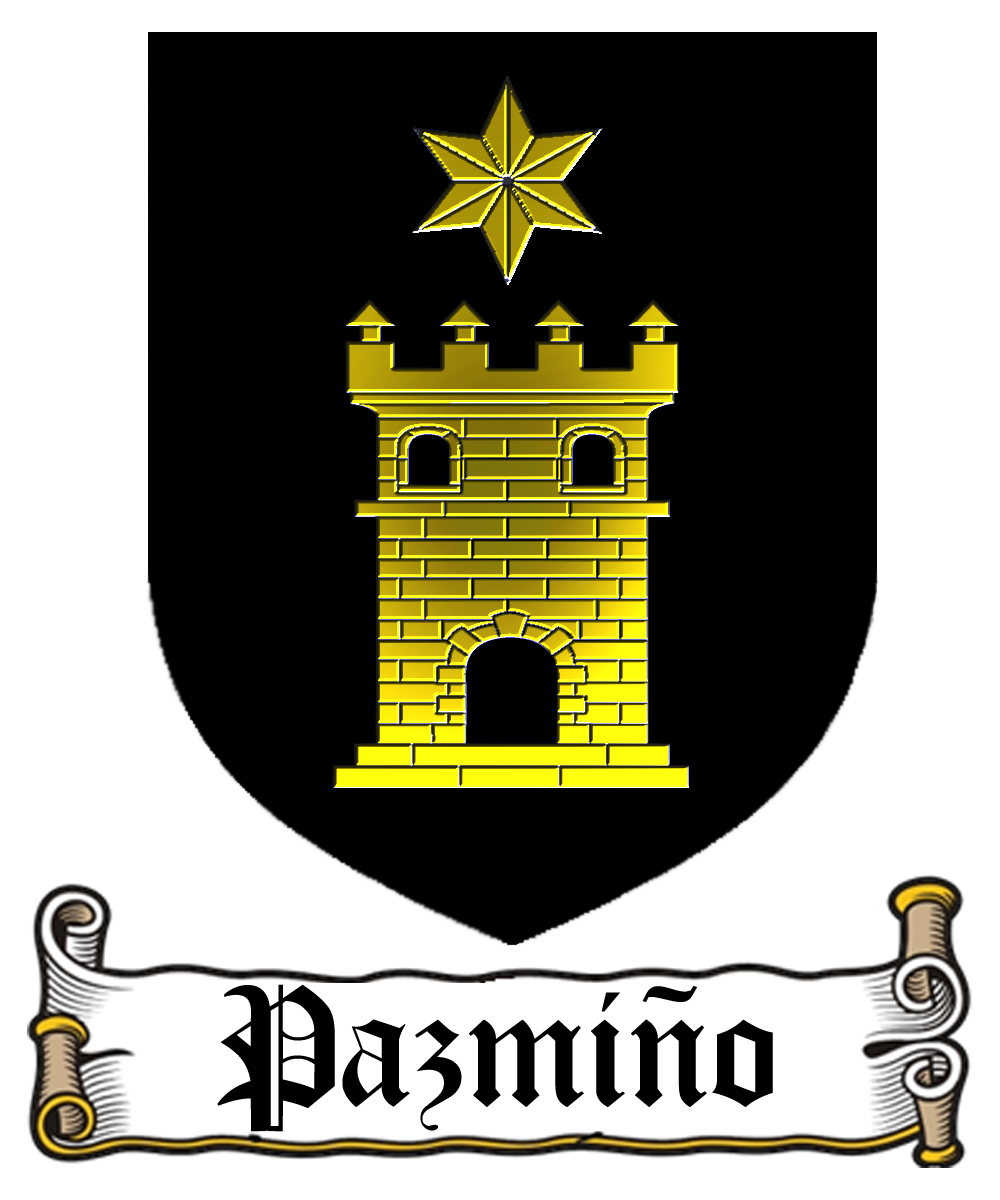
- In a field of sable, a golden tower, surmounted by a golden star.
- Current region: Overwhelmingly Ecuador. Much lesser extent Colombia, Venezuela, Chile, Spain, United States and others.
- Earlier spellings: Paz Miño, de Paz Miño, de Pazmiño, de Paz y Miño, Pazimyño.
- Etymology: Peace [and] Cinnabar-Red.
- Origin: Quito, Ecuador.
- Connected families: Paz y Miño, Pasmiño, Pazminio, Pazimiño, Paziminio, Pasiminio, Pasminio, Pasimiño, Pazymiño, Pazmino, Paz y Mino, Paz-y-Mino, Pasmino, Pazimino, Pasimino, Pazymino.
- Distinctions: Extremaduran hidalgo (nobility).
- [1] Originally a Sephardi Jewish family from Llerena, Spain that converted to Catholicism in the 15th century, relocating to colonial Ecuador, and assimilating as members of the Hispanic population

Pazmiño (Spanish: [pasˈmiɲo] or [paθˈmiɲo]) is a Spanish language surname of Sephardi judaeo-converso origin, and originating in its present-day form in what is today Ecuador, formerly the Royal Audience of Quito.

The surname is carried by the descendants of members of a family of Sephardi Jews from Llerena, Spain that converted to Catholicism in the late 15th century, at the dawn of the Spanish Inquisition. Sephardi Jewish converts to Catholicism have throughout time been variously termed anusim, conversos and marranos, each with differing connotations, the latter being pejorative.

In the early 16th century, during the first decades of Spanish colonization of South America, the family relocated to colonial Ecuador, along with other Sephardi Jewish converts to Catholicism whose real ethnicity was obscured and hidden from the colonial authorities.

In the last couple of centuries, persons of this lineage have since migrated out of Ecuador into neighboring countries, particularly Colombia, but also Peru. Some have ventured further afield around Latin America, including Chile and Panama. Others yet have more recently migrated to the United States and Australia.

Over the last decade, however, the greatest number have crossed the Atlantic Ocean to Spain in what could be described as a reverse migration of descendants of anusim, some five centuries after their forebears first established themselves in the New World. To this day, the bulk of persons of this lineage—whether Pazmiño or those carrying variants of the surname—are found mainly in Ecuador, and traditionally in the Sierra region of the country.

== History ==
=== Spain ===
Llerena, Spain
- Location of Llerena within Spain
- Coordinates: 38°14′21″N 6°01′07″W

Sancho de Paz, a native of Llerena born around 1445, was a Jewish merchant of good standing and economic means that converted to Catholicism, turning himself and his family into conversos. Llerena, located in Extremadura in southwestern Spain, at the buffer zone with Portugal, became the seat of the most virulent court of the Tribunal of the Holy Office of the Inquisition.

Llerena and surrounding areas in Extremadura served as areas of refuge for those Jews who fled the pogroms of 1391, and later served as a refuge for the Jews of Córdoba, Seville and Cádiz. In 1485, the permanent tribunal of the Inquisition was set up in Llerena. In that same year, Sancho de Paz was habilitated by the Inquisition.

Sancho de Paz's sons, Pedro de Paz Miño (also found as Pedro de Miño y Paz, Pedro de Miño de Paz), born around 1475, and Cristóbal, born around 1485, are the ancestral trunk and founders of the Pazmiño clan. They migrated to the Royal Audience of Quito, where they, along with their children (among them, Sancho, Rodrigo, Cristóbal) and their numerous grandchildren (among them Diego, Hernando, Cristóbal, Pedro, Ana, and Isabel) served in the capacity of both conquistadors and settlers.

=== Royal Audience of Quito ===
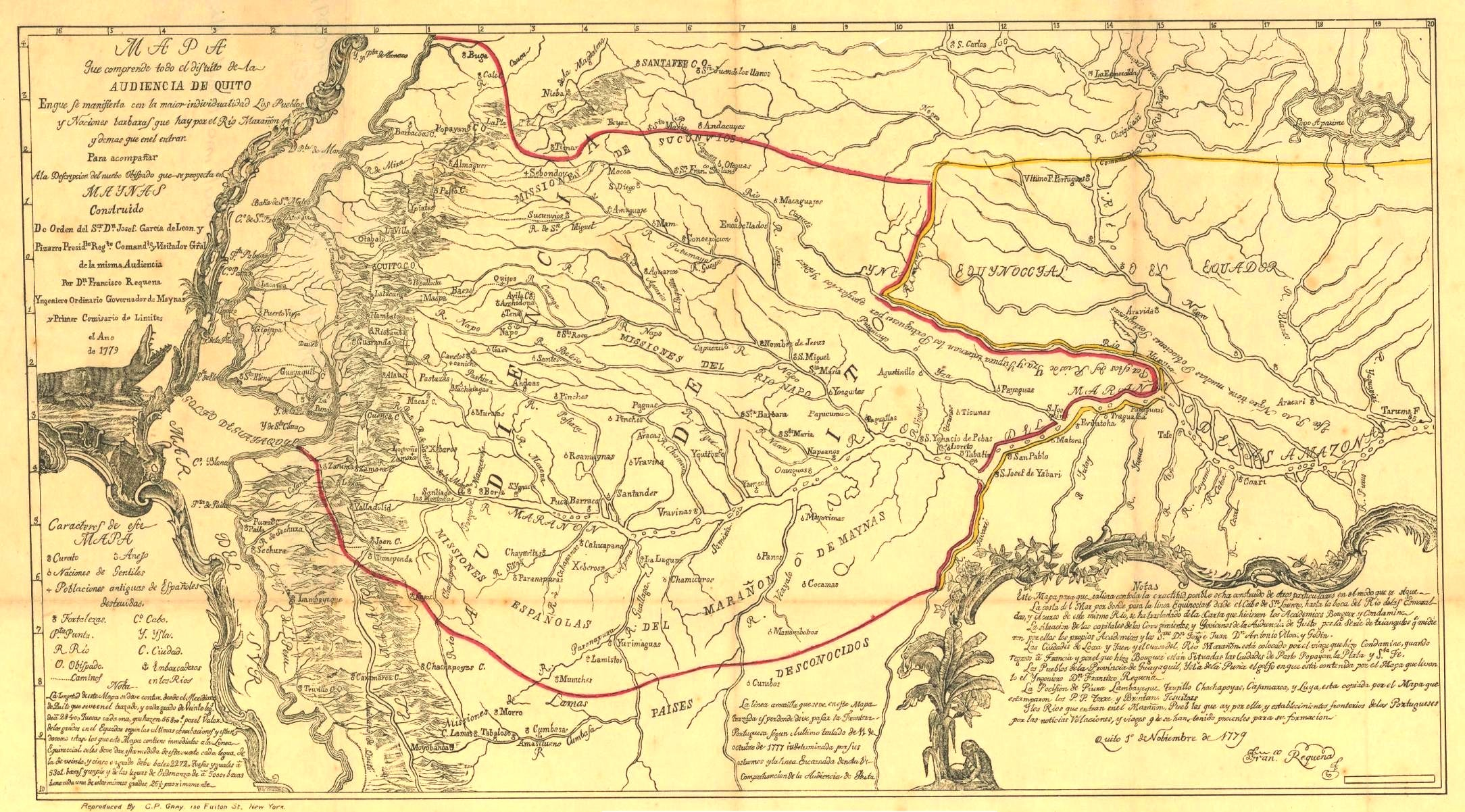
Royal Audience of Quito, a map of 1779 by Francisco Requena y Herrera

Sancho de Paz Miño y García, born around 1505, grandson of Sancho de Paz, was a conquistador of the Quijos-Quichua, the indigenous Amerindians of the Quijos region in modern-day Napo Province, in Ecuador's Amazon basin. Sancho de Paz Miño y García married Ecuadorian-born Ana Jaramillo y Burgos, also a member of a family of Sephardic anusim, the daughter of a wealthy converso merchant, Juan de Burgos.

Sancho de Paz Miño y García and other members of the family were among the founders of Baeza, today the main regional town of Quijos Canton, in Napo Province, Ecuador. By 1566 he was already serving as Alcalde Ordinario of that settlement.

Because of problems owing to his Jewish lineage, he soon found himself living in a dire financial situation and with a reduction of land allotted to him, and so he returned to Llerena, and on July 29, 1569, brought proceedings against the Municipality of Llerena with the aim of proving that he was of hidalgo (noble) lineage, which would then ease the problems relating to the family's Jewish background back in the Audience of Quito.

By 1584, years after his death, his allotment in Baeza was so scarce that his children were left in extreme poverty. Such was the situation that in 1586, as claimed and asserted by various witnesses at the time, his eldest son Cristóbal pleaded with the colonial authorities in Quito for higher rate of rent income and increased land allotment.

=== Branching ===
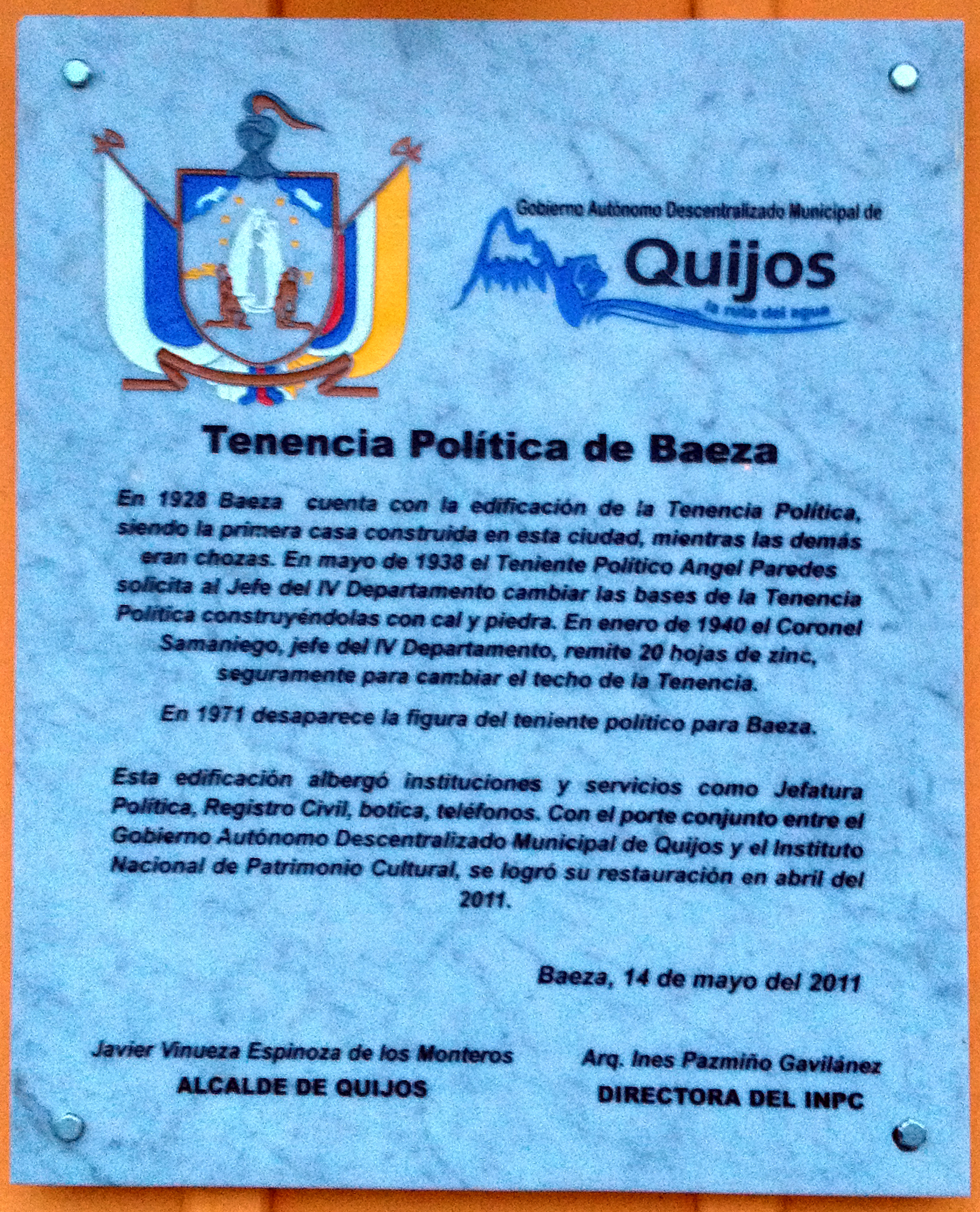
Plaque at the Tenencia Política of Baeza, in Baeza, Ecuador. Signed by Alcalde of Quijos, Mr. Javier Vinueza and Executive Director of Ecuador´s National Institute of Cultural Heritage (INPC), Arch. Inés Pazmiño.

Soon after establishing themselves in the Royal Audience of Quito, members of the family mixed with locals, both in Baeza and then moving the lineage to the administrative capital in Quito. The family then diversified, branching out geographically throughout the colony. Different marriages also resulted in social diversification of the clan.

Initially, they married others also of New Christian Jewish lineages like themselves, then intermarried with those of Old Christian Spanish lineages. Some married with those of hidalgo (Spanish nobility) origin, and others with those of more humble antecedents. Ethnically, they mixed with peninsulars, criollos, and mestizos alike. Much later, those branching out into Ecuador's coastal region, would mix with mulattos.

Among the family's more prolific progeny, Captain Cristóbal Miño Paz y Jaramillo (born c. 1558, not to be confused with his uncle of the same name) on his own, and through his marriage with Petronila Pinque de Troya y Siliceo, sister of the founder of Ibarra, Ecuador (who on her maternal side was of humble Amerindian origins), can claim title to being the source of the great majority of the Pazmiño, especially those from Guaranda.

The descendants of the clan are now numerous in Ecuador, and the surname is mainly found in Ecuador. In Quito alone the list of descendants is extremely long. Outside of Quito, places where the branches of the clan have settled permanently include other cantons of Pichincha province including Machachi, and in various cities around the southern and central Sierra region including Loja in the province of Loja, Guaranda in Bolivar, Cuenca in Azuay, Ambato in Tungurahua, and Latacunga in Cotopaxi. Though less so around the coastal region, there are established branches in the city of Guayaquil in the province of Guayas and in the city of Machala in the province of El Oro. Traditionally, these are the core geographic points where they have lived for generations. More recently, grandchildren or great grandchildren from these nuclei have again set out to other areas around Ecuador, and also abroad.

Some descendants passing on the Paz y Miño variation, produced several Colonial Governors of the City of Quito, including Governor Sancho Paz y Miño.

== Anthroponymy ==
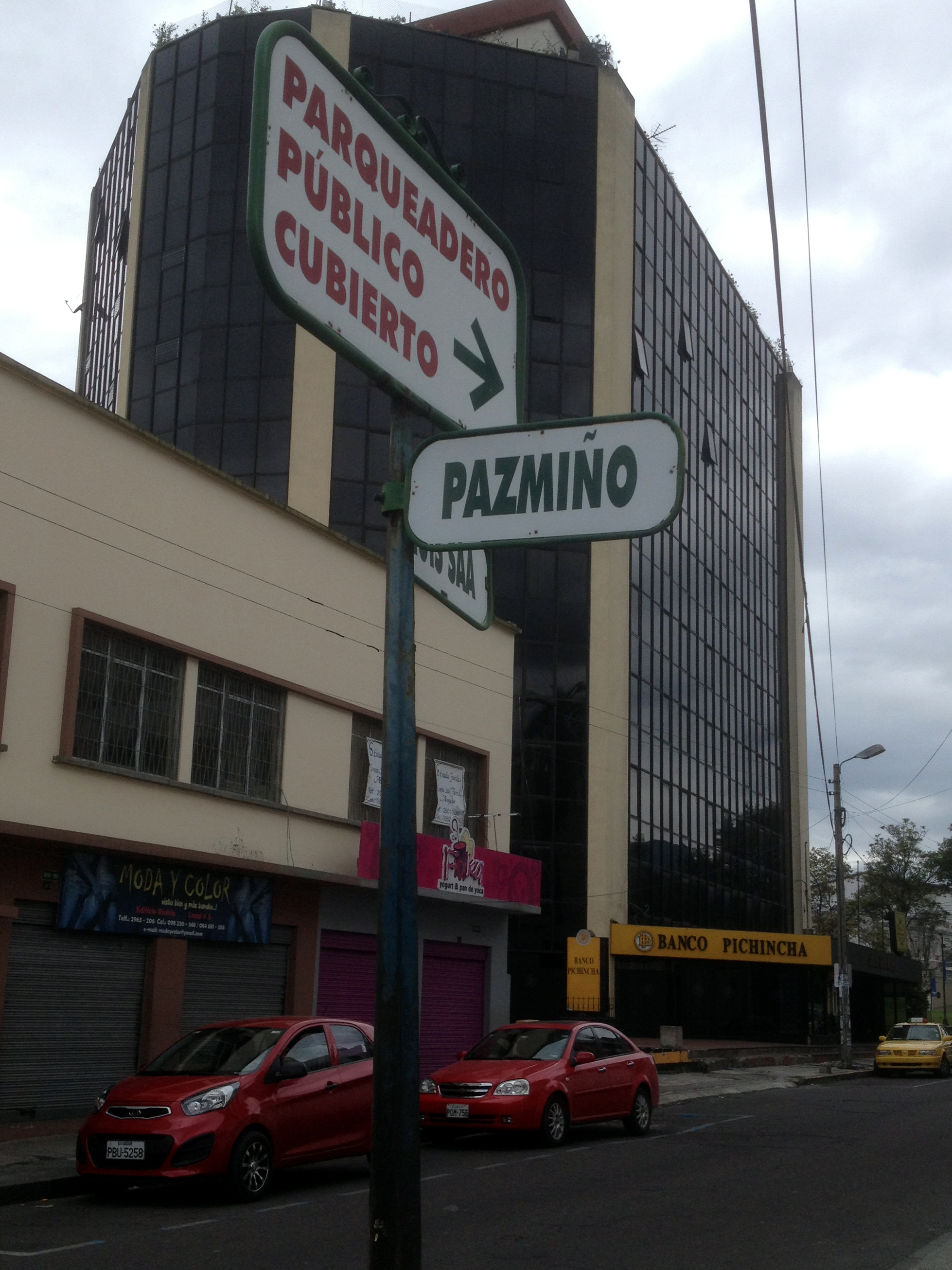
"Pazmiño" street sign in Quito, Ecuador, in honor of the Pazmiño brothers of Latacunga, Ecuador. Ecuadorian Independence heroes who fought against Spanish rule, especially in the assault on the Royal Army Base in Lima, Peru.

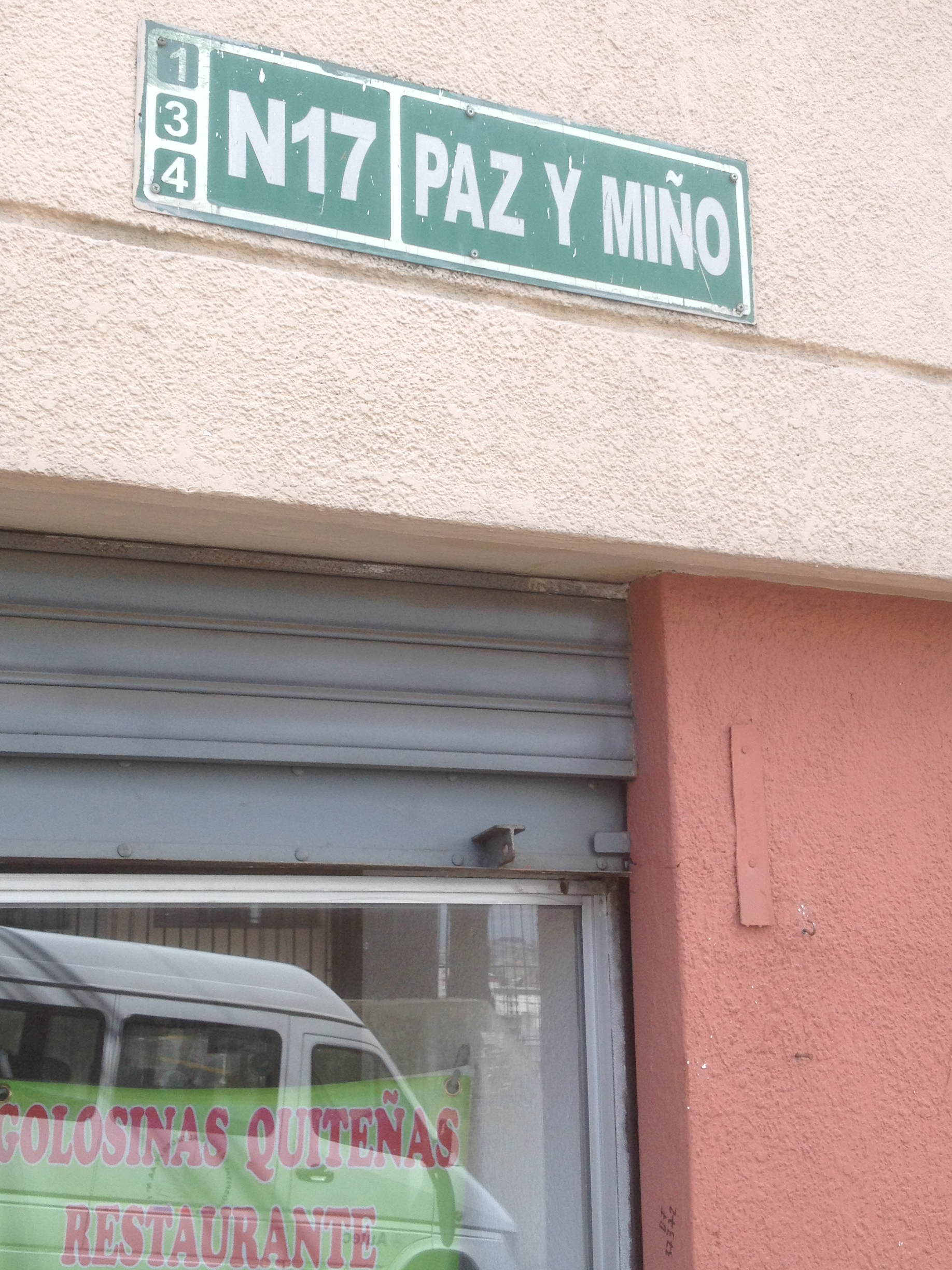
"Paz y Miño" street sign in Quito, Ecuador, in honor of Gen. Telmo Paz y Miño, born in Quito's then-rural parroquia of Chillogallo. First President of the Supreme Military Junta, among various other illustrious titles.

The surname Pazmiño—and all its variations—is a compound surname. It consists of the separate surnames of Paz and Miño. For a brief description of both, please see the sections below.

Ultimately tracing back to Spain, although in a differing ancestral form, Pazmiño is an Ecuadorian Hispanic surname, though not a "Spanish" surname per se. It is relatively rare compared to other Hispanic surnames, even in Ecuador itself.

As a Hispanic surname, it is also rare in that its genesis places it among the few Hispanic surnames of solely judeo-converso origin. That is, Pazmiño as a compound surname is found only among the converso descendants of the original founding family of Jewish origin that converted to Christianity, identifying them as separate from other unrelated lineages of, both Jewish and gentile, Paz families and Miño families. This is in contrast to other Hispanic surnames (such as Sánchez, Pérez, Núñez, even Paz and Miño as separate surnames) which, though they may be found among persons of Sephardi Jewish descent, are in themselves Old Christian Spanish gentile surnames (thus occurring mostly among gentiles), and which only entered the Jewish population as a result of the deliberate adoption of Spanish Old Christian gentile surnames by Sephardic Jews (including Jewish converts to Christianity) to obscure their own origins, or because they were imposed on them upon baptism; forced or otherwise.

=== Paz ===
As a separate Hispanic surname, "Paz" can have three separate origins: Galician, Castilian, and Sephardi Jewish. Within each origin, numerous unrelated lineages exist, especially for patronymics. The surname also exists in Portuguese

==== Galician Paz ====
When "Paz" is of Galician origin, it is a patronymic surname. The Galician "Paz", together with "Páez", "Paes", and "Pais", are the Galician patronymic forms of the Galician given name "Paio."

In Castilian, the given name is "Pelayo" and its Castilian patronymic counterpart is "Peláyez", not "Paz."

==== Castilian Paz ====
When "Paz" is of Castilian origin, it is a descriptive surname meaning 'peace' (from Latin 'pax', genitive 'pacis'), deriving from the Castilian language Marian epithet; "María de la Paz." With this same etymological history, the surname also exists in Portuguese.

==== Sephardi Paz ====
"Paz" is also a rough translation of the Hebrew first name Shlomo (שלמה), meaning Solomon. This translation coincided with the pre-existing Castilian Spanish Old Christian surname "Paz" described above, and was thus often assumed by Jewish-origin New Christians to obscure their Sephardi Jewish origin. In these cases, "Paz" is found among Spaniards and Hispanics of Sephardic Jewish lineage converted to Catholicism. With this same etymological history, the surname also exists as a Sephardic origin Portuguese surname among Portuguese people and Brazilians.

To this day, the surname Paz can be still be found among Sephardic Jews who descend from those who left Spain to remain within the Jewish fold. These emigrated to areas outside the Spanish Kingdom and its colonial possessions in the Americas, beyond the reach of the Inquisition. They moved to various parts of the Ottoman Empire (North Africa, the Balkans in Southern Europe, and the Middle East, including Ottoman Palestine), as well as the Netherlands, England and elsewhere, where they could return to the religion.

When the surname Paz is given a superficial transliteration into the Hebrew language (as פז), the surname in Hebrew is synonymous with "Gold" (Paz), although the literal word for gold is זהב (Zahav). However, a direct translation into Hebrew (as שלום) would render the surname as "Peace" (Shalom). The contextual translation renders it as Shlomo (שלמה, Solomon).

=== Miño ===
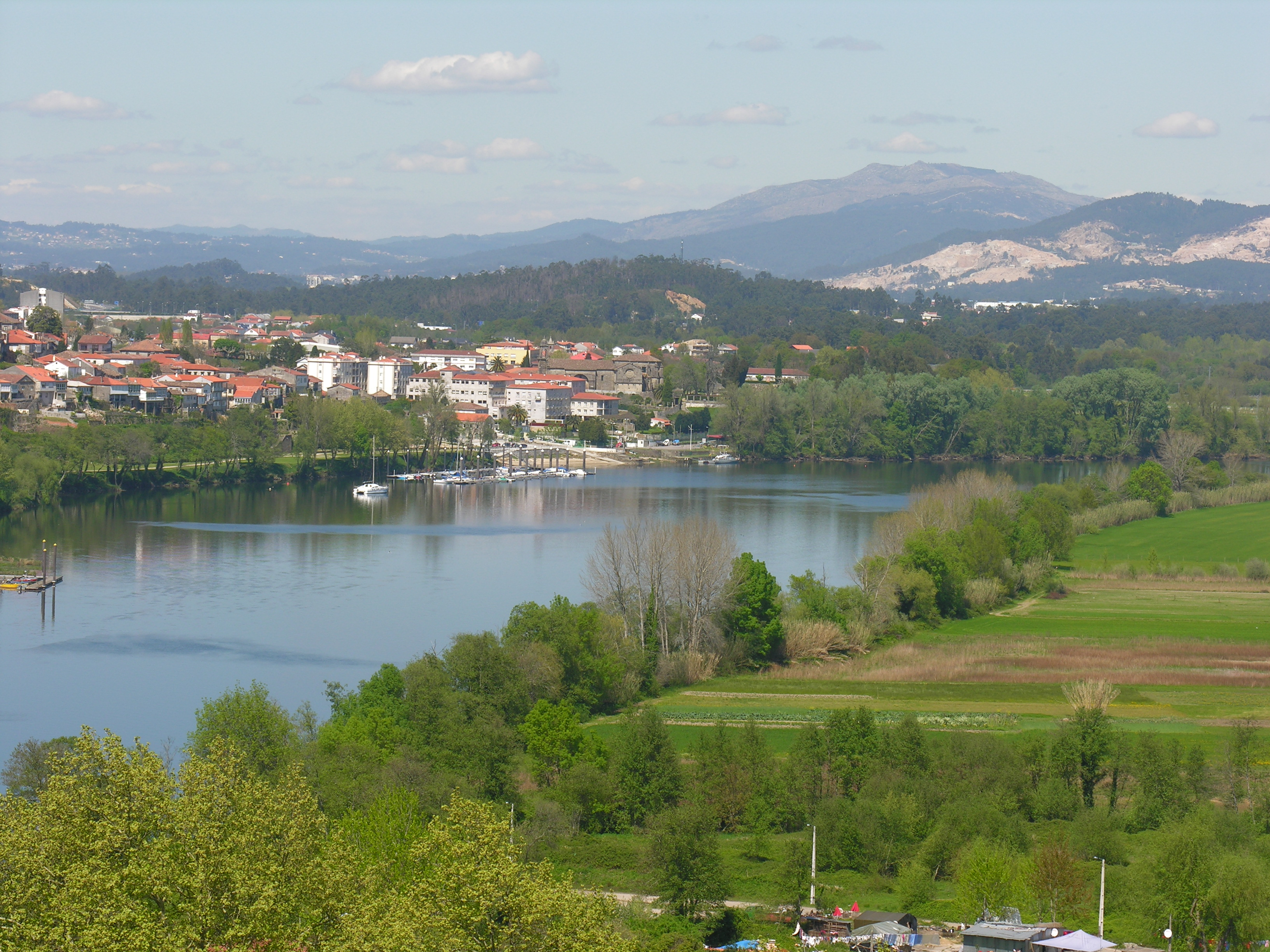
River Miño and Tui, Galicia as seen from Valença, Portugal

The surname "Miño", conversely, has only one language origin. It is a Galician topographic surname adopted by, or imposed upon, a person originally from the banks of the Miño River, or several towns of the same name, traversing Galicia in northeast Spain and flowing into northern Portugal. The river forms a natural border between the two countries.

Etynologically, Miño is derived from a Latin comparative adjective that carries the meaning "Cinnabar-red" (from Latin 'minius', superlative 'minium'). Cinnabar itself is a mercuric sulfide mineral occurring in red crystals. Mercury sulfide is used as a red pigment. The Miño river was named after this mercuric sulfide mineral.

In Spanish naming customs, people carry two surnames, the first paternal the second maternal. According to the National Statistics Institute of Spain, in the year 2010 there were a total of 1,733 people had "Miño" as a surname. Of these, 907 people had it as their paternal surname, 819 as their maternal surname, and 7 as both. Of the total 1,733 persons with Miño as a surname, 1,354 were born in Spain both to Spaniards and foreign-born residents in Spain. A total of 372 of the Miño in Spain were foreign-born persons, of which 217 were Ecuador-born, 60 Argentina-born, 62 Paraguay-born, 7 Chile-born, 5 Uruguay-born, and 21 born in "other" countries.

== Variants of Pazmiño ==
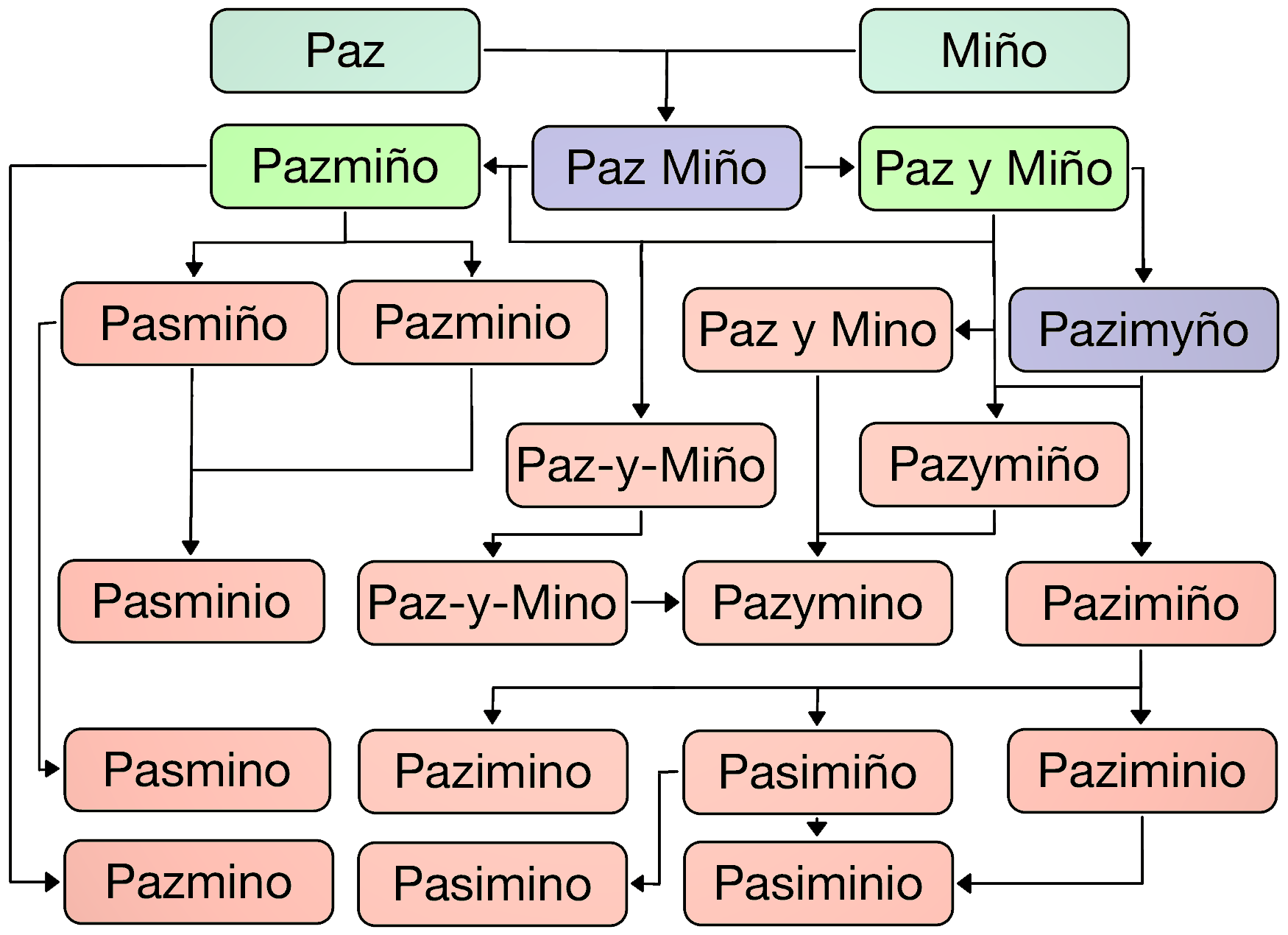
Evolution of the extant and extinct surname variants of the Paz Miño lineage, in no particular chronology.

In the clan's initial two to three generations, the emerging compound surname was not stable, and the two elements kept changing order. The fluctuation was also spurred by the irregular addition of the preposition "de" (meaning "of") and the conjunction "y" (meaning "and"), both of which also frequently changed positions.

Oftentimes the same individuals would variously appear on different colonial documents as "Paz Miño", "Miño Paz", "Paz de Miño", "Miño de Paz", "de Miño y Paz", "de Miño de Paz", "de Paz Miño", "de Pazmiño", "Pazimyño", as well as "Pazmiño" and "Paz y Miño." Ultimately, all these archaic varieties standardized as the latter two: "Pazmiño" and "Paz y Miño."

As standardized forms, both "Pazmiño" and "Paz y Miño" were initially equally as common. Gradually, however, and over the initial generations, many of those who had standardized as "Paz y Miño" eventually consolidated as "Pazmiño." This was partly influenced by the fact that the progeny of the "Pazmiño" had become more numerous, and their form of the surname the most familiar.

Even in birth certificates of more recent generations, one still finds "Paz y Miño" parents with "Pazmiño" children. Similarly, in much the same process, other newer variations which exist today also sprouted from "Pazmiño" and "Paz y Miño."

Among these is "Pasmiño" which evolved from "Pazmiño." "Pazimiño" evolved from "de Paz y Miño." Sancho de Paz y Miño y Garcia was himself sometimes rendered as "Sancho de Pazimiño." "Pazimyño" is an unusual variation of "Pazimiño" which has since died out with all the other archaic forms.

Those that are today "Pazymiño" are mostly the latest evolutions, the product of some "Paz y Miño" who have since migrated to Hispanic countries outside Ecuador, attempting to preserve their surname where those unfamiliar with this Ecuadorian last name, by convention, misidentify it as being solely "Paz" or solely "Miño". Indeed, members of the clan were lost in this process even in the initial generations in Ecuador. Some became "Paz" alone, others became "Miño" alone, henceforth making it difficult to differentiate them from all other "Paz" and "Miño" who derive from various unrelated ancestral lineages.

In non-Hispanic countries, specifically in the English-speaking world, the "ñ" would be dropped and replaced simply with an "n", rendering "Pazymino."

== Distribution ==
The process as described above relates to Ecuador, and all varieties are found in the country to some extent. The Pazmiños are most numerous in Ecuador, both in real numbers and proportional to the population. In greatly reduced numbers, when Pazmiños or those with variations of the surname are found elsewhere, both in the Hispanosphere and outside of it, they are the result of the arrival of Ecuadorian emigrants who took the surname with them over the last couple of centuries. In those cases, what small numbers might be found, the prevalence of the forms of the surname differs by country.

- In Colombia, the prevalent form is Pazmiño, and to a lesser extent Pasmiño, and more rarely Pasminio and Pasiminio.
- In Peru, there are some Paz y Miño, and fewer Paziminio and Pasiminio.
- In Chile, where the surname is largely confined to the southern region of the country, the most prevalent form is Pasmiño, with a scarce number of Pazmiño.
- In countries outside the Hispanosphere, the surnames among immigrants are modified to conform with local languages that lack the diacritical tilde of the Spanish language ñ. In other instances, "Paz y Miño" is rendered "Paz-y-Miño" and "Paz-y-Mino" to avoid accidental partial pronunciation or partial transmission. Others compounded it into "Pazymiño" and "Pazymino."

=== The Pazmiño in contemporary Spain ===
The migration of the colonial era Paz Miño family, who originally introduced the lineage and surname to Ecuador, occurred at the same time the surname itself came into existence some five centuries ago. Spain was therefore left without a native-born Pazmiño population for hundreds of years.

Thus, in the case of Spain, most Pazmiños are recent migrants who arrived in the last 15 to 20 years, as part of the mass economic emigration of Ecuadorians during the Ecuadorian financial crisis of the late 1990s and early 2000s. During this time, some 10% of the total Ecuadorian population left their homeland, the largest number, over half a million, landing in Spain. Beyond these arrivals, the presence of any other Pazmiños in Spain that pre-date the last two decades of Ecuador´s economic instability, are also the consequence of back-migration by Ecuadorians, including their descendants which have since been born in Spain.

==== Statistics ====
===== Pazmiño =====
In 2010, according to the Instituto Nacional de Estadística, Spain's national census agency, of a total resident population in Spain of over 46 million people in that year, 1,683 persons had the surname Pazmiño, whether as their paternal surname, their maternal surname, or as both their maternal and paternal surname.

Of the total 1,638 Pazmiño registered in Spain in 2010, 1,095 were persons who were not of Spanish nationality. All of the Pazmiños who were not of Spanish nationality were of Ecuadorian nationality, except for 13 who were of Colombian nationality, 5 who of Venezuelan nationality, and 12 who of nationality from "other" countries. The census agency, as a matter of policy for privacy concerns, does not tally separately any group by nationality if their total would be less than 5 persons. These are instead put collectively in the "other" group. Of the 588 Pazmiños who of Spanish nationality, these are naturalized Spanish citizens of Ecuadorian descent or Spanish-born descendants of Pazmiños of Ecuadorian-birth or nationality in Spain, plus any which may be attributable to the few Pazmiños in Spain of non-Ecuadorian nationalities or birth.

Table of Pazmiños in Spain by country of origin

Country of birth	Paternal surname	Maternal surname	Paternal & maternal	TOTAL
Spain	291	297	..	588
Ecuador	574	486	5	1,065
Colombia	8	5	..	13
Venezuela	..	..	5	5
Other	6	3	3	12
TOTAL	879	796	8	1,683

===== Paz y Miño =====
According to the same 2010 census data, a total of 6 persons in Spain had the surname "Paz y Miño" as their paternal surname. None had it as their maternal surname. None had it as both their maternal and paternal surname.

In 2010, all six "Paz y Miño" in Spain were not of Spanish nationality. No specific countries of origin were assigned, since 1 or more of the 6 persons were born in a country other than Ecuador, and the census agency does not tally separately any group by country of birth if the total would be less than 5 persons.

As of 2015, an additional 4 people were registered as having "Paz y Miño" as their surname in Spain, making a total of ten persons. None had it as their maternal surname. None had it as both their maternal and paternal surname. Seven of these 10 were now reported to have Spanish nationality, including previously tabulated as non-citizens who have since acquired Spanish nationality by naturalization and/or any new births in Spain to non-national parents in the last 5 years.

===== Other variations =====
As of 2010, no persons with any other variations of the surname, including Pasmiño, Pasiminio, Pazimiño, etc. were registered in Spain.

== Notable people ==
=== Colonial figures ===
- Sancho de Paz Miño y García (c. 1505-1584), judeo-converso conquistador and founder of Baeza, Ecuador.
- Sancho de Paz y Miño, Colonial Governor of the City of Quito
- Juana de Jesús Paz y Miño (1662–1703), mystic and religious woman of the Monasterio de la Purísima Concepción. A foundling left at the doors of the same monastery, and adopted by members of her extended family, Governor Sancho de Paz y Miño and his wife. Died in 1703 unmarried and without descendants.
- Juan Paz Miño, Colonial Franciscan Friar, son of Governor Sancho de Paz y Miño. Baptiser of his adopted sister Juana de Jesús Paz y Miño.
- Francisco de Paz Miño, political figure in the Corregimiento de Quito. Co-signer of the Petitions of the Cabildo to King Felipe IV in 1646.

=== Independence heroes ===
- Tomás Pazmiño, Ecuadorian patriot. Battalion leader of the War of Machachi against the Spanish Army in 1820, proclaiming Machachi's independence.
- Francisco Pazmiño Naranjo, Ecuadorian patriot and member of the battalion at the War of Machachi 1820, led by Tomás Pazmiño against the Spanish Army securing Machachi's independence.

=== Politics, judiciary, diplomacy ===
- Luis Telmo Paz y Miño Estrella (1884–1962), Head of State as Chairman of Supreme Military Junta of Ecuador, 1925
- Diego Morejón Pazmiño, current United Nations Ambassador for Ecuador and Chair of the U.N. Special Committee of the 24 on Decolonization.

=== Academia, literature and journalism ===
- Ismael Pérez Pazmiño (1876–1944), born in Machala, Ecuador, and founder of El Universo newspaper in Guayaquil.
- Robert William Pazmino (1948- ), born in Brooklyn, New York, and Valeria Stone Professor of Christian Education, Emeritus, Andover Newton Seminary at Yale Divinity School.

=== Beauty pageant titleholders ===
- Jennifer Stephanie Pazmiño Saldaña (1987-), Miss International Ecuador 2008, Miss Ecuador Earth 2010, Miss Earth Air 2010.

== See also ==
- Crypto-Judaism
- History of the Jews in Latin America
