= Francisco Arízaga Luque =

President of Ecuador

Acting President of Ecuador
- In office July 14, 1925 – January 10, 1926
- Preceded by: Luis Telmo Paz y Miño
- Succeeded by: Humberto Albornoz

Personal details
- Born: February 6, 1900 Lima, Peru
- Died: October 22, 1964 (aged 64) Guayaquil, Ecuador
- Spouse: Maria Lola Murillo Arzube

Francisco Arízaga Luque (February 6, 1900 – October 22, 1964) was an Ecuadorian poet, writer and politician. He was President of Ecuador from July 14, 1925 to January 10, 1926 as part of the First Provisional Government.

== Early life ==
Francisco Arízaga Luque was born in Lima, Peru on February 6, 1900, while his father was exiled by the liberal regime of Eloy Alfaro. He was the son of Emilia Luque Márquez of Guayaquil, Ecuador and Dr. Manuel Nicholas Arízaga Machuca a lawyer, journalist, and progressive poet.

== College years ==
In 1918 he matriculated to the University of Guayaquil to follow in his father's footsteps to become a lawyer. Later that same year Arízaga was elected president of "la Asociación Escuela de Derecho" and through this position he was able to attend the Third International Congress of the Students.

=== Arízaga the poet ===
In these years his personality was celebrated in the literary circles of the city and the country. His essay "Nocturno Trágico Sentimental" won first prize in the Juegos Florales Universitarios in 1919. It was a sonnet with a modernist slant. The poem, written to frighten the bourgeois, was modeled after the custom of the period. Francisco's articles were bold and deep, they showed an uncompromising character that refused to defect from morality. He was fluent in French and English. He translated Walt Whitman, was an excellent sportsman, and enjoyed playing soccer.

In 1919 he began to write in El Guante (The Glove) and in "El Universal" in 1922 under the pseudonym Max Smeir. In 1919 he met a young María Lola Murillo Arzube and on August 22, 1922 they were married. Soon after Francisco began to work as the understudy of the prominent political scientist Dr. Rómulo Arzube (Febres) Cordero, María's uncle. Dr. Arzube gained the title Solicitor of Successions of the Guayas, from his doctoral thesis, entitled: "Succession because of the death of Ecuadorian civil rights" and "For the slaughter of workers of the 15th of November, the thirst for justice, these are the first men dreaming of a new Ecuador."

== Provisional junta government ==
In 1924 he graduated as lawyer specializing in successions. Then on July 9, 1925 a military revolution exploded. President Gonzalo Córdova was deposed by 50 soldiers under the command of General Francisco Gomez de la Torre. Arízaga followed the news closely and fully supported his friends, the young officials of the Marañón Battalion. They assumed power and created in Quito a "plural government" that would rise "against the authoritarian pretensions of individual control."

Political offices
Preceded by Luis Telmo Paz y Miño	President of Ecuador; 1925—1926	Succeeded by Humberto Albornoz
