= Gonzalo Zaldumbide =

Ecuadorian politician and writer (1884–1965)

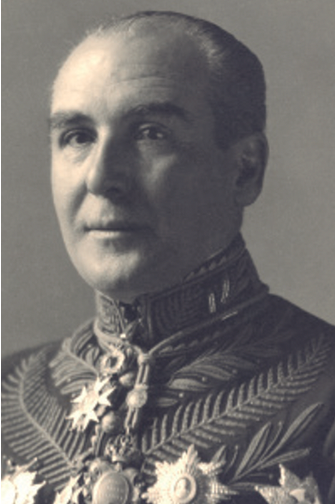

Ecuardorian Foreign minister
- In office 1929–1931
- Preceded by: Homero Viteri Lafronte
- Succeeded by: Modesto Larrea Jijón

Embassy of Ecuador in Paris
- In office 1923–1928
- Preceded by: Enrique Dorn y de Alsúa
- Succeeded by: Carlos Proaño Alvarez

Embassy of Ecuador in London
- In office March 23, 1950 – 1951
- Preceded by: Homero Viteri Lafronte
- Succeeded by: Augusto Dillon Valde

Ecuadorian Ambassador to Chile
- In office 1951–1952
- Preceded by: José Gabriel Navarro
- Succeeded by: Rafael Arízaga Vega

Personal details
- Born: 25 December 1884 Quito
- Died: 30 November 1965 (aged 80)
- Spouse: Isabel Rosales Pareja
- Children: Celia Zaldumbide Rosales

Gonzalo Zaldumbide Gómez de la Torre (25 December 1884 – 30 November 1965) was an Ecuadorian writer and diplomat, born in Quito. He was ambassador to Paris, minister of Foreign Relations (1929) and ambassador to London (1950).

He married pianist and teacher Isabel Rosales Pareja. The couple had a daughter, pianist Celia Zaldumbide Rosales.

== Bibliography ==
- De Ariel, La evolución de Gabriel d'Annunzio (París, 1909)
- Ventura García Calderón, El único gran poeta de nuestro siglo XVIII.
