= Isabel Rosales Pareja =

Ecuadorian piano prodigy

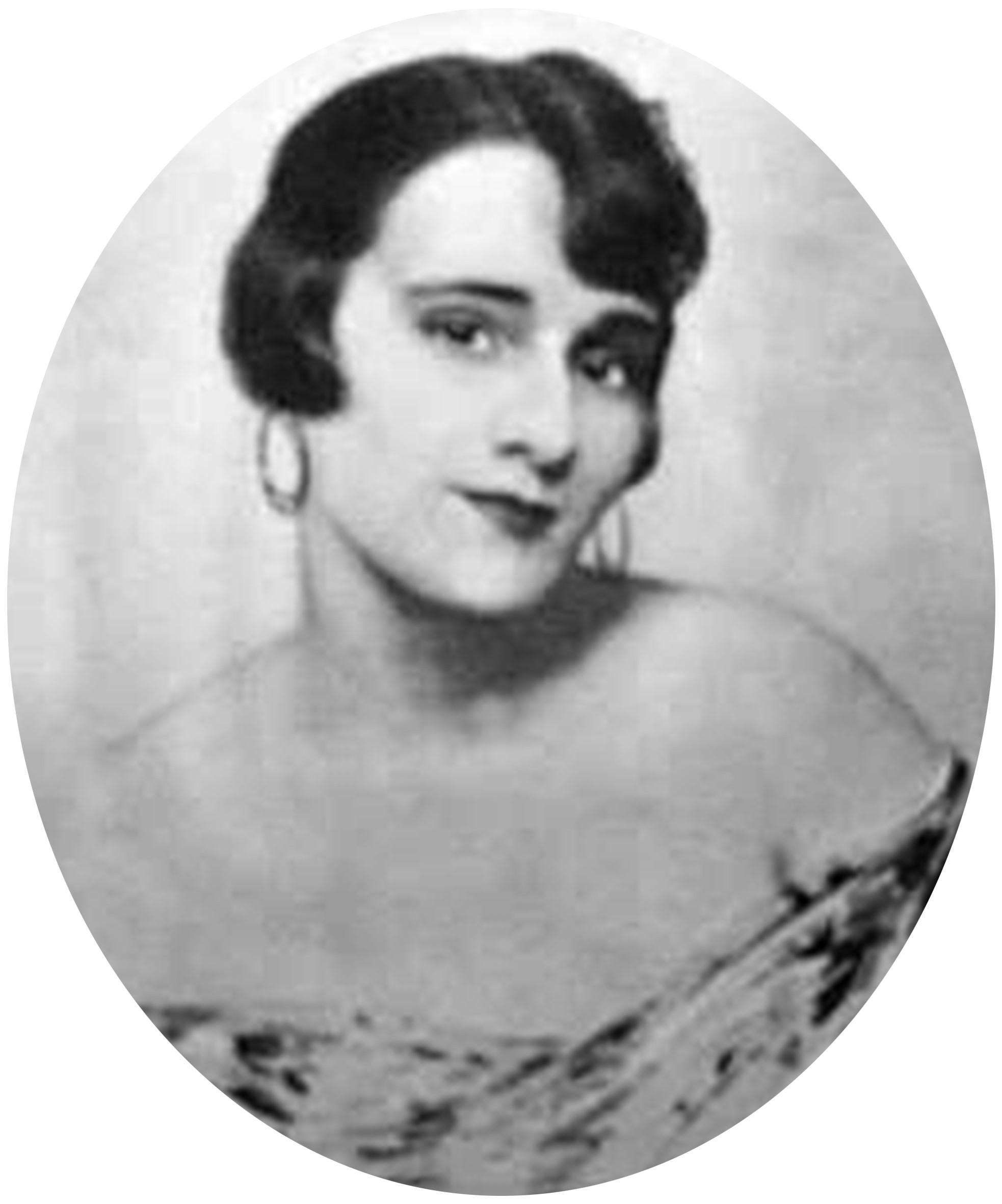
- Born: March 1, 1895; Guayaquil, Ecuador
- Died: April 8, 1961 (aged 66); Quito, Ecuador
- Education: Conservatoire de Paris
- Occupations: Pianist, teacher
- Spouse: Gonzalo Zaldumbide
- Children: Celia Zaldumbide Rosales
- Relatives: Leonor Rosales (sister); Thalie Rosales (sister)

Isabel Rosales Pareja (March 1, 1895 – April 8, 1961) was an Ecuadorian piano prodigy who studied in France, a student of Alfred Cortot.

== Biography ==
Isabel Rosales Pareja was born in Guayaquil on March 1, 1895, the daughter of cocoa farm owners Josefina Pareja Avilés and Carlos Rosales Llaguno.

She studied music in France, standing out as a piano prodigy. She was a student of the Franco-Swiss pianist and conductor Alfred Cortot, and won the first piano prize at the Conservatoire de Paris. She gave recitals and concerts in France and Ecuador. She became known as one of the "Three Muses of Guayaquil", along with her sisters, painter Leonor Rosales and ballet dancer Thalie Rosales.

== Personal life and death ==
She married Gonzalo Zaldumbide, a Quito writer and diplomat. The couple had a daughter, pianist Celia Zaldumbide Rosales, who established the Zaldumbide-Rosales Foundation in her honor.

Isabel Rosales Pareja died in Quito on April 8, 1961.
