= Julio Enrique Moreno =

Acting President of Ecuador (1879–1952)

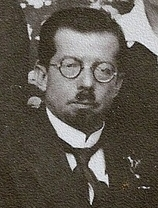

Acting President of Ecuador
- In office 10 August 1940 – 31 August 1940
- Preceded by: Andrés Córdova
- Succeeded by: Carlos Alberto Arroyo del Río
- In office 10 March 1926 – 1 April 1926
- Preceded by: Humberto Albornoz
- Succeeded by: Isidro Ayora

Personal details
- Born: 20 October 1879 Quito, Ecuador
- Died: 2 April 1952 (aged 72) Quito, Ecuador
- Party: Ecuadorian Radical Liberal Party

Julio Enrique Moreno (October 20, 1879 – April 2, 1952) was Acting President of Ecuador from March to April 1926 and again from August to September 1940.

He was President of the Senate from August 1940 to February 1942.

Political offices
Preceded by Humberto Albornoz	President of Ecuador; 1926	Succeeded by Isidro Ayora
Preceded by Andrés Córdova	President of Ecuador; 1940	Succeeded by Carlos Alberto Arroyo del Río
