= Luis Telmo Paz y Miño =

Ecuadorian politician (1884–1962)

President of the Supreme Military Junta
- In office 9 July 1925 – 14 July 1925
- Preceded by: Gonzalo Córdova (as President)
- Succeeded by: Francisco Arízaga Luque

Personal details
- Born: 15 April 1884
- Died: 1962 (aged 77–78)

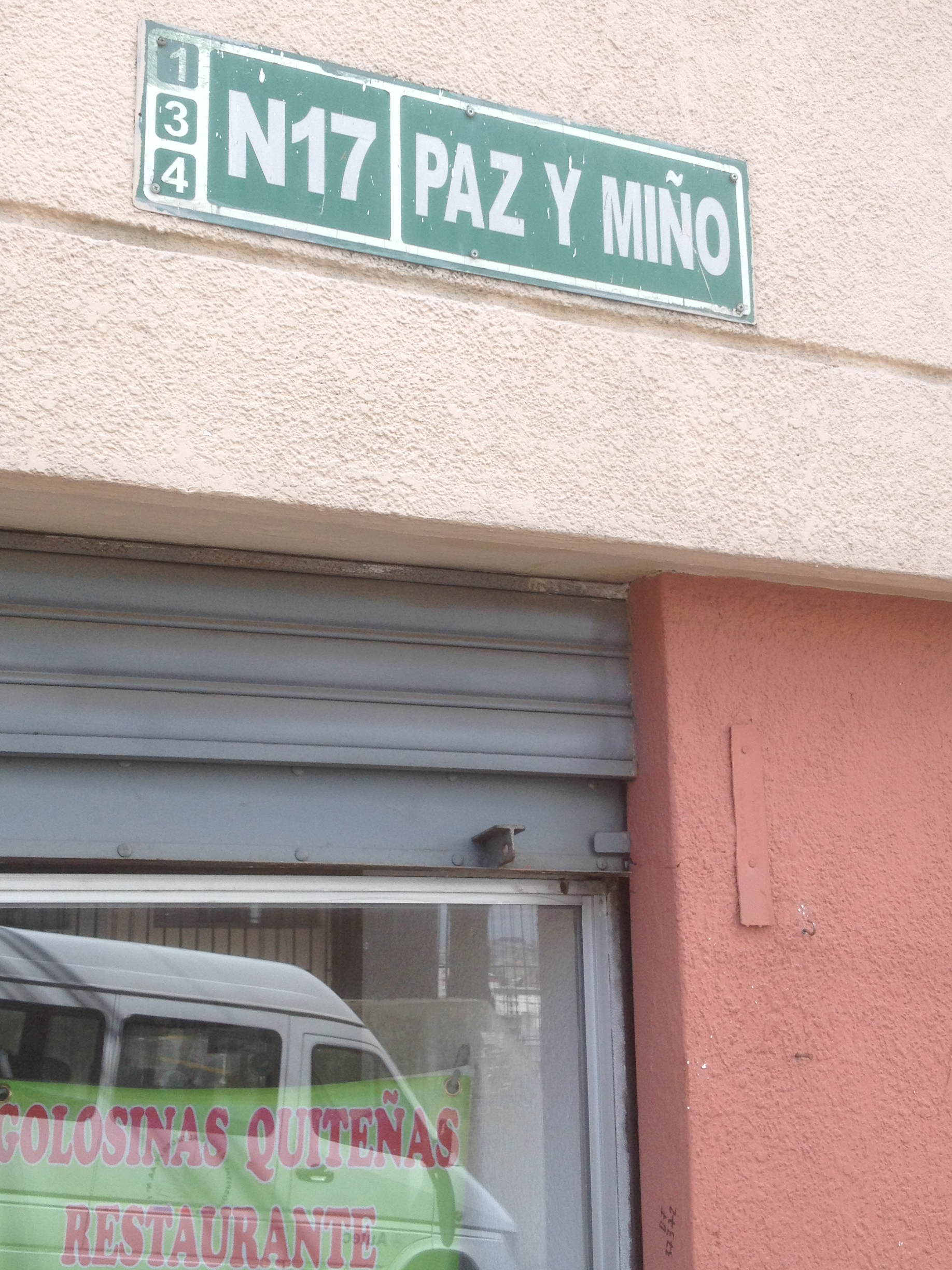
"Paz y Miño" street sign in Quito, Ecuador, in honour of Gen. Telmo Paz y Miño.

Luis Telmo Paz y Miño Estrella (15 April 1884–1962), more commonly known as Telmo Paz y Miño, was President of the Supreme Military Junta of Ecuador in July 1925.

Born in the then-rural parroquia of Chillogallo, in Quito, Ecuador, Gen. Paz y Miño entered military school in 1902.

He held various military and political positions, as well as having been rector of an educational institute. He also wrote various investigative works in geography, history and literature.

Preceded by Gonzalo Córdova	Head of State of Ecuador; 1925	Succeeded by Francisco Arízaga Luque

== See also ==
- Pazmiño
