= Concertaje =

Historical forced labor system in Ecuador

Concertaje was a forced labor system in Ecuador from the 17th century through the early 20th century. Under this system, landowners used unpaid debts of Indigenous workers, conciertos, to lock them into contracts as indentured servants on their haciendas. Breach of such contracts could result in imprisonment. The abolition of slavery in 1851 did not guarantee meaningful power to the newly freed, and they were still exploited and unfree under concertaje. The practice drove rural agriculture in Ecuador, garnering support among organizations like the Sociedad Nacional de Agricultura. Liberals in Ecuador, such as author Luis A. Martínez, fought for its abolition or for the debt of conciertos to be forgiven. These efforts culminated in official abolishment in 1918 under the presidency of Alfredo Baquerizo. Nevertheless, the practice had its defenders afterward, such as Jacinto Jijón y Caamaño's Política Conservadora, whose first volume was published in 1929.
