= Humberto Albornoz =

Ecuadorian politician (1894–1959)

Chairman of Provisional Government Junta
- In office 10 January 1926 – 10 March 1926
- Preceded by: Francisco Arízaga Luque
- Succeeded by: Julio Enrique Moreno

Personal details
- Born: 1894
- Died: 1959 (aged 64–65)

Humberto Albornoz Sánchez (1894–1959) was rotating chairman of the Provisional Government Junta of Ecuador from January 10 to March 10, 1926. He was Minister of Finance in the junta.

Political offices
Preceded by Francisco Arízaga Luque	President of Ecuador; 1926	Succeeded by Julio Enrique Moreno
