= Itchimbía =

Urban parish of Quito, Ecuador

Coordinates: 0.22296°S 78.50002°W

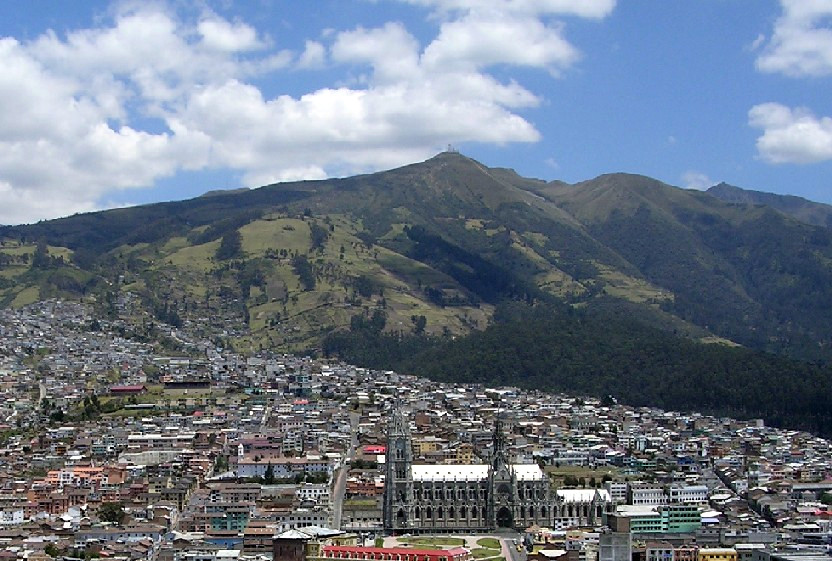
View from atop the Itchimbía hill. In the background (upper part of the photo) is Cruz Loma, a southeastern sidehill of Pichincha Volcano to which the TelefériQo leads. In the foreground (lower left part of the photo) is the hill of San Juan neighborhood with the cathedral known as Basílica del Voto Nacional, a few hundred meters away from Itchimbía.

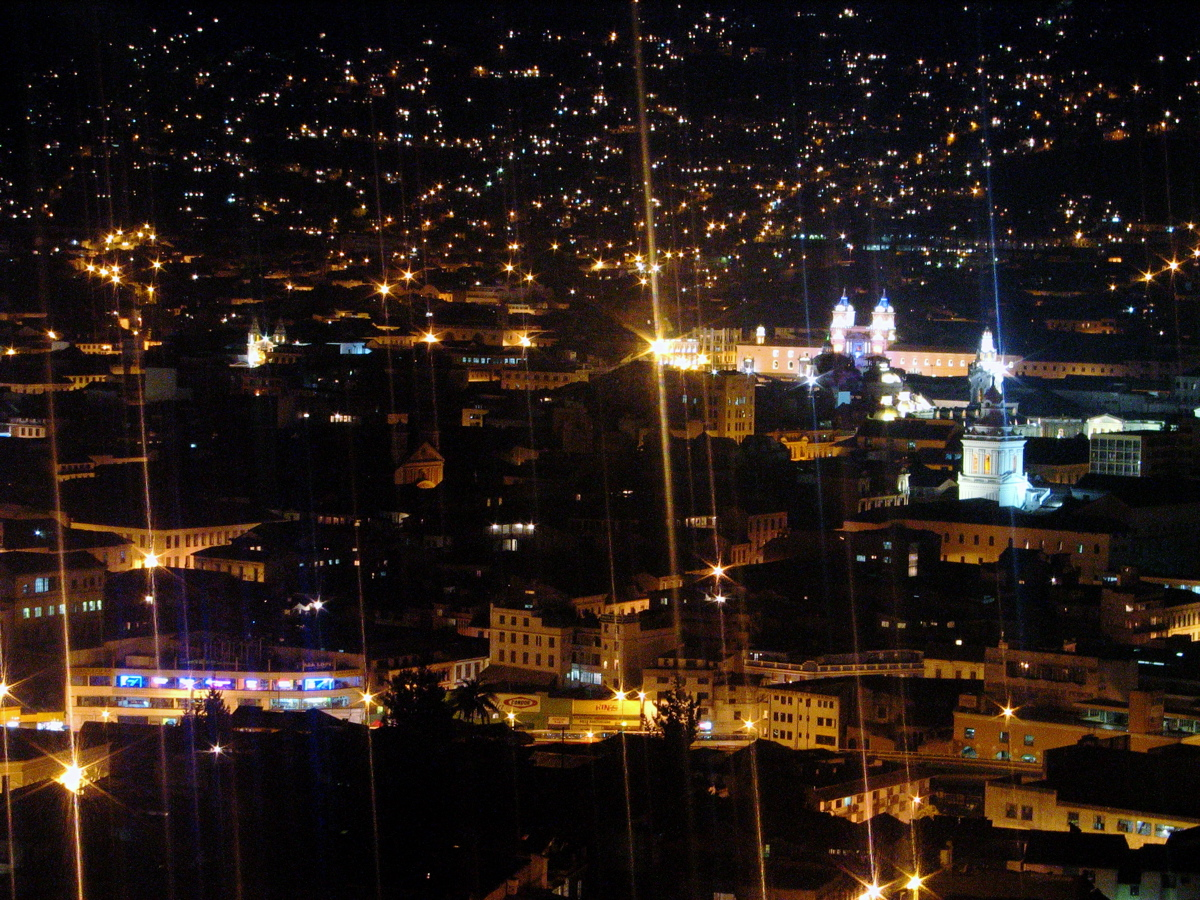
Convento de San Francisco (Saint Francis Convent) (upper right of the photo) as seen from Itchimbía.

Itchimbía is a hill in Quito, Pichincha Province, Ecuador. The Machángara River, originating in the southern part of the city of Quito, is to the east. Itchimbía is on the eastern/northeastern border of downtown Quito and the southeast border of the northern part.

Towards the west Itchimbía is connected to the hill of San Juan neighborhood, a neighborhood between central and northern Quito. Just west of the Itchimbía hill lies La Alameda, one of the largest parks inside the city of Quito, and in which there is an old astronomical observatory simply known as Observatorio Astronómico de Quito (OAQ). The observatory is nowadays owned by Escuela Politécnica Nacional (EPN). On the southwest there is also the Iglesía de San Blas, one of the better known historical churches of the center of Quito. To the south there is a creek that runs across the center of the city and whose water flows into Machángara River.

On the hill there is a park known as Parque Itchimbía or Parque del Itchimbía, which was previously owned by the municipality but is now run by a private environmentalist corporation known as Consorcio Ciudad-Ecogestión. On the top of the hill is a glass house known as es:Centro Cultural Itchimbía, owned by Centro Cultural Metropolitano de Quito, which houses an exhibition center, conference room and museum. Benjamín Carrión Palace was completed in 1948.

The hill and some of its surrounding neighborhoods form a municipal administrative parish (cabildo) of the city of Quito.
