= Celia Zaldumbide Rosales =

Ecuadorian pianist, teacher and cultural manager

- Born: December 2, 1926; Ecuadorian embassy, Paris, France
- Died: August 3, 2014 (aged 87); Quito, Ecuador
- Occupations: Pianist, teacher, cultural manager
- Parents: Gonzalo Zaldumbide (father); Isabel Rosales Pareja (mother)

Celia Zaldumbide Rosales (December 2, 1926 – August 3, 2014) was an Ecuadorian pianist, teacher, and cultural manager. She has been recognized for her contributions to the training of young talents and the creation of cultural centers for the dissemination of art.

== Biography ==
Celia Zaldumbide was born at the Ecuadorian embassy in Paris on December 2, 1926. Her parents were the writer and diplomat Gonzalo Zaldumbide and the distinguished pianist and teacher Isabel Rosales Pareja. She was a student of Alfred Cortot in France, although her first apprenticeship in music was with her mother.

Zaldumbide became one of the most prominent Ecuadorian pianists of the second half of the 20th century. In the 1960s she was president of the National Symphony Orchestra of Ecuador. She was the founder of the House of Music, and in the 1980s, she created the Zaldumbide Rosales Foundation in homage to her mother.

She died in Quito on August 3, 2014, at age 87.

In October 2016, the Villa Celia Cultural Center opened in northern Quito. Named in Zaldumbide's honor, its collection includes works by her and her father.
