= Benjamín Carrión =

Ecuadorian writer and diplomat (1897–1979)

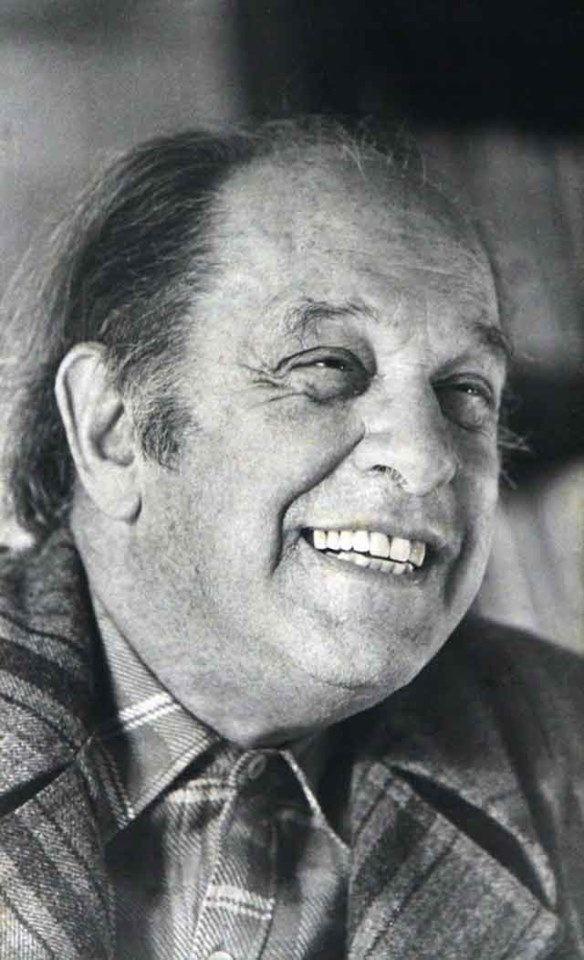
- Born: Manuel Benjamín Carrión Mora; April 20, 1897; Loja, Ecuador
- Died: March 9, 1979 (aged 81); Quito, Ecuador
- Occupations: Writer, diplomat
- Spouse: Águeda Eguiguren Riofrío
- Writing career
- Pen name: Benjamín Carrión
- Notable awards: Premio Eugenio Espejo (1975)

Ecuadorian Ambassador to Mexico
- In office February 1933 – December 1934

Ecuadorian Ambassador to Colombia
- In office 1937–1939

Ecuadorian Ambassador to Chile
- In office 1948–1949
- President: Galo Plaza Lasso
- Preceded by: Carlos Guevara Moreno
- Succeeded by: José Gabriel Navarro

Ecuadorian Ambassador to Mexico
- In office February 1968 – February 1969

Manuel Benjamín Carrión Mora (April 20, 1897 in Loja – March 9, 1979 in Quito) was an Ecuadorian writer, diplomat and cultural promoter.

== Biography ==
He was born into an aristocratic family in Loja. He was a lawyer by training, and occupied various positions in the public arena, including Minister of Education and legislator. He was also a diplomat in several countries of Europe and the Americas and most notably served as the ambassador to Mexico and Chile.

Carrión was also a professor at the Central University of Ecuador, and a journalist. In this later capacity he founded the newspaper El Sol with Alfredo Pareja Diezcanseco. Due to his political views, he was close to the socialist and later communist realms of Ecuadorian society.

In 1934 he published what many critics consider to be his greatest work, Atahuallpa, a biography of the Spanish conquest of the Inca Empire, which has been translated into English and French.

In 1944, he founded the Casa de la Cultura Ecuatoriana (House of Ecuadorian Culture) and became its first President. He was a tireless crusader for the House, and despite great odds, was able to inaugurate its first and main building in May 1947. The building stands now as an icon of the city of Quito. Benjamín Carrión Palace was completed in 1948.

From the beginning he emphasized the importance of the House's Museums, Library and Press. He published the influential literary magazine Letras del Ecuador under the direction of among others, his nephew Alejandro Carrión. He also published a number of key Ecuadorian authors.

The House of the Culture has, in its more than 20 years of work, supported a multitude of writers and painters both inside and outside the country. It has also allowed for Ecuadorian culture to be known in the international field. Though his legacy as a writer can be considered controversial in importance, he stands as Ecuador's foremost promoter of culture.

== Awards and honors ==
- 1968: Benito Juárez Prize (Mexico)
- 1975: The first recipient of Ecuador's highest national prize Premio Eugenio Espejo

== Bibliography ==
- El desencanto de Miguel García (1929)
- Obras de Benjamín Carrión
- Nuevas Cartas al Ecuador
- Los Creadores de la Nueva América
- Mapa de America (1931)
- San Miguel de Unamuno
- Santa Gabriela Mistral
- Puerto Rico
- Índice de la Poesía Ecuatoriana Contemporánea
- Por Qué Jesús No Vuelve
- El Santo del Patíbulo
- Atahuallpa (1934)
- El Cuento de la Patria
- El Nuevo Relato Ecuatoriano
- El Libro de los Prólogos
- El Pensamiento Vivo de Juan Montalvo
- América Dada al Diablo
- Correspondencia de Benjamín Carrión
