= Gonzalo Córdova =

Ecuadorian politician (1863–1928)

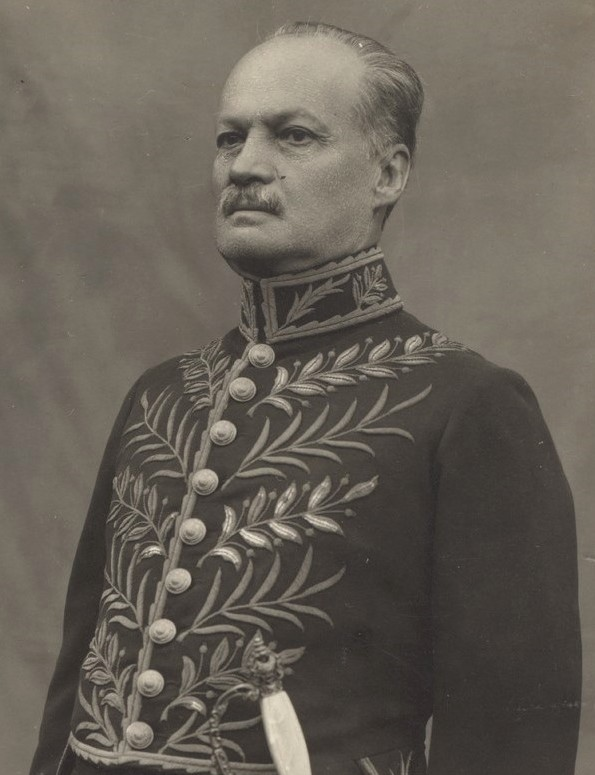

21st President of Ecuador
- In office 1 September 1924 – 9 July 1925
- Preceded by: José Luis Tamayo
- Succeeded by: Luis Telmo Paz

Personal details
- Born: 15 July 1863 Guayaquil, Ecuador
- Died: 13 April 1928 (aged 64) Valparaíso, Chile
- Party: Radical Liberal

Gonzalo Segundo Córdova y Rivera (15 July 1863 – 13 April 1928) was President of Ecuador from 1924 to 1925. Like his immediate predecessors in the Liberal Party, he was considered to be a pawn of "La Argolla" ("the ring"), a plutocracy of coastal agricultural and banking interests whose linchpin was the Commercial and Agricultural Bank of Guayaquil led by Francisco Urbina Jado.

Popular unrest, together with an ongoing economic crisis and a sickly president, laid the foundations for a bloodless coup d'état against Córdova in July 1925. Unlike previous coups in Ecuador, the 1925 coup was in the name of a collective grouping, the League of Young Officers, rather than a particular caudillo.

He was President of the Senate in 1918.

Preceded by José Luis Tamayo	President of Ecuador; 1924–1925	Succeeded by Luis Telmo Paz
