= Andrés Córdova =

Acting President of Ecuador (1939 - 1940)

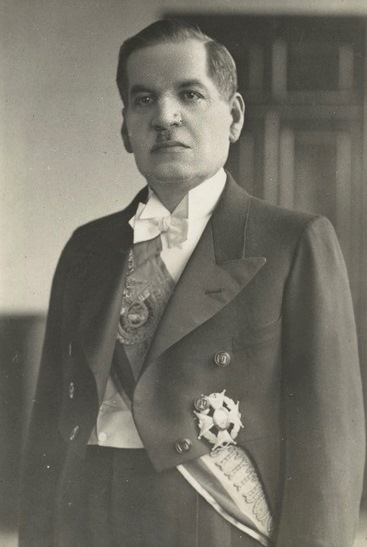

President of Ecuador
- Interim; 11 December 1939 – 10 August 1940
- Preceded by: Carlos Alberto Arroyo del Río
- Succeeded by: Julio Enrique Moreno

Personal details
- Born: 8 May 1892 Cañar, Ecuador
- Died: 3 October 1983 (aged 91) Quito, Ecuador
- Resting place: National Pantheon of Heads of State of Ecuador
- Party: Ecuadorian Radical Liberal Party

Andrés Fernández de Córdova Nieto (8 May 1892 – 3 October 1983) was the President of Ecuador on an interim basis from December 1939 to August 1940. He was President of the Chamber of Deputies from February 1939 to August 1940.

He later ran in the presidential election of 1968, losing to José Maria Velasco Ibarra.

== Sources ==
- http://www.worldstatesmen.org/Ecuador.html
- Rulers.org

Political offices
Preceded by Carlos Alberto Arroyo	President of Ecuador; 1939–1940	Succeeded by Julio Enrique Moreno
