= Chillogallo =

Urban parish of Quito, Ecuador

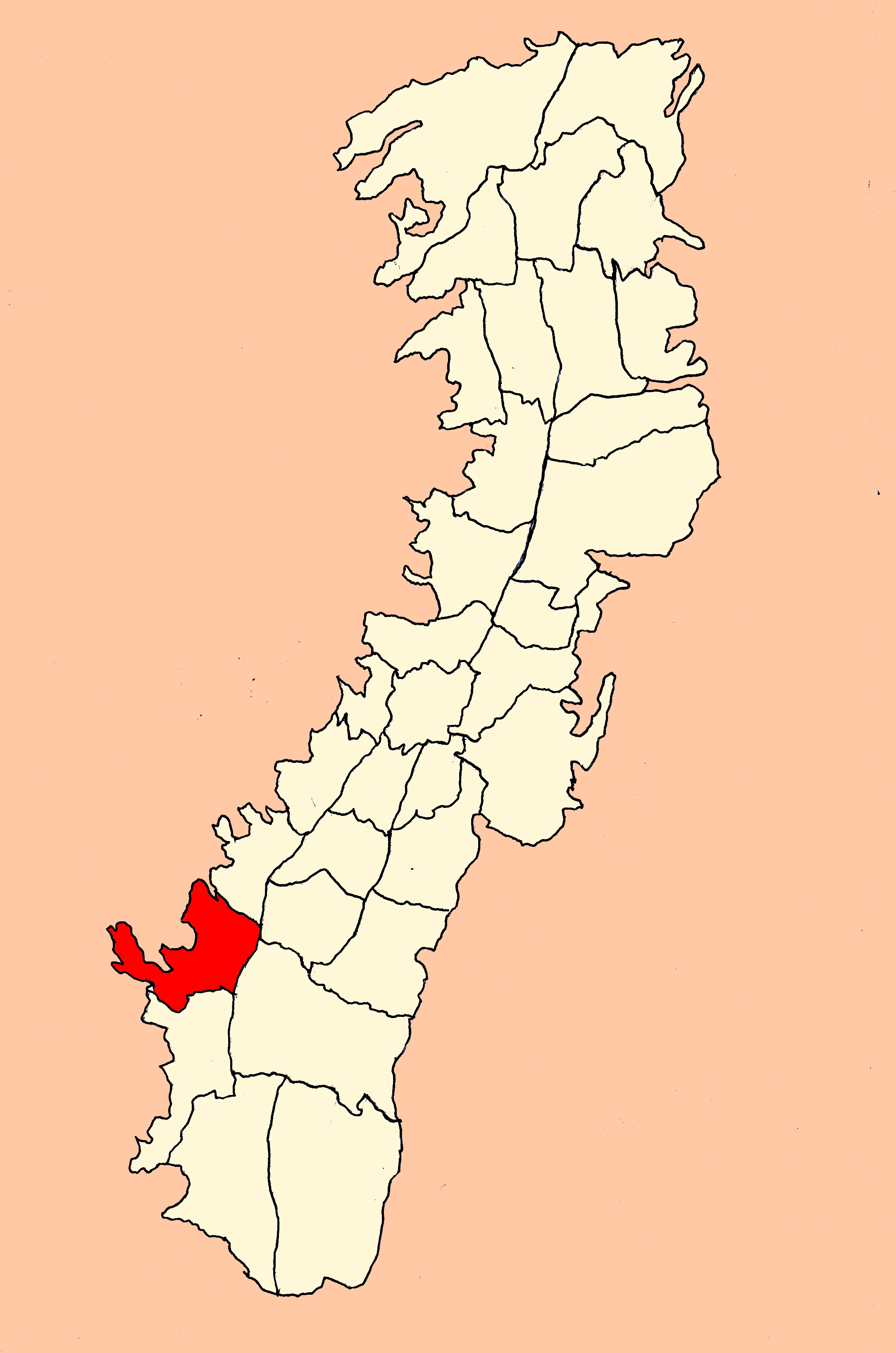
Chillogallo Parish (Quito, Ecuador)

Chillogallo is an urban parish of the city of Quito, Ecuador. It is located in the southern part of the city.
