= Isidro Ayora =

Ecuadorian politician

His Excellency Isidro Ayora
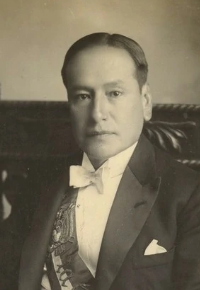

22nd President of Ecuador
- In office 17 April 1929 – 24 August 1931
- Preceded by: Himself (as Interim President)
- Succeeded by: Luis Larrea Alba

Interim President of Ecuador
- In office 1 April 1926 – 17 April 1929
- Preceded by: Julio Enrique Moreno
- Succeeded by: Himself (as President)

Personal details
- Born: Isidro Ramón Antonio Ayora Cueva; 31 August 1879 Loja, Ecuador
- Died: 22 March 1978 (aged 98) Los Angeles, California, U.S.
- Party: Ecuadorian Radical Liberal Party
- Spouse: Laura Carbo Nuñez (m. 1917; died 1946)
- Education: Central University of Ecuador
- Profession: Doctor

Isidro Ramón Antonio Ayora Cueva (31 August 1879 – 22 March 1978) was an Ecuadorian political figure. He served as the 22nd President of Ecuador from 1926 to 1931. Isidro Ayora, a town in Guayas, and Puerto Ayora, are named after him. Some people call coins ayora because they were introduced by him.

Upon his death in 1978 at age 98, Ayora was the longest-living Ecuadorian president. His record was surpassed by Guillermo Rodríguez in 2023 when Rodríguez turned 100.

== Honours ==
- 1930: Grand Cordon in the Order of Leopold.

== Bibliography ==
- ISIDRO AYORA CUEVA. diccionariobiograficoecuador.com
- Dictadura Del Dr. Isidro Ayora Cueva. explored.com.ec

Political offices
Preceded by Julio Enrique Moreno	President of Ecuador; 1926–1931	Succeeded by Luis Larrea Alba
Records
Preceded by Borys Martos	Oldest living state leader 19 September 1977 – 22 March 1978	Succeeded by Celâl Bayar
