= Alfredo Baquerizo =

Jurist and 19th President of Ecuador

Alfredo Baquerizo Moreno
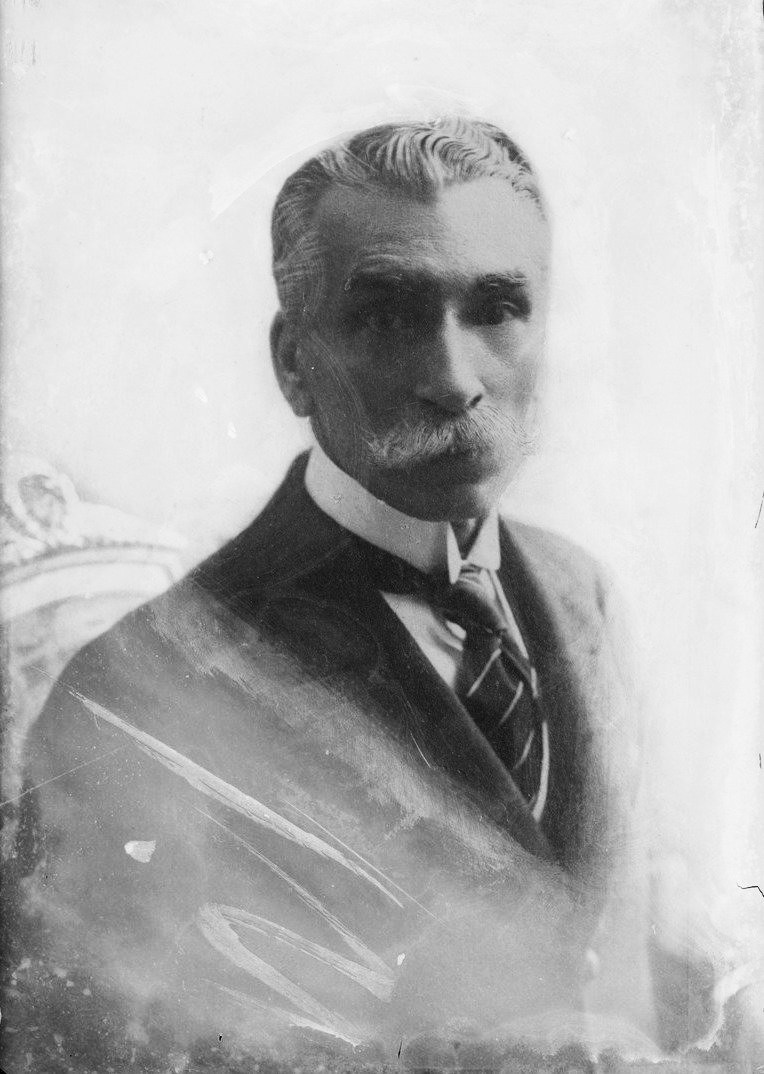

Acting President of Ecuador
- In office 1 October 1931 – 31 August 1932
- Preceded by: Luis Larrea Alba
- Succeeded by: Carlos Freile Larrea
- In office 1 August 1912 – 30 September 1912
- Preceded by: Francisco Andrade Marín
- Succeeded by: Leónidas Plaza

19th President of Ecuador
- In office 1 September 1916 – 31 August 1920
- Preceded by: Leónidas Plaza
- Succeeded by: José Luis Tamayo

Vice President of Ecuador
- In office 1 September 1905 – 15 January 1906
- President: Lizardo García
- Succeeded by: Abolished
- In office 1 October 1903 – 31 August 1905
- President: Leónidas Plaza
- Preceded by: Carlos Freire Zaldumbide

Personal details
- Born: Alfredo Baquerizo Moreno; 28 September 1859 Guayaquil, Ecuador
- Died: 20 March 1951 (aged 91) New York City, US
- Party: Ecuadorian Radical Liberal Party
- Spouse: Piedad Roca Marcos (m. 1872; died 1937)

Alfredo Baquerizo Moreno (28 September 1859, in Guayaquil – 20 March 1951, in New York) was an Ecuadorian politician, statesman, lawyer, professor, essayist, writer, poet and diplomat who was the 19th President of the Republic of Ecuador. Holding numerous positions in public office, Baquerizo was one of Ecuador's most respected Presidents. Alfredo Baquerizo Moreno is a descendant of the prominent House of Baquerizo.

Often referred to as the "President-Gentleman" for his oratory skills and temperament, Alfredo Baquerizo Moreno served as President of the National Congress of Ecuador for 9 terms, more than any other figure in history, and is frequently likened by historians to the Roman statesman Cincinnatus, for his adherence to civic virtue and stoic rule.

== Positions ==
- Consular Judge of Commerce: 1887 - 1891
- Guayaquil City Councilman: 1894 - 1898
- Secretary to the Minister of the Superior Court of Justice: 1896 - 1900
- Judge of the Superior Court of Justice: 1894 - 1901
- Mayor of Guayaquil: 1890 - 1896
- Justice Minister of the Superior Court: 1896 - 1899
- President of the Superior Court of Justice: 1899 - 1903
- Minister of Foreign Affairs: 1902 - 1903
- Chief Diplomatic Minister to Cuba: 1903 - 1904
- Vice-president of Ecuador: 1903 - 1907
- Acting President of Ecuador: 1905
- Chief Arbitrator of the Ecuadorian Railway: 1912
- Vice-director of the Junta De Beneficia de Guayaquil: 1912 - 1915
- National Senator for the Guayas Province: 1912 - 1915
- President of the National Senate: 1912 - 1915
- Acting President of Ecuador: 1912 - 1913
- President of Ecuador: 1916 - 1920
- Special Ambassador to Peru: 1924
- National Senator for the Guayas Province: 1928 - 1931
- President of the National Senate: 1928 - 1931
- Acting President of Ecuador: 1931 - 1932

== Early life and education ==
Alfredo Baquerizo Moreno's flair for literature and classics originated from his time at the San Gabriel School, where he graduated with a bachelor's degree.

During his time at the school, Baquerizo established himself as a brilliant pianist, composing and interpreting numerous musical pieces. In 1872, Baquerizo graduated from the National Conservatory of Music, entering the Central University of Ecuador in 1877, where he studied law for six years, serving as a student of Supreme Court Justice Alejandro Cárdenas Proaño.

During his time studying law, Baquerizo became a very close personal friend of President Ignacio de Veintemilla, frequently submitting literary contributions and musical compositions, dedicated to the President's niece, Marietta. In 1883, Baquerizo graduated from the Central University of Ecuador with a First Class Medal in Law. Baquerizo later became a Professor of Law at the University of Guayaquil.

== Literary Works ==
Baquerizo Moreno's literary style is characterized by its classical influences and liberal perspectives. His poetry is noted for its irony, while his novels often delve into social and psychological themes. As a corresponding member of the Spanish Language Academy, his contributions to literature were recognized both nationally and internationally.

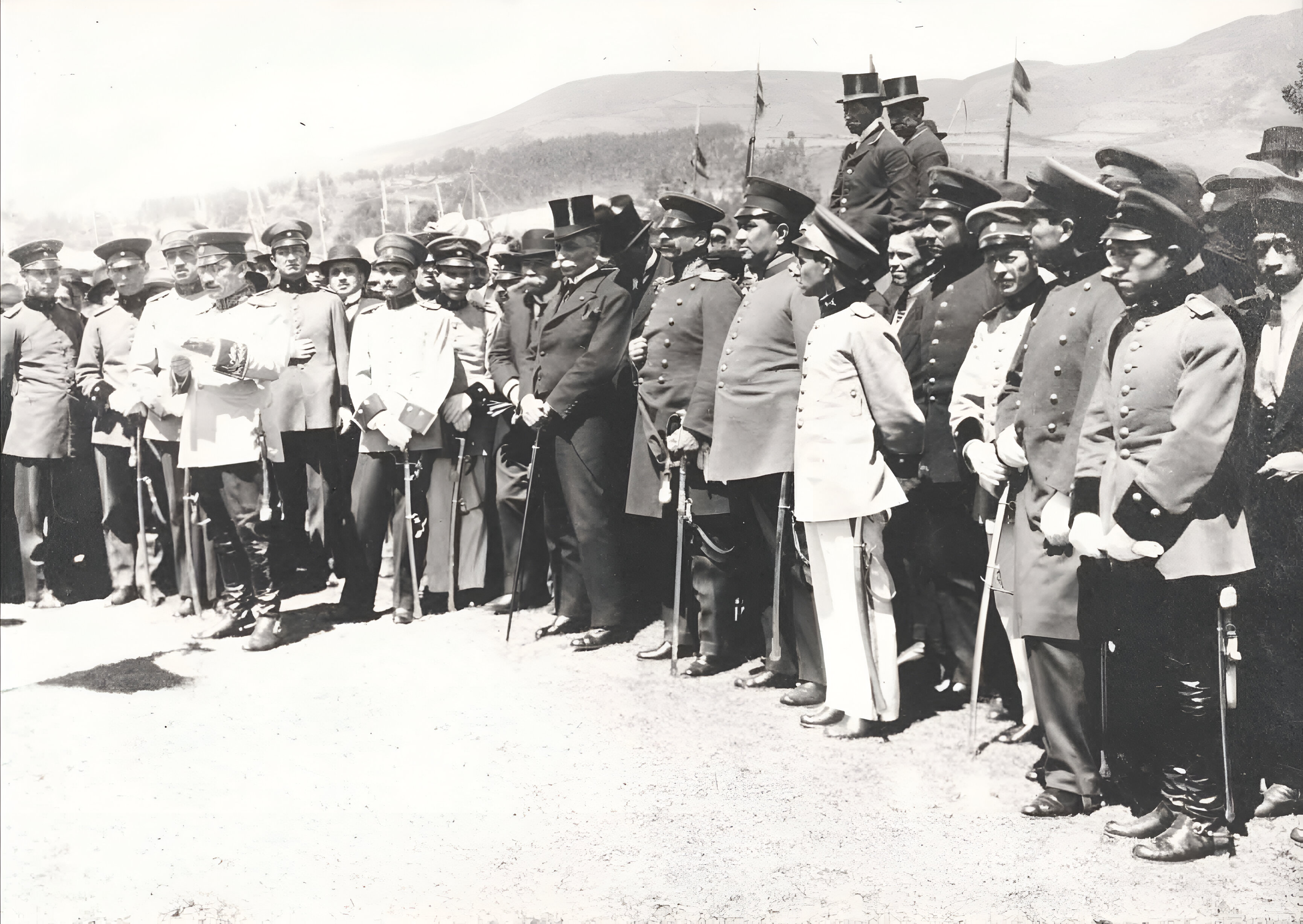
Alfredo Baquerizo at an event, around 1920.

In his early years, Baquerizo wrote several sonnets and silvas, which were compiled in 1881 in Quito in a two-part collection of poems. In 1882, his 102-page "Poetic Essays", inspired by Spanish poet Gustavo Adolfo Bécquer, was published in Guayaquil. Written with his friends Nicolás Augusto González Tola and Juan Illingworth Icaza, it was gentle, sentimental, and Becquerian. With González, he published the historical drama "Love and Homeland."

=== Novels ===
- Titania (1893): A proto-modernist novel considered a reactionary response to end-of-the-century liberalism.
- El Señor Penco (1901): Explores the complexities of human psychology and the obsession with wealth, ultimately questioning the value of material success.
- El Nuevo Paraíso (1910): A satirical fable critiquing utopian ideals.
- Tierra Adentro (1937): A travel narrative blending personal reflection with social commentary.

=== Poetry ===
- Rumores del Guayas (1881): A collection capturing the essence of Guayaquil's landscapes and sentiments.
- Ensayos Poéticos (1882): Poems influenced by Gustavo Adolfo Bécquer, noted for their irony and refined taste.
- "Amor y Patria" (1882): A historical drama intertwining themes of love and national identity.
- "Sonata en Prosa": A prose piece published in the Álbum Ecuatoriano, showcasing his lyrical prowess.

=== Essays and articles ===
- Memorias de Negocios Eclesiásticos (1902): Discusses the relationship between the Ecuadorian state and the Catholic Church
- De Ayer y de Hoy: A miscellany reflecting on past and contemporary issues.
- Traducciones y Ensayos sobre Horacio (1949): Demonstrates his engagement with classical literature through translations and analyses of Horace's works.

== Legal career ==
Baquerizo dedicated his early career to the legal arts. In 1887, Baquerizo was appointed as Consular Judge of Commerce. In 1899, he was appointed as Justice Minister of the Ecuadorian Superior Court, occupying the Presidency of the Superior Court two years later.

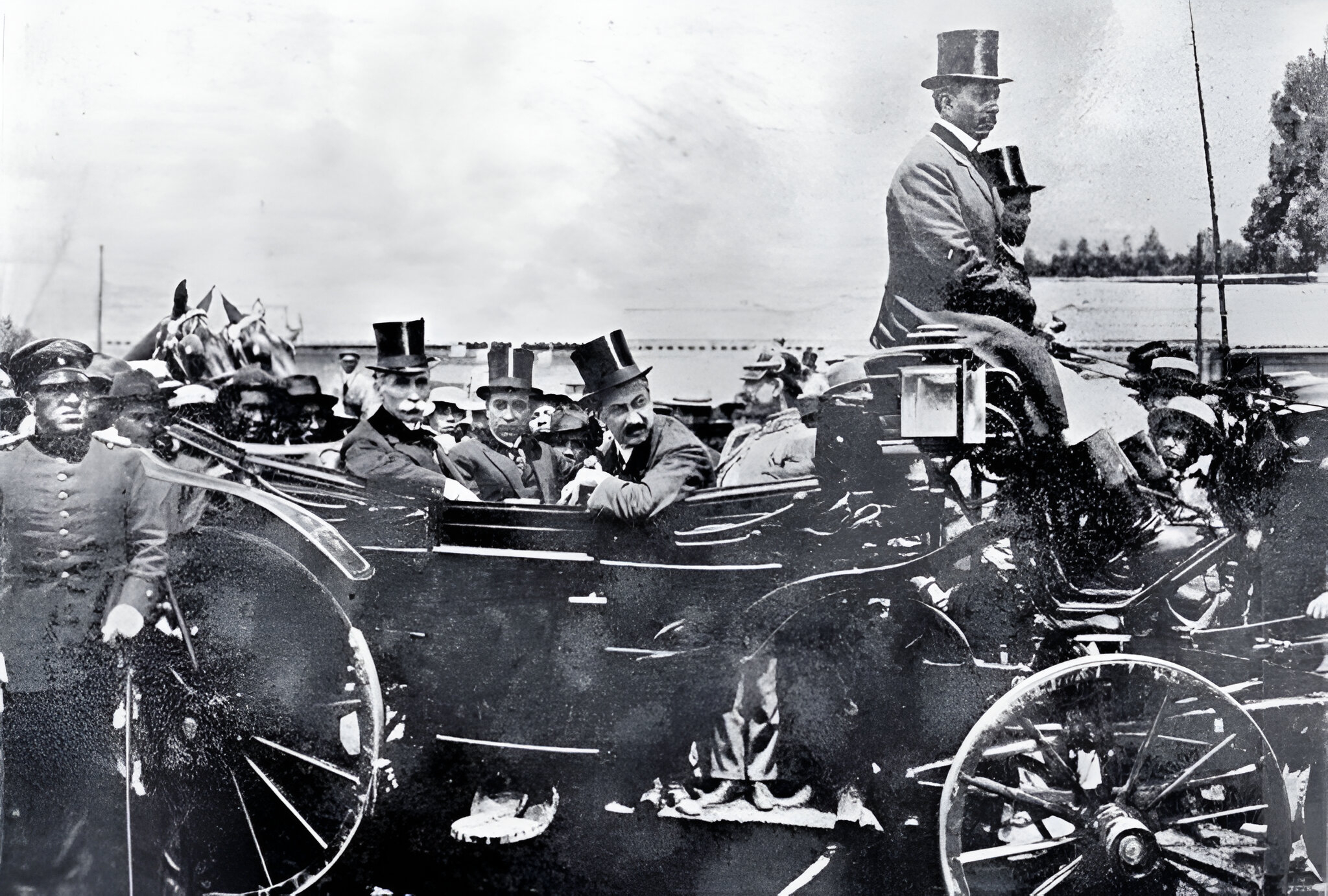
Baquerizo being drawn by carriage during Inauguration Celebration, 1916

=== 1901 Valparaiso Intelligence Officer Assassinations ===
Whilst Baquerizo mainly used his legal education to write complex essays questioning constitutional manners, and holding senior Judgeships for the Ecuadorian State, he never practised privately. However, in 1901, Alfredo Baquerizo Moreno travelled to Valparaíso, defending his brother Enrique Baquerizo Moreno in the court of law, as he was one of the accused in the scandalous murder of the Ecuadorian consul Alberto Arias Sánchez.

His brother, Enrique Baquerizo Moreno, had been placed in exile in Valparaiso, Chile, by the President of Ecuador Eloy Alfaro, due to Enrique posing a significant political threat to Alfaro's rule. Alfaro had positioned his Chief Intelligence Officer Alberto Arias Sánchez as Chief Consul to Chile, in order to spy on the Ecuadorian exiles and ensure that they were not planning to return to Ecuador and overthrow Alfaro.

One morning, Alberto Arias Sánchez was found dead on a bench facing the sea, with a bullet in his temple, a revolver in his right hand and both of his ears severed from his body (found later in the sea). Whilst the perpetrators had attempted to stage it as a suicide, a two-day police investigation uncovered witnesses that had seen Enrique Baquerizo and his associates murder the consul. They were indicted by the Valparaiso Criminal Courts immediately, and their homes were raided in search of the murder weapons. It was revealed during the initial trial session that witnesses had seen Enrique Baquerizo hurl abuse the man earlier that week, hurling insults at him and shoving him and spitting upon him. One witness even claimed to have seen Enrique smash the man's face with a bat, two weeks prior to the murder.

However, three days into the trial, Alfredo Baquerizo arrived after his journey from Ecuador, and appeared in the court as the lawyer for his brother. Due to his family's noble standing and political power, the Judge promptly dismissed the case, and Enrique was acquitted of the terrible crime. The matter made international news in Ecuador and Chile for many weeks.

== Political career ==
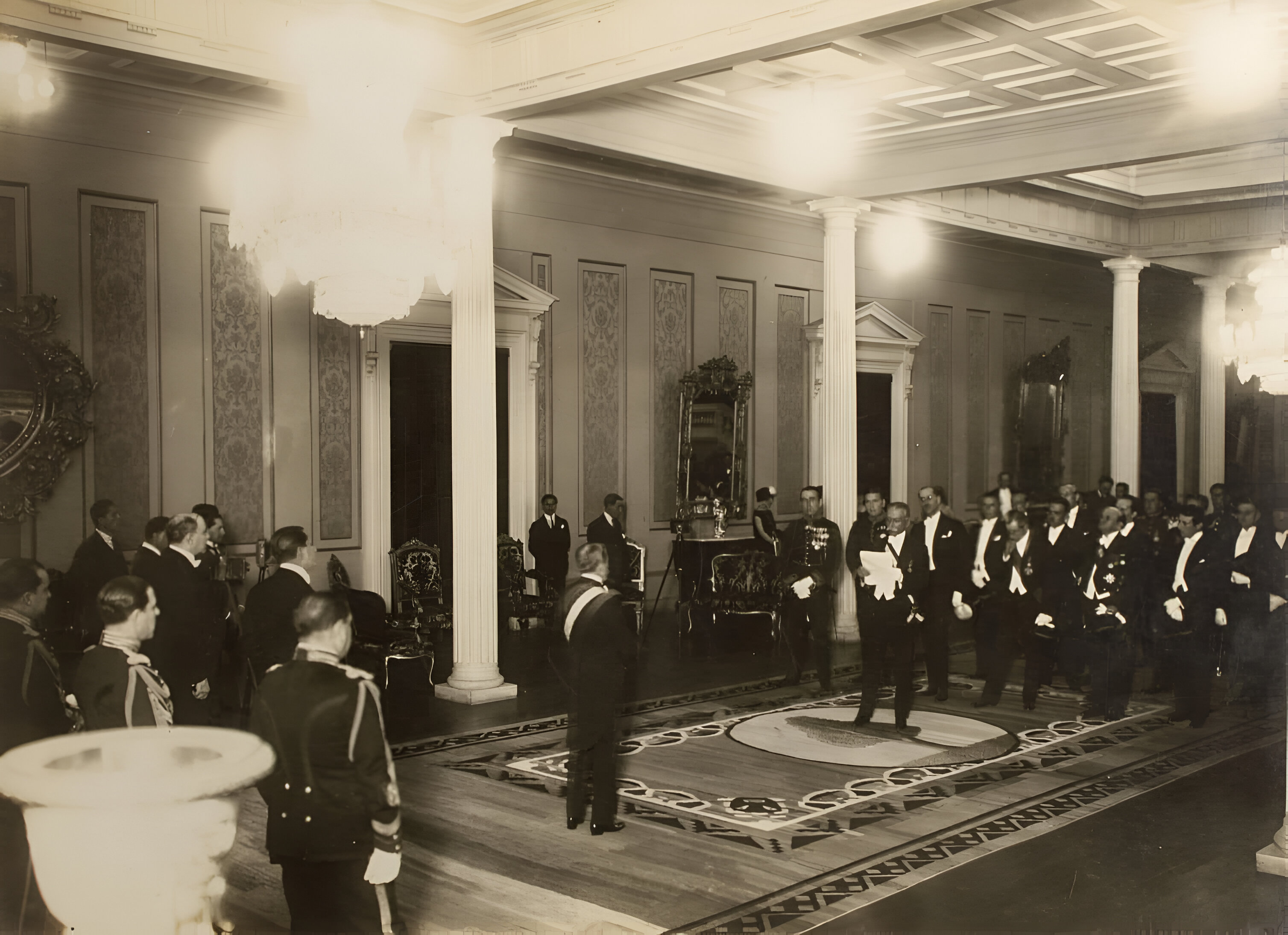
Alfredo Baquerizo Moreno at his Presidential Inauguration, 1916

=== Beginning ===
Baquerizo's career began in 1902, when he was called to Quito to be appointed as Minister of Foreign Affairs. In 1903, Baquerizo was appointed as Minister Plenipotentiary (Chief Diplomat) to Cuba and Colombia, an important position at the time, when international troubles ran rife through the continent, and his position held the authority to end or initiate international conflicts.

The next year Baquerizo was appointed as Vice President of Ecuador, serving a four-year term from 1904 to 1908. One of his roles being the President's spokesperson, a prominent reporter at the time once described Baquerizo as having "a splendid oratory and majestic eloquence that captivated with images and similes and opened and closed the resounding periods of his speeches, which soon became famous throughout the country for their beauty, although they were not philosophical in nature but rather more appropriate for the occasion."

In 1905, newly elected President Lizardo García appointed him as Chief of the advisory board of the Ministry of foreign affairs, however resigned in 1907 and went into hiding for five years after President Eloy Alfaro (whom his brother had tried to assassinate) came into power. In 1912, after the collapse of Alfaro's regime and the successful killing of Alfaro by catholic soldiers, Baquerizo was elected to the Ecuadorian Congress as a Senator, and became the Presiding Officer of the Senate, wielding immense political power. In the later half of 1912, Baquerizo briefly served as President of Ecuador due to the resignation of President General Leonidas Plaza (uncle to Moreno's daughter-in-law.)

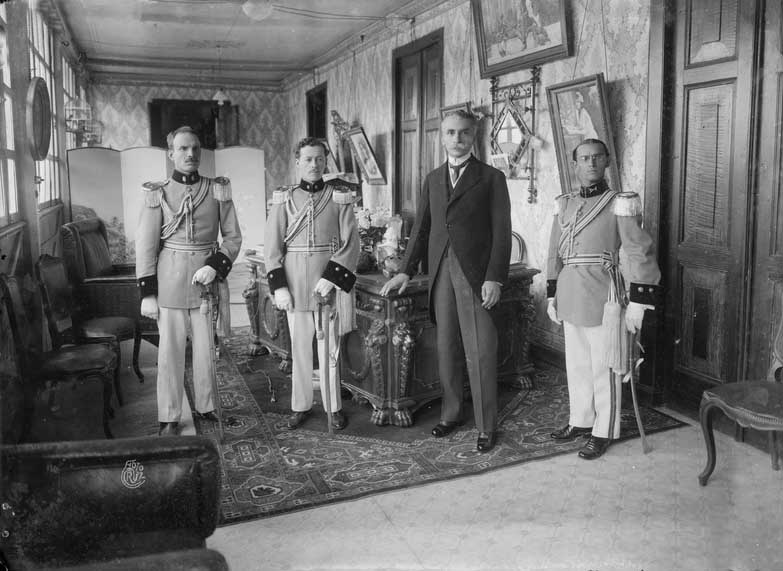
Alfredo Baquerizo Moreno and his aides-de-camp. ca. 1916–1920

=== 19th Presidency of Ecuador ===
In September 1916, Baquerizo was officially elected as President of Ecuador, winning with 94% of the national vote, serving a four-year term until August 1920. He was elected during a time of immense political trouble and instability, with his predecessor's family having been entirely assassinated, however Baquerizo's first decree (executive order) was to declare a broad amnesty for all, restoring internal peace to the country.

In June 1917, Baquerizo sailed on the Presidential Ship "La Patria" to the Galapagos Islands, founding the leading city of Puerto Baquerizo Moreno. In 1918, American billionaire and richest ever businessman, John D. Rockefeller, established the Rockefeller Mission which arrived to eradicate yellow fever from Guayaquil. Rockefeller built a strong personal relationship and rapport with Baquerizo, and worked together to successfully eradicate yellow fever from the entire Guayas Province in 1919.

Baquerizo introduced several labour policies, decreasing the maximum workday to eight hours, and abolishing the practice of Concertaje, which had previously allowed hacienda labourers to be imprisoned for failing to pay their debts. Baquerizo founded new schools, increased the possibilities of popular education, respected absolute freedom of the press, promoted the construction of various railroad branches, facilitated telegraph communications between the coast and the mountains, and provided electric lighting to several towns.

=== Post-19th Presidency ===
In 1924, after the conclusion of his term, Baquerizo was appointed Special Ambassador to Peru and led the Ecuadorian Delegation to the Centennial of the Battle of Ayacucho, which sealed the independence and establishment of the nation of Peru. In early 1925, he served as President of the Commission for the Revision of the Constitution and Laws, before once again being elected as a Senator and presiding over the Ecuadorian National Congress.

=== Emergency Term to Restore Democracy ===
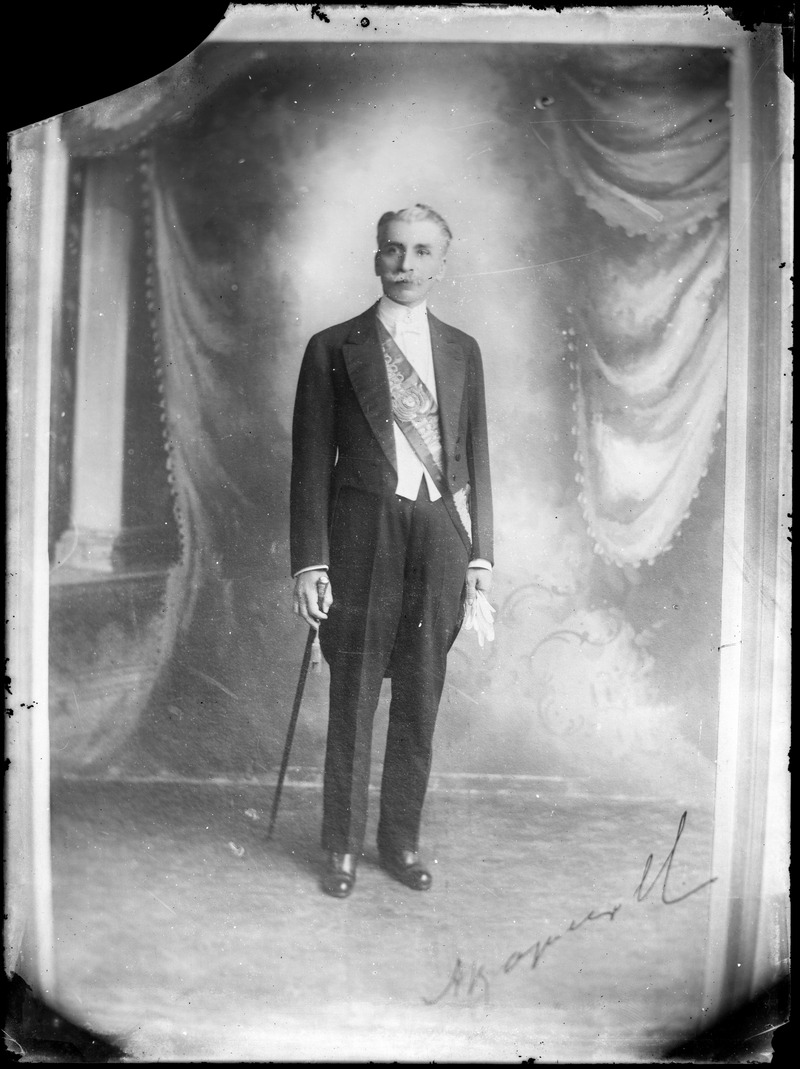
Alfredo Baquerizo - 1916

In 1931, Baquerizo assumed the Presidency following the dramatic fall of the dictatorship of Colonel Luís Larrea Alba. During this one-year tenure, Baquerizo frequently exchanged telegrams with President Herbert Hoover of the United States of America. Wishing to put Ecuador's interests first and maintain the integrity of democracy, Baquerizo put aside his own interests and immediately called for a national election to establish an officially elected president. Neftalí Bonifaz, a right wing conservative won the subsequent election. However, a constitutional issue emerged; Bonifaz was accused of holding Peruvian nationality, as he was born in the Peruvian consulate in Quito, which rendered him ineligible for the presidency under the Ecuadorian Constitution. Congress, dominated by liberals and leftists, moved to invalidate Bonifaz's election.

The streets of cities around Ecuador were rocked with violent protests between right-wing "Bonifazists" that demanded that Bonifaz was granted the Presidency, and left-wingers that demanded Alfredo Baquerizo Moreno not to hand the Presidency to Bonifaz due to the constitutional issue, but instead hand the Presidency to the left-wing candidate from the previous election. However, the Bonifazists began taking up arms and bloody massacres in the streets of Quito and Guayaquil followed, and Baquerizo was forced to hand the Presidency to a close associate of Bonifaz, to halt the progress of a violent civil war that had been brewing in the streets, which had already resulted in the killing of many civilians by the Bonifazists.

Over several weeks prior to the handing over of the Presidency, Baquerizo had conjured up several military plans with his Generals. Upon resigning and handing the Presidency to the associate of Bonifaz, Moreno sought asylum in the Argentinian Embassy, residing in a secured, steel-bolted room with three armed guards surrounding the entrance, whilst the Ecuadorian Military, loyal to Baquerizo, took to the streets and waged a Four-Day War against the Bonifazists, ultimately successfully suppressing the attempted civil war and ending the Bonifaz movement. Baquerizo emerged from hiding and held another peaceful election in which he did not run, resulting in the victory of the liberal candidate Alberto Guerrero Martínez.

== Later Life and Retirement ==
=== Politics and Law ===
Baquerizo retired from public life following his successful winning of the Four-Day War, citing to a close friend that he was content with his achievements made in his numerous positions. Baquerizo too resigned as Chief Attorney to the prominent Marcos family, and as Chief Attorney for the Bank of Ecuador.

=== Retirement ===
In 1939, Baquerizo turned eighty. The Guayaquil Municipality declared him an Illustrious Son of the City and named the northern stretch of Chimborazo Street, starting at the boulevard, after him. In 1940, "Chronicles of the Tribute" appeared, and the Guayaquil Municipality published a 195-page "Selection of Essays" in his honor, containing his notes and speeches.

In 1945, the members of the patriotic institution "Los Comandos," who had just obtained approval of their bylaws in Quito, asked Moreno to write lyrics for a patriotic national anthem, and he wrote "Remember El Oro".

=== Death and legacy ===
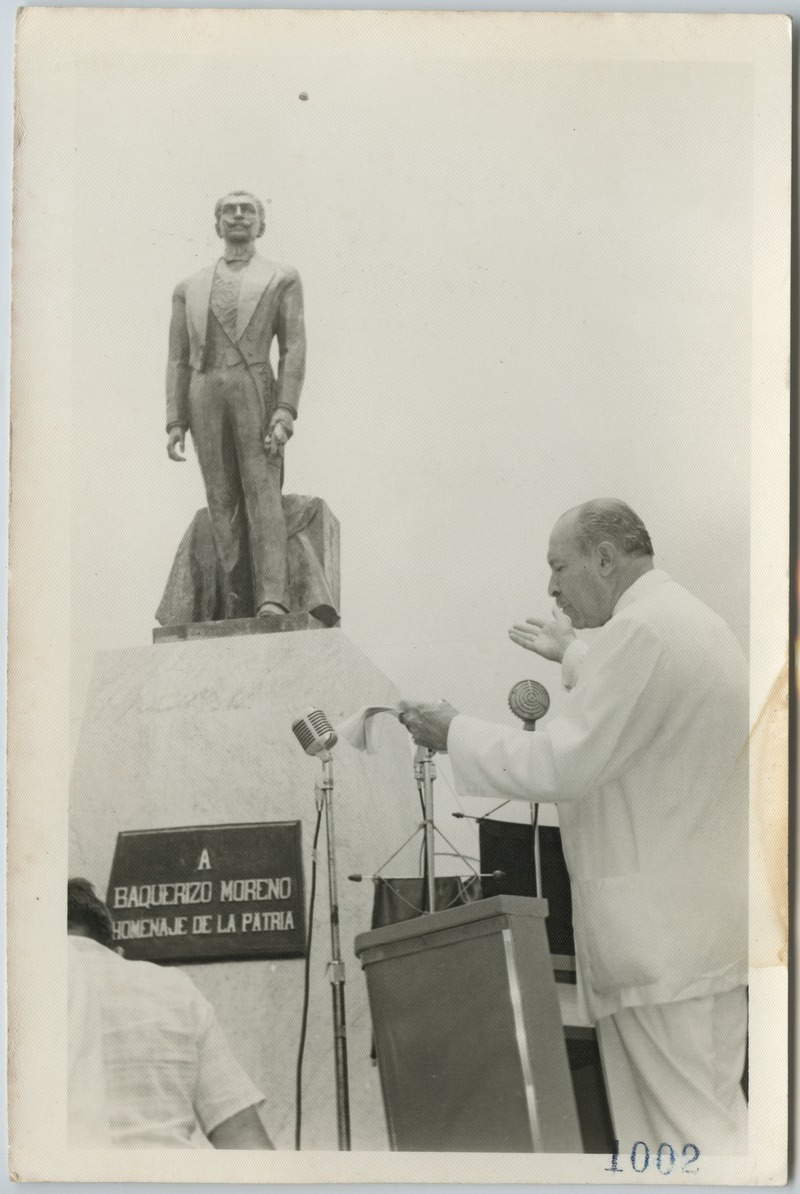
Baquerizo Statue Inauguration, 1950

In 1951, Baquerizo was diagnosed with cancer of the bladder, and was subsequently flown to New York City, United States of America, where he was operated on at the New York Medical Center. On 22 March, after a successful operation, his cancers had been surgically been removed. However, the next morning, an old and unhealed ulcer led him to vomit blood and enter a state of unconsciousness, where he died hours later, surrounded by his children, in peace, without suffering, although without gaining consciousness.

His remains rest in the General Cemetery of Guayaquil, alongside numerous other presidents and Government Officials, a statue of him later being built in Malecon 2000, a memorial garden in Guayaquil.

There are over 36 statutes of Alfredo Baquerizo Moreno throughout the nation, as well as 472 streets, institutes, towns, municipalities, buildings and cities dedicated to him.

Political offices
Preceded by Carlos Freire Zaldumbide	Vice President of Ecuador; 1903–1906	Succeeded by Position abolished
Preceded by Francisco Andrade Marín	President of Ecuador; 1912	Succeeded by Leónidas Plaza
Preceded by Leónidas Plaza	President of Ecuador; 1916–1920	Succeeded by José Luis Tamayo
Preceded by Luis Larrea Alba	President of Ecuador; 1931–1932	Succeeded by Carlos Freile Larrea
