= José Luis Tamayo =

President of Ecuador (1920–1924)

José Luis Tamayo Terán
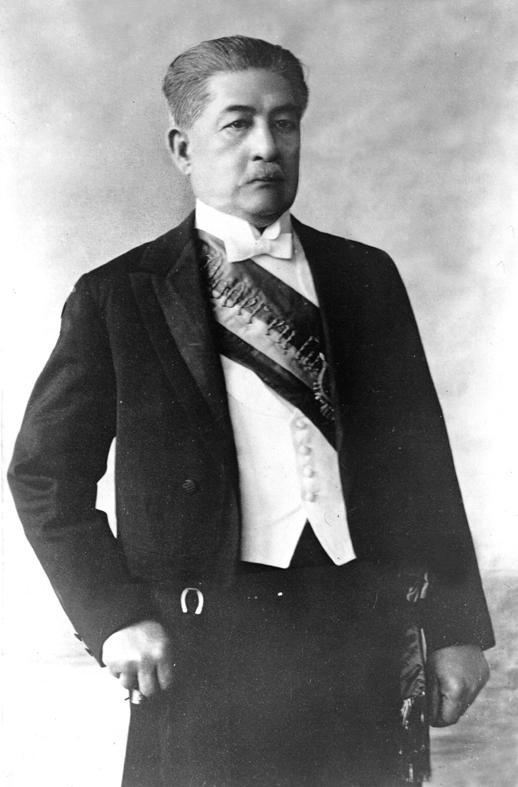

20th President of Ecuador
- In office 1 September 1920 – 31 August 1924
- Preceded by: Alfredo Baquerizo
- Succeeded by: Gonzalo Córdova

Personal details
- Born: 29 July 1858 Chanduy, Guayas, Ecuador
- Died: 7 July 1947 (aged 88) Guayaquil, Guayas, Ecuador
- Party: Radical Liberal
- Spouse: Esther Concha Torres (m. 1897)

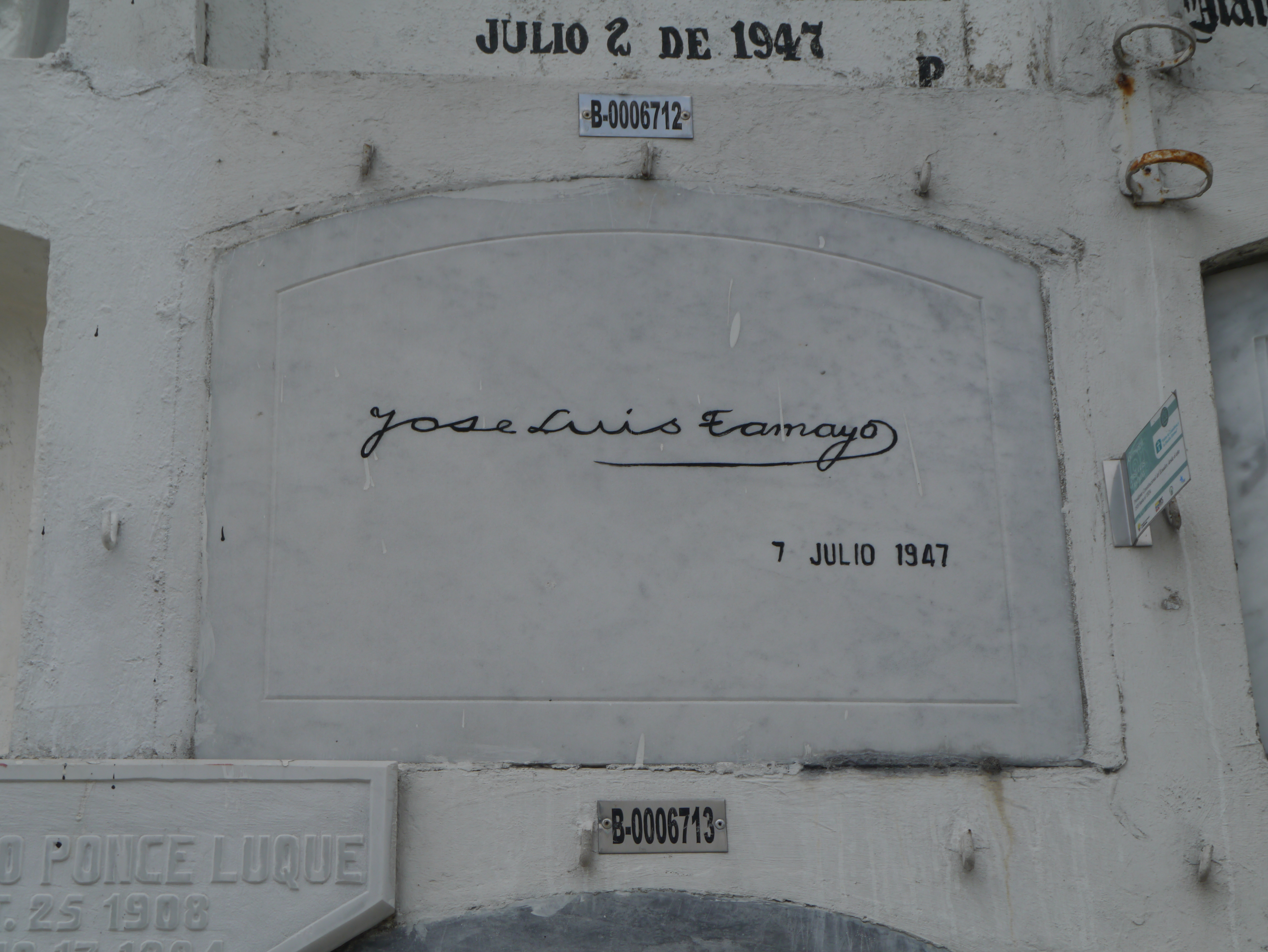

José Luis Tamayo Terán (29 July 1858 – 7 July 1947) was President of Ecuador from 1 September 1920 to 31 August 1924. He was a member of the Ecuadorian Radical Liberal Party. He was Presidents of the Chamber of Deputies in 1898, and President of the Senate in 1905. He was the last Ecuadoran President to complete a full term in office until Galo Plaza Lasso did, so nearly a quarter-century later.

Among Tamayo's actions in office was to promulgate Ecuador's first regulations regarding the oil industry, although the law had little practical effect. He was also active in establishing vice taxes in order to fund programs to arrest the spread of venereal disease among the prostitutes of Quito. In addition, an Act of September 1921 introduced the right of workers to compensation for occupational diseases and industrial accidents.

Political offices
Preceded by Alfredo Baquerizo	President of Ecuador; 1920–1924	Succeeded by Gonzalo Córdova
