= First ladies and gentlemen of Ecuador =

Spouse of the President of Ecuador

First Ladies and Gentlemen of Ecuador

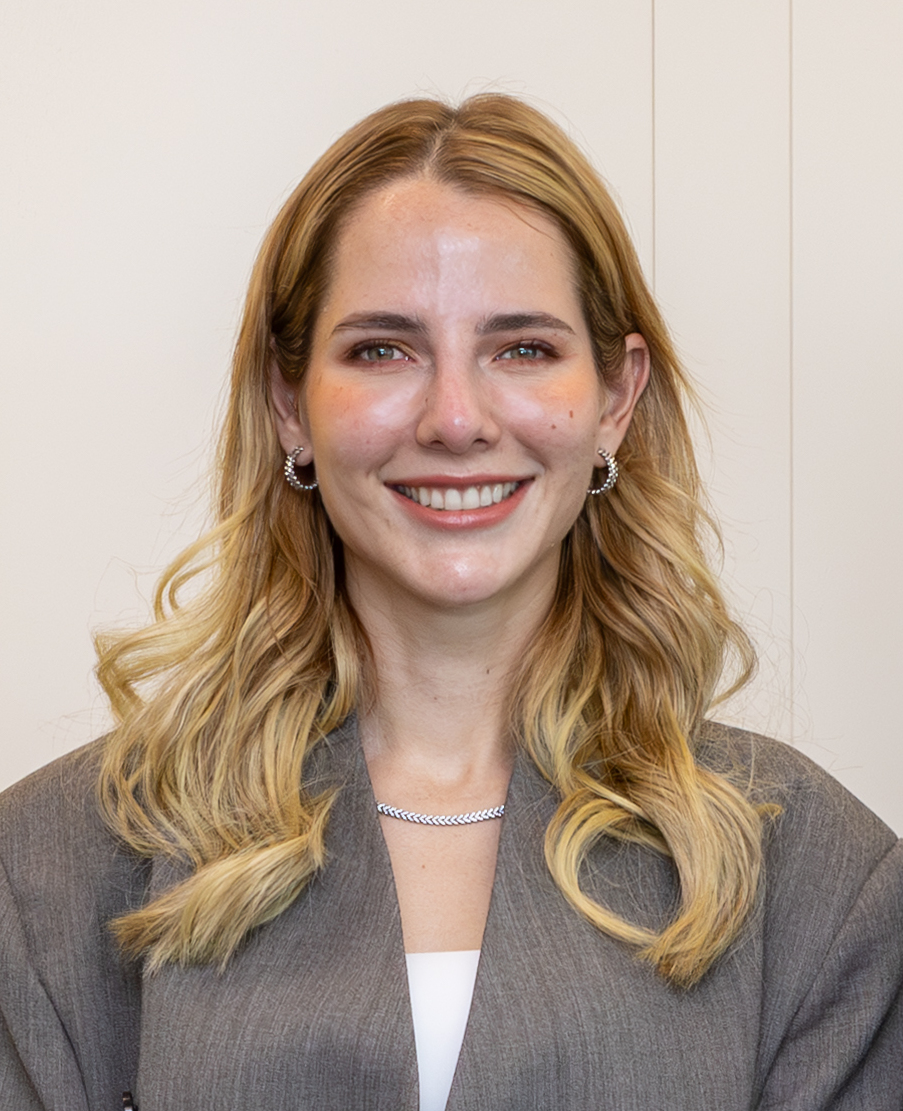
- Incumbent; Lavinia Valbonesi since 23 November 2023
- Residence: Carondelet Palace
- Inaugural holder: Mercedes Jijón
- Formation: 22 September 1830

First ladies and gentlemen of Ecuador are the wives and husbands of the presidents of Ecuador. There has been only one first gentleman of Ecuador to date, Pedro Fernández de Córdova Álvarez, the husband of former acting president Rosalía Arteaga Serrano.

== List of first ladies and gentlemen of Ecuador ==
Type of government:

Constitutional
Interim
By Fact

Nº	Picture	Name	President	Term in office
Holders of the title "Wife of the President"
1º		Mercedes Jijón	Juan José Flores	1830–1834
2º		Baltazara Calderón de Rocafuerte	Vicente Rocafuerte y Bejarano	1835–1839
(1º)		Mercedes Jijón	Juan José Flores	1839–1845
		María Rosa Icaza	José Joaquín de Olmedo (Head of the Provisional Government)	1845–1845
3º		Juana Andrade Fuente Fría	Vicente Ramón Roca	1845–1849
		Carmen Salinas de la Vega	Manuel de Ascazubi y Matheu (Vice-president, in charge of the Government)	1849–1850
4º		Tomasa Carbo y Noboa	Diego Noboa	1850–1851
5º		Teresa Jado	José María Urvina y Viteri	1851–1856
6º		Carmen de Santistevan y Avilés	Francisco Robles Garcia	1856–1859
7º		Rosa Ascázubi y Matheu	Gabriel García Moreno	1859–1865
		Widower	Rafael Carvajal (Vice-president, in charge of the Government)	1865–1865
8º		María Antonia Andrade	Jeronimo Carrion y Palacio	1865–1867
		Juana Arteta y Garzon	Pedro José de Arteta (Vice-president, in charge of the Government)	1867–1868
		Single	Javier Espinosa y Espinosa	1868–1869
		Mariana del Alcázar y Ascasubi	Gabriel García Moreno (Interim President)	1869–1869
		Carmen Salinas de la Vega	Manuel de Ascásubi y Matheu (Interim constitutional President)	1869–1869
9º		Mariana del Alcazar y Ascasubi	Gabriel García Moreno	1869–1875
			Francisco Xavier León y Franco (Vice-president, in charge of the Government)	1875–1875
		Isabel Valdivieso y Carcelén de Guevara	José Javier Eguiguren (Min. of Finance, in charge of the Government)	1875–1875
10º		Rosa Lucía Moscoso Cardenas	Antonio Borrero y Cortázar	1875–1876
11º		Marieta de Veintemilla	Ignacio de Veintemilla y Villacis	1876–1883
		Jesús Dávila Heredia	Luis Cordero Crespo (1st President of the Pentavirato)	1883
		Antonia Chiriboga y Muñoz	Rafael Pérez Pareja (2nd President of the Pentavirato)	1883
12º		Pastoriza Marquez de la Plata y Plaza	José María Plácido Caamaño	1883–1888
		Leticia Escobar y Salvador	Pedro José Cevallos (Vice-president, in charge of the Government)	1895–1895
13º		Leonor Ruiz de Apodaca	Antonio Flores Jijón	1888–1892
		Widower (Jesús Davila Heredia)	Luis Cordero Crespo	1892–1895
		Manuela Quiñones Perez	Vicente Lucio Salazar (Vice-president, in charge of the Government)	1895–1895
14º		Ana Paredes Arosemena	Eloy Alfaro Delgado	1895–1901
15º		Avelina Lasso	Leónidas Plaza y Gutiérrez	1901–1905
16º		Carmen Coello Alvarez	Lizardo García Sorroza	1905–1906
(14º)		Ana Paredes Arosemena	Eloy Alfaro Delgado	1906–1911
		Rosa Elena Larrea y Gomez de la Torre	Carlos Freile Zaldumbide (President of the Senate, in charge of the Government)	1911–1911
17º		Lastenia Gamarra Menéndez	Emilio Estrada Carmona	1911
		Rosa Elena Larrea y Gomez de la Torre	Carlos Freile Zaldumbide (President of the Senate, in charge of the Government)	1911–1912
		Victoria Malo German	Francisco Andrade Marín (President of the Congress, in charge of the Government)	1912–1912
		Piedad Roca Marcos	Alfredo Baquerizo Moreno (President of the Senate, in charge of the Government)	1912–1912
(15º)		Avelina Lasso	Leónidas Plaza y Gutiérrez	1912–1916
18º		Piedad Roca Marcos	Alfredo Baquerizo Moreno	1916–1920
19º		Esther Concha Torres	José Luis Tamayo	1920–1924
20º		Victoria Monsalve Cardenas	Gonzalo Córdova y Rivera	1924–1925
		Does not exist	Provisional Government	1925–1926
21º		Laura Carbo Núñez	Isidro Ayora Cueva	1926–1931
		Lucy Lopez y Williams	Luis Larrea Alba (Secretary of State, in charge of the Government)	1931–1931
		Piedad Roca Marcos	Alfredo Baquerizo Moreno (President of the Senate, in charge of the Government)	1931–1932
		Manuela Gomez de la Torre y Nájera	Carlos Freile Larrea (Secretary of State, in charge of the Government)	1932–1932
		Maria Elena Valenzuela y Plaza	Alberto Guerrero Martínez (President of the Senate, in charge of the Government)	1932–1932
22º		Francisca Torres Lascano	Juan de Dios Martínez Mera	1932–1933
			Abelardo Montalvo (President of the Senate, in charge of the Government)	1933–1934
23º		Esther Silva Burbano	José María Velasco Ibarra	1934–1935
		Single	Antonio Pons (Secretary of State, in charge of the Government)	1935–1935
		Adelina Espinosa García	Federico Páez (Interim President)	1935–1937
		Mariana Calderón Alava	Alberto Enríquez Gallo (Supreme Chief)	1937–1938
		Ana Maria Bustamante	Manuel María Borrero (Interim President)	1938
24º		Judith Perez Davalos	Aurelio Mosquera Narváez	1938–1939
		Elena Yerovi Matheu	Carlos Arroyo del Río (President of the Senate, in charge of the Government)	1939
		Rosario Galarza Arizaga	Andres Fernandez de Cordova (President of the Congress, in charge of the Government)	1939–1940
			Julio Enrique Moreno (President of the Senate, in charge of the Government)	1940
25º		Elena Yerovi Matheu	Carlos Arroyo del Río	1940–1944
		Does not exist	Provisional Government	1944

== First ladies and gentlemen of Ecuador ==
Type of Government:

Constitutional
Interim
By Fact

Nº	Image	Name	President	Term in office
Holders of the title "First Lady of Ecuador"
26º		Corina del Parral	José María Velasco Ibarra	1944–1947
			Carlos Mancheno Cajas (Min. of Defense, Presidente by Fact)	1947
27º		Blanca Pasquel Alarcón	Mariano Suárez Veintimilla	1947
28º		Laura Monroy Garaycoa	Carlos Julio Arosemena Tola	1947–1948
29º		Rosario Pallares Zaldumbide	Galo Plaza Lasso	1948–1952
(26º)		Corina del Parral	José María Velasco Ibarra	1952–1956
30º		Dolores Gangotena	Camilo Ponce Enríquez	1956–1960
(26º)		Corina del Parral	José María Velasco Ibarra	1960–1961
31º		Gladys Peet	Carlos Julio Arosemena Monroy	1961–1963
		Piedad Gabela Reyes	Ramón Castro Jijón (President of the Military Government)	1963–1966
		Victoria Mercedes Gomez Icaza	Clemente Yerovi Indaburu (Interim President)	1966
32º		Lucila Santos Trujillo	Otto Arosemena Gomez	1966–1968
(26º)		Corina del Parral	José María Velasco Ibarra	1968–1972
		Aida Judith Leon	Guillermo Rodríguez Lara (President by Fact)	1972–1976
		Alicia Pizzimbono	Alfredo Poveda (President by Fact)	1976–1979
33º		Martha Bucaram Ortiz	Jaime Roldós Aguilera	1979–1981
34º		Margarita Pérez Pallares	Osvaldo Hurtado Larrea	1981–1984
35º		María Eugenia Cordovez Pontón	León Febres-Cordero Ribadeneyra	1984–1988
36º		Carmen Calisto	Rodrigo Borja Cevallos	1988–1992
37º		Josefina Villalobos	Sixto Durán Ballén	1992–1996
38º		María Rosa Pulley Vergara	Abdalá Bucaram Ortiz	1996–1997
		Pedro Fernández de Cordova	Rosalía Arteaga Serrano (Vice-president, in charge of the Government)	1997–1997
		Lucia Peña Ochoa	Fabián Alarcón Rivera (Interim President)	1997–1998
39º		Paola Mahuad Calderón	Jamil Mahuad Witt	1998–2000
40º		Maria Isabel Baquerizo	Gustavo Noboa Bejarano	2000–2003
41º		Ximena Bohórquez	Lucio Gutiérrez Borbua	2003–2005
42º		María Beatriz Paret	Alfredo Palacio González	2005–2007
43º		Anne Malherbe Gosselin	Rafael Correa Delgado	2007–2017
44º		Rocío González Navas	Lenín Moreno Garcés	2017–2021
45º		María de Lourdes Alcívar	Guillermo Lasso Mendoza	2021–2023
46º		Lavinia Valbonesi	Daniel Noboa Azin	2023–present
