= List of governors of Guayas =

The Governor of the Guayas is the representative authority in the Province of Guayas of the President of Ecuador. The governor coordinates and controls the policies of the national government and directs the activities of the employees and representatives of the executive branch in the province. The position has been occupied by Zaida Rovira since February 13, 2025.

== History ==
Tomás Cipriano de Mosquera y Arboleda was the first governor of Guayas, appointed by the first president of Ecuador Juan José Flores, in the year 1830.

Between 1963-1966 and 1972-1976, the responsibilities of the governor of Guayas were occupied by the military.

This position was also occupied by notable people such as: José Joaquín de Olmedo (1830-31/39), Vicente Ramón Roca (1832/34-36/37-38), Vicente Rocafuerte (1834/39-43), Gabriel García Moreno (1847–48), Francisco Robles (1853-1856), Ignacio de Veintemilla (1875-1876), José María Plácido Caamaño (1876-1878/92-94), Emilio Estrada (1906–11), Gustavo Noboa (1983–84), Jaime Nebot (1984–88) and Guillermo Lasso (1988-99).

== Governors of Guayas ==
=== 1830-1900 ===
Governor	Term		Appointed by	Ref.
Governor	Start	End	Appointed by	Ref.
Tomás Cipriano de Mosquera y Arboleda	1830	1830	Juan José Flores	
Juan Ignacio de Pareja y Arteta	1830	1830	Juan José Flores	
José Joaquín de Olmedo y Maruri	1830	1831	Juan José Flores	
Vicente Ramón Roca Rodríguez	1832	1833	Juan José Flores	
León de Febres Cordero y Oberto	1833	1833	Juan José Flores	
Pedro Santander y Peña	1833	1833	Juan José Flores	
José María Caamaño y Arteta	1833	1834	Juan José Flores	
Vicente Rocafuerte y Rodríguez de Bejarano	1834	1834	Juan José Flores	
Vicente Ramón Roca Rodríguez	1834	1836	Vicente Rocafuerte	
Francisco de Paula de Icaza y Silva	1836	1836	Vicente Rocafuerte	
Vicente González y Rodríguez	1836	1837	Vicente Rocafuerte	
Francisco de Paula de Icaza y Silva	1837	1837	Vicente Rocafuerte	
Vicente Ramón Roca Rodríguez	1837	1838	Vicente Rocafuerte	
Ángel de Tola y Salcedo	1838	1839	Vicente Rocafuerte	
José Joaquín de Olmedo y Maruri	1839	1839	Vicente Rocafuerte	
Vicente Rocafuerte y Rodríguez de Bejarano	1839	1843	Juan José Flores	
José García Moreno	1844	1845	Juan José Flores	
Francisco de Paula de Icaza y Silva	1845	1846	Gobierno Provisorio	
Gabriel García Moreno	1847	1848	Vicente Ramón Roca	
Francisco de Paula de Icaza y Silva	1849	1850	Manuel de Ascázubi	
Antonio Elizalde Lamar	1850	1853	Diego Noboa	.
Juan Francisco Robles y García	1853	1856	José María Urbina	.
José Antonio Gómez Iturralde	1856	1857	Francisco Robles	.
Juan Francisco Boloña Mármol	1858	1859	Francisco Robles	.
Teodoro Maldonado Cora	1859	1859	Francisco Robles	.
José Antonio Gómez Iturralde	1859	1862	Gabriel García Moreno	
Vicente Piedrahíta Carbo	1862	1865	Gabriel García Moreno	
Miguel García Moreno	1865	1869	Jerónimo Carrión	.
Vicente de Santistevan y Rocafuerte	1869	1875	Gabriel García Moreno	.
Ignacio de Veintemilla Villacís	1875	1876	Antonio Borrero Cortázar	.
José María Plácido Caamaño y Gómez Cornejo	1876	1878	Ignacio de Veintemilla	
José Sánchez Rubio	1878	1883	Ignacio de Veintemilla	
José Antonio Gómez Iturralde	1883	1884	José María Plácido Caamaño	
Modesto Jaramillo Egas	1884	1888	José María Plácido Caamaño	
Francisco Campos Coello	1888	1891	Antonio Flores Jijón	
Francisco García Avilés	1891	1892	Antonio Flores Jijón	
José María Plácido Caamaño y Gómez Cornejo	1892	1894	Luis Cordero Crespo	
Francisco Javier Gálvez Montes	1894	1895	Luis Cordero Crespo	
Rafael Pólit Cevallos	1895	1895	Vicente Lucio Salazar	
José María Sáenz del Campo	1895	1896	Eloy Alfaro	
Homero Morla Mendoza	1896	1896	Eloy Alfaro	
Ignacio Robles y Santistevan	1896	1896	Eloy Alfaro	
Felipe V. Carbo Briones	1897	1898	Eloy Alfaro	
Roberto Alfredo Cucalón Marticorena	1899	1900	Eloy Alfaro	

=== 1900-1950 ===
Governor	Term		Appointed by	Ref.
Governor	Start	End	Appointed by	Ref.
Carlos Benjamín Rosales Llaguno	1900	1901	Eloy Alfaro	
Roberto Alfredo Cucalón Marticorena	1901	1901	Eloy Alfaro	
Luis Adriano Dillon Reyna	1901	1902	Leónidas Plaza	
Martín Avilés Elizalde	1903	1904	Leónidas Plaza	
Roberto Alfredo Cucalón Marticorena	1904	1905	Leónidas Plaza	
Federico Galdós Terán	1905	1906	Lizardo García	
Emilio Estrada Carmona	1906	1911	Eloy Alfaro	
Gustavo R. de Ycaza Aguirre	1911	1912	Emilio Estrada	
Carlos Gómez Rendón	1912	1914	Leónidas Plaza	
José Antonio Gómez Valverde	1915	1916	Leónidas Plaza	
Lautaro Aspiazu Cedeño	1916	1918	Alfredo Baquerizo Moreno	
Jorge Pareja Pareja	1918	1923	José Luis Tamayo	
Alberto Gaztelú Concha	1923	1924	José Luis Tamayo	
Alberto Ycaza Carbo	1924	1925	Gonzalo Córdova	
Vicente Paz Ayora	1925	1926	Junta de Gobierno Provisional	
Pedro Pablo Eguez Baquerizo	1926	1927	Isidro Ayora	
José Darío Moral Romero	1927	1929	Isidro Ayora	
Carlos V. Coello Salvador	1929	1932	Isidro Ayora	
Roberto Illingworth Icaza	1932	1933	Juan de Dios Martínez	
Rodolfo Baquerizo Moreno	1933	1934	Abelardo Montalvo	
José María Díaz Granados	1934	1935	José María Velasco Ibarra	
Alberto Ycaza Carbo	1935	1937	Federico Páez Chiriboga	
Carlos Noboa Cooke	1938	1938	Alberto Enríquez Gallo	
Enrique Baquerizo Moreno	1938	1944	Manuel María Borrero	
Pedro Pablo Eguez Baquerizo	1944	1945	José María Velasco Ibarra	
Roberto Nevárez Vásquez	1945	1945	José María Velasco Ibarra	
Santiago Roldós Soria	1945	1946	José María Velasco Ibarra	
Aurelio Carrera Calvo	1946	1947	José María Velasco Ibarra	
Rafael Mendoza Avilés	1947	1947	José María Velasco Ibarra	
Juan Tanca Marengo	1947	1948	Carlos Julio Arosemena Tola	
Adolfo Gómez y Santistevan	1948	1948	Carlos Julio Arosemena Tola	
Clodoveo Alcívar Zevallos	1948	1950	Galo Plaza Lasso	

=== 1950-2000 ===
Governor	Term		Appointed by	Ref.
Governor	Start	End	Appointed by	Ref.
J. Federico Intriago Arrata	1950	1952	Galo Plaza Lasso	
Miguel Alcívar Elzalde	1952	1952	Galo Plaza Lasso	
Eduardo Arosemena Monroy	1952	1952	José María Velasco Ibarra	
Jaime Nebot Velasco	1952	1953	José María Velasco Ibarra	
Julio Hidalgo Martínez	1953	1955	José María Velasco Ibarra	
Héctor Mendoza Rigaíl	1955	1956	José María Velasco Ibarra	
Teodoro Maldonado Carbo	1956	1958	Camilo Ponce Enríquez	
Enrique Baquerizo Valenzuela	1958	1960	Camilo Ponce Enríquez	
Miguel Macias Hurtado	1960	1961	José María Velasco Ibarra	
Gustavo Gross Urrutia	1961	1961	José María Velasco Ibarra	
Carlos Grunauer Toledo	1961	1962	Carlos Julio Arosemena Monroy	
Manuel Díaz Granados Sáenz	1962	1962	Carlos Julio Arosemena Monroy	
Miguel Roca Osorio	1962	1962	Carlos Julio Arosemena Monroy	
Voltaire Paladines Polo	1962	1963	Carlos Julio Arosemena Monroy	
Luis E. Molina Arroyo	1963	1964	Junta Militar de Gobierno (Ramón Castro Jijón)	
Rafael Cevallos Viteri	1964	1964	Junta Militar de Gobierno (Ramón Castro Jijón)	
Marco Vinicio González	1964	1966	Junta Militar de Gobierno (Ramón Castro Jijón)	
Roberto Névarez Vásquez	1966	1966	Clemente Yerovi	
Benjamín Rosales Aspiazu	1966	1967	Otto Arosemena Gómez	
Ernesto Juan Jouvín Cisneros	1967	1968	Otto Arosemena Gómez	
Otto Carbo Avellán	1968	1968	Otto Arosemena Gómez	
Enrique Grau Ruiz	1968	1968	José María Velasco Ibarra	
Pedro Menéndez Gilbert	1968	1971	José María Velasco Ibarra	
Oswaldo Menéndez Gilbert	1971	1972	José María Velasco Ibarra	
Sergio Vásquez Pacheco	1972	1972	Guillermo Rodríguez Lara	
Renán Olmedo González	1972	1975	Guillermo Rodríguez Lara	
Jaime Eduardo Semblantes Polanco	1975	1976	Guillermo Rodríguez Lara	
Alfonso Trujillo Bustamante	1976	1976	Consejo Supremo de Gobierno (Alfredo Poveda)	
Rodolfo Runflo Akel	1976	1976	Consejo Supremo de Gobierno (Alfredo Poveda)	
Héctor Romero Parducci	1976	1978	Consejo Supremo de Gobierno (Alfredo Poveda)	
Jacinto Loayza Matheus	1978	1979	Consejo Supremo de Gobierno (Alfredo Poveda)	
Carlos Hidalgo Villacís	1979	1982	Jaime Roldós Aguilera	
Juan Pablo Moncagatta Fargas	1982	1983	Osvaldo Hurtado Larrea	
Gustavo José Joaquín Noboa Bejarano	March, 1983	August, 1984	Osvaldo Hurtado Larrea	
Jaime José Nebot Saadi	August 10, 1984	August 10, 1988	León Febres-Cordero	
Juana María Vallejo Klaere	August 10, 1988	September 12, 1988	Rodrigo Borja Cevallos	
Rafael Guerrero Valenzuela	1988	1990	Rodrigo Borja Cevallos	
Oswaldo Molestina Zavala	1990	1992	Rodrigo Borja Cevallos	
Ángel Duarte Valverde	1992	1995	Sixto Durán-Ballén	
Antonio Andretta Arizaga	1995	1996	Sixto Durán-Ballén	
Miguel Salem Dibo	1996	1997	Abdalá Bucaram	
Roberto Gómez Mera	1997	1997	Fabián Alarcón	
Rafael Guerrero Valenzuela	1997	February 17, 1998	Fabián Alarcón	
Carlos Estarellas Merino	1998	1998	Jamil Mahuad	
Guido Chiriboga Parra	June 20, 1998	August 10, 1998	Jamil Mahuad	
Guillermo Alberto Santiago Lasso Mendoza	August 10, 1998	August 17, 1999	Jamil Mahuad	
Benjamín Rosales Valenzuela	1999	2000	Jamil Mahuad	

=== 2000 to present ===
Governor	Term		Appointed by	Ref.
Governor	Start	End	Appointed by	Ref.
Joaquín Martínez Amador	September 14, 2000	September 14, 2001	Gustavo Noboa	
Roberto Hanze Salem	September 14, 2001	2003	Gustavo Noboa	
Carlos Ramón Pólit Faggioni	January 16, 2003	October 1, 2003	Lucio Gutiérrez	
Alberto Merchán Lazo	October 1, 2003	2003	Lucio Gutiérrez	
Felipe Mantilla Huerta	December 17, 2003	August 12, 2004	Lucio Gutiérrez	
Efrén Roca Álvarez	September 6, 2004	2005	Lucio Gutiérrez	
Guido Chiriboga Parra	April 22, 2005	August 16, 2006	Alfredo Palacio	
Carlos Ortega Maldonado	2006	2007	Alfredo Palacio	
Juan Camilo Samán Salem	January 16, 2007	May 19, 2008	Rafael Correa	
Leonardo Vicuña Izquierdo	May 19, 2008	October 21, 2008	Rafael Correa	
Francisco Eduardo Jiménez Sánchez	October 21, 2008	August 4, 2009	Rafael Correa	
Roberto Emilio Cuero Medina	August 4, 2009	April 23, 2012	Rafael Correa	
Viviana Patricia Bonilla Salcedo	April 23, 2012	November 21, 2013	Rafael Correa	
Rolando José Panchana Farra	November 21, 2013	May 21, 2015	Rafael Correa	
Julio César Quiñónez Ocampo	May 21, 2015	November 16, 2016	Rafael Correa	
Luis Monge Espinel	November 25, 2016	May 24, 2017	Rafael Correa	
José Francisco Cevallos Villavicencio	May 24, 2017	August 31, 2018	Lenin Moreno	
Juana María Vallejo Klaere	August 31, 2018	December 20, 2018	Lenin Moreno	
Raúl Clemente Ledesma Huerta	January 11, 2019	August 19, 2019	Lenin Moreno	
Pedro Pablo Duart Segale	August 28, 2019	2020	Lenin Moreno	
Luis Esteban Chonillo Breilh	August 6, 2020	May 24, 2021	Lenin Moreno	
José Vicente Taiano Álvarez	May 25, 2021	September 15, 2021	Guillermo Lasso	
Pablo Arosemena Marriott	September 15, 2021	July 5, 2022	Guillermo Lasso	
Lorenzo Calvas Preciado	August 2, 2022	February 9, 2023	Guillermo Lasso	
Francesco Adeodato Tabacchi Rendón	February 9, 2023	November 23, 2023	Guillermo Lasso	
Alberto Molina Flores	December 4, 2023	April 25, 2024	Daniel Noboa	
Vicente Antonio Auad Cevasco	April 25, 2024		Daniel Noboa	
Eliana Belén Molineros Ruiz	6 January 2025	13 February 2025	Daniel Noboa	
Zaida Elizabeth Rovira Jurado	13 February 2025		Daniel Noboa	
