= Club de la Unión (Ecuador) =

Ecuadorian social club

- Formation: 1869
- Type: Private social club
- Headquarters: Guayaquil, Ecuador

Club de la Unión is a historic gentlemen's club (private social club) in Guayaquil, Ecuador, founded in 1869. It is one of the city's oldest social institutions and has played a significant role in the cultural and civic life of Guayaquil. The club has been a gathering place for political leaders, business elites, and cultural figures, and its former headquarters on the Malecón Simón Bolívar is considered an emblem of the city's architectural and social heritage. To this day members can only be men.

== History ==
The Club de la Unión was established in 1869 in Guayaquil as a social and cultural association that brought together leading figures in the city's political, economic, and social life. The founding president was Carlos Stagg Flores railroad tycoon and grandson of Ecuadorian founding father and first president Juan Jose Flores Early accounts suggest that the club's founding followed the fusion of earlier local clubs in the nineteenth century, after which it became a central meeting place for the city's elite.

The club's history has been documented in a published monograph spanning the period from 1869 to 2011. For much of the twentieth century, the club became a prominent site for the elite's social events and civic gatherings.

== Activities and role ==
Throughout its history, the Club de la Unión served as a center of social interaction for Guayaquil's professional, political, and business communities. Its membership has included politicians, diplomats, intellectuals, and entrepreneurs. The club's facilities have hosted cultural events, social gatherings, business meetings, and community functions.

== Buildings and locations ==
1940's Building

The club's longtime headquarters stood on the Malecón Simón Bolívar adjacent to Avenida Olmedo, overlooking the Guayas River. The structure functioned as a landmark for decades. The historic Club de la Unión building in Guayaquil was constructed between 1939 and 1944 by engineer José Antonio Gómez Gault and became one of the city's most emblematic social landmarks, occupying the prominent corner of Malecón Simón Bolívar and Avenida Olmedo for more than eight decades.

Architecturally it is a 20th-century modernist style, breaking with older classicist style of the riverfront. Its facade and interior include numerous grand salons, terraces, library, grand hall, and numerous meeting rooms.

Samborondon Building 2020's

In the 2020s, the building was expropriated by the Municipality of Guayaquil and converted into a public cultural venue known as the Centro Cultural Olmedo. Thus a new property was acquired by the club in Km 5 Via Samborondón where Guayaquil's elite have been practicing Gentrification for over 20 years. The new building is built by Antonio Plaza and is 7000 sq meters (75,347 sq ft) in construction on a 20,000 sq meter lot (215,278 sq ft) Architecturally, it reflects a contemporary design with classical influences, combining clean volumetric forms and modern materials with traditional club elements such as parquet floors, an English bar, and a grand central staircase in white marble, polished stainless steel, and dark wood paneling. Expansive terraces overlook the Babahoyo River, while the interiors include a gym, spa, private lounges, event halls, library, business center, and an independent rooftop. It has a large art collection and murals.

== Notable Members ==
-Carlos Alberto Arroyo del Río, President of Ecuador

-Otto Arosemena Gómez, President of Ecuador

-Leon Febres Cordero, President of Ecuador

-Gustavo Noboa Baquerizo, President of Ecuador

-Guillermo Lasso Mendoza, President of Ecuador

-Enrique Baquerizo Moreno, Governor of Guayas, Senator, Army Coronel, Fire Chief during Guayaquil's “great fire”, Chief of Police 1913–1916.

-Alfredo Baquerizo Moreno, President of Ecuador

== Legacy ==
The Club de la Unión is considered one of the oldest and most enduring social institutions in Guayaquil, alongside the Benemérito Cuerpo de Bomberos de Guayaquil and the Sociedad Filantrópica del Guayas. Over more than 150 years, it has contributed to the city's civic and cultural development. Travel literature has described it as a landmark reflecting Guayaquil's social heritage.
