= Jijón =

Jijón may refer to:

== People ==
- Antonio Flores Jijón (1833–1915), Ecuadorian president from 1888 to 1892
- Inés Jijón (1909–1995), Ecuadorian pianist and composer
- Jacinto Jijón y Caamaño (1890–1950), Ecuadorian mayor, historian, and archeologist
- Mercedes Jijón (1811–1878), First Lady of Ecuador from 1830 to 1834 and 1839 to 1845
- Ramón Castro Jijón (1915–1984), Ecuadorian president from 1963 to 1966
- Manuel de Larrea y Jijón (1772–18??), Spanish nobleman

== Other uses ==
- Count of the House of Jijón, Spanish noble title since 1782
- Museo Jacinto Jijón y Caamaño, archeological and art museum in Quito, Ecuador

== See also ==
- Jijona
