= Pacífico Chiriboga =

Ecuadorian politician (1810–1886)

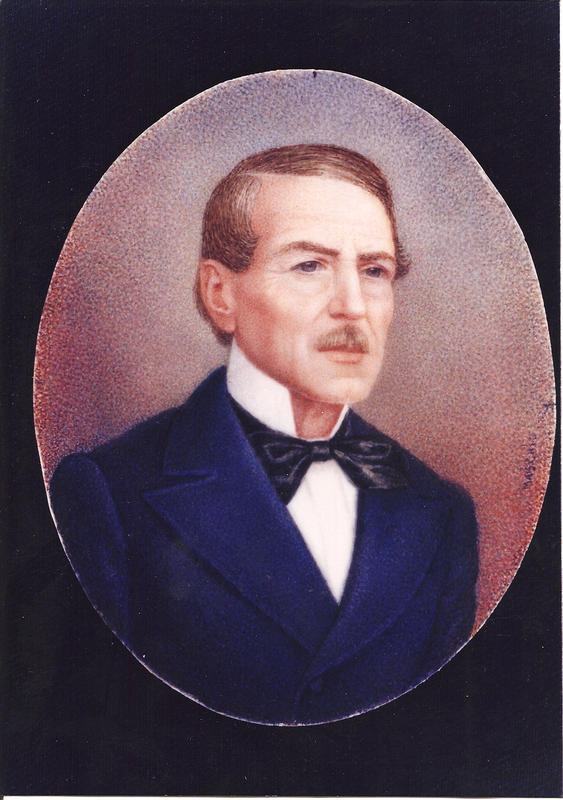
Don Pacifico Chiriboga y Borja

Pacífico Chiriboga y Borja (1810–1886) was an active politician during the first years of the Republic of Ecuador. He served as senator, minister, vice president, and acting president during these formative years.

== Early life ==
Pacífico Chiriboga was born in 1810, on the family estate in Riobamba, in what is now Chimborazo Province. He was the son of Don Martin Chiriboga y Leon, the last royalist corregidor of Riobamba. After the defeat of the Spanish forces, his father was exiled but died in the boat before they landed in Jamaica. His father's devotion to the crown did not affect the young Pacífico's rise in the new Republic. The family land that had been confiscated during the revolution was restored and Pacífico Chiriboga was involved early in the publication of the El Quiteño Libre, a political periodical of great importance at the birth of the Ecuadorian nation. There, he worked with some of the most important intellectuals of his time, including Don Pedro Moncayo, Colonel Francisco Hall, Manuel de Ascásubi y Matheu and his brother Roberto de Ascasubi. His restored fortune and group of friends led to a very prolific public life.

== Political career ==
When President Juan José Flores left office in 1835, Pacífico was elected to the Quito city council. He was then named Governor of Manabi and Pichincha in the 1840s. On August 30, 1852, he was elected vice president with President José María Urvina, and was left in charge of the Executive branch for a total of 100 days in different periods between 1852 and 1854. Pacífico was also vice-president from 1858 to 1860, and later was part of the triumvirate in power with Gabriel García Moreno and Jerónimo Carrión, both early presidents. He was also part of a second triumvirate. He also served as senator, Diputado (i.e. Congressman), minister of state and mayor of the city of San Francisco de Quito. As was the case with most politicians of the time, even when he was involved in government, he was involved in the maintenance and expansion of the family land holdings. He often used his own money to finance his political allies. At one point, he sent 4,000 heads of cattle to feed the troops of Dr. Garcia Moreno, during the wars between the Liberals and Conservatives. He also bought many properties within the city (Quito) limits, which he seems to have used for his political meetings.

== Family ==
Don Pacífico married and had ten children. He died in 1886 in his "main" Quito house after experiencing first-hand the birth of the new Republic.

Political offices
Preceded by Position abolished	Vice President of Ecuador; 1852–1854	Succeeded by Manuel Bustamante
