= Abdón Calderón Garaycoa =

Ecuadorian revolutionary (1804–1822)

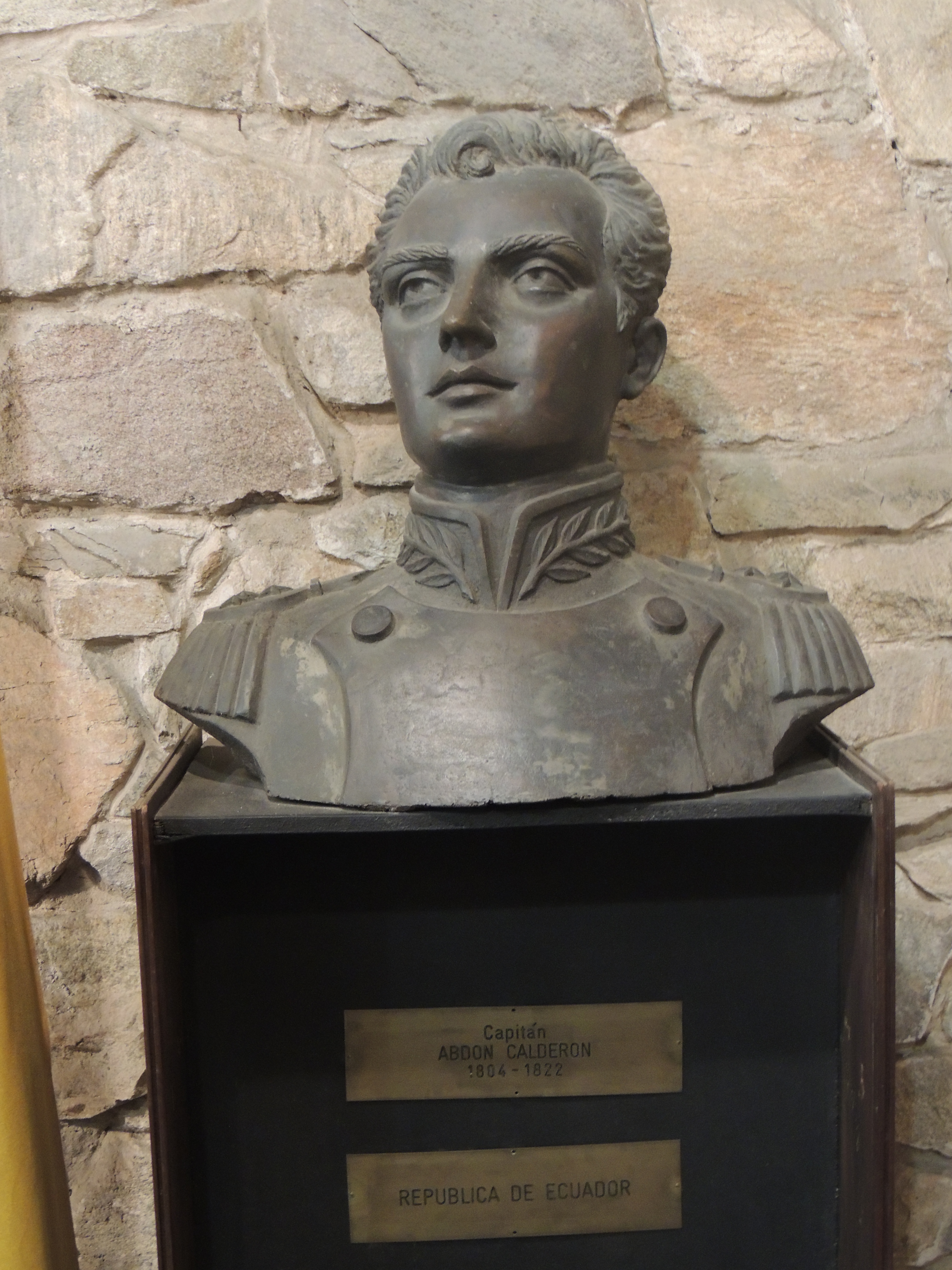
- Born: July 31, 1804; Cuenca, Spanish Empire (now Ecuador)
- Died: June 7, 1822 (aged 17); Quito, Ecuador
- Other name: El héroe niño
- Mother: Manuela de Jesús de Garaycoa y Llaguno

Abdón Calderón Garaycoa (31 July 1804, Cuenca - 7 June 1822, Quito) was a participant in Ecuador's war of independence. He died at age 17 from wounds sustained at the Battle of Pichincha. Such was his heroism that Simón Bolívar not only promoted him post-mortem but also decreed that in the future the first company of the Yaguachi battalion be reviewed as if he were alive, an honor rarely seen in military history.

== Early life ==
Baptized in Cuenca on July 31, 1804, he was the son of Francisco Calderón y Díaz, born in Cuba, who was an accountant of the Cajas Reales, an official of the colonial government in Cuenca, and also a martyr of independence, and of Manuela de Jesús de Garaycoa y Llaguno, from Guayaquil, who belonged to one of the most prominent families of the port.

His father, Francisco Calderón, supported the patriot coup in Quito on August 10, 1809, for which he was imprisoned and sent to Guayaquil and then to Cuenca and Machala. Released when he was established by the Superior Government Junta of 1810, he joined the patriot army of the State of Quito with the rank of colonel. As such, he participated in the entire campaign from 1811 to 1812, fighting on the side of the Sanchistas or radicals. After the final defeat of the patriot army, after the Battle of El Panecillo He was executed by firing squad in Ibarra on December 1, 1812, by order of Sámano. His last wish was that the blindfold be removed and his son Abdón be given his scapular, which was the property of the great hero of Quito Eugenio Espejo. All this experience would profoundly mark the life and death of his son.

Calderón Garaycoa studied in Guayaquil. One of his teachers was Vicente Rocafuerte, who in 1842 went on to marry Baltazara Calderón, Abdón's younger sister.

== Military action ==
Calderón Garaycoa was just 16 years old when the revolution broke out on October 9, 1820, with the declared independence of Guayaquil. José Joaquín de Olmedo then created an army called the Protective Division of Quito in order to also make the rest of the Audiencia independent. That same day, Abdón enlisted in the division where he reached the rank of second lieutenant in the Volunteer Battalion of the Homeland under the orders of Don Ignacio Salazar. He was immediately noted for his "heroic courage", in the words of the patriot colonel Luis Urdaneta, who asked Abdón for the rank of lieutenant after the triumph of Camino Real (November 9, 1820). With this military rank he took part in the various actions of the liberation campaign of 1820-1822: the first defeat of Huachi, that of Tanizagua, the victory of Cone, the second defeat of Huachi, the advance from Guayaquil to Cuenca and from Cuenca to Quito. By the time he fought in the Battle of Pichincha, Abdón Calderón, despite his youth, was a veteran of the war.

== The Battle of Pichincha ==
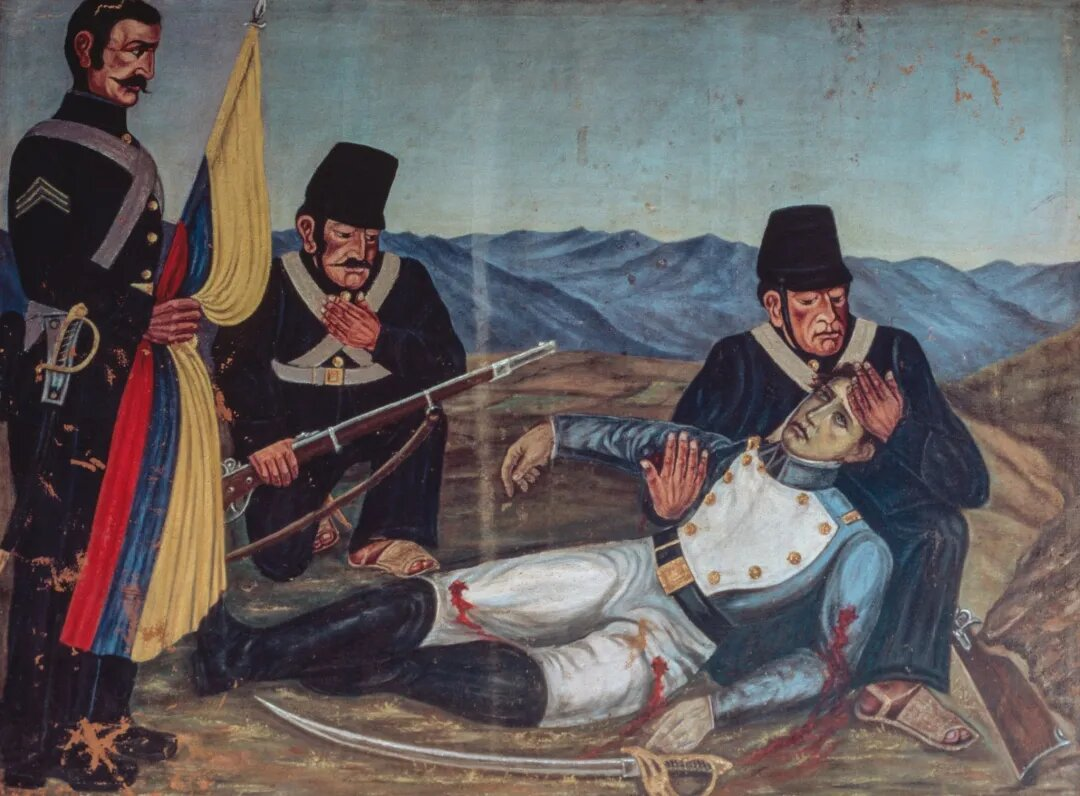
Death of Abdón Calderón in an Anonymous Painting.

A more realistic version of events is that Abdón Calderón, despite having received four gunshot wounds, remained in the line of fire, encouraging his entire battalion, which he commanded as a lieutenant. When he fell, fainting, his soldiers improvised a stretcher with a poncho and put him in a hut located in the arena. At the end of the battle he was transferred into the city of Quito, where he died fourteen days later of dysentery in the San Juan de Dios hospital on June 7, 1822. Antonio José de Sucre In his brief report of the Battle of Pichincha, dated May 28 of that year, he says:

"I make a particular mention of the conduct of Lieutenant Calderon, who, having received four successive wounds, did not want to retire from combat. He will probably die, but the Government of the Republic will know how to compensate the family for the services of this heroic officer."

== Legacy ==
=== Posthumous promotion ===
When Simón Bolívar arrived at Quito, he posthumously promoted Calderón to the rank of captain and decreed that his salary be given to his mother. He ordered that the first company of the Yaguachi Battalion to which Calderón belonged would not have a captain and in the magazines, when his name was mentioned, the troops would have to answer: "He died gloriously in Pichincha, but he lives in our hearts." This ceremony is performed to this day in this military unit. it is staged every May 24 at the very site of the battle, known as the Peak of Freedom.

=== Tributes and distinctions ===
- In the cavalry corps of the Ecuadorian Army, he is always remembered at the weekly changing of the guard with the officer's shout: "Captain Abdón Calderón..."
- There are two military colleges named after him, in the city of Quito and in Cuenca. there is also the "Abdón Calderón" Private Bilingual Educational Unit, located in the canton of Samborondón, in the province of Guayas and a Fiscal Educational Unit in the Canton of Naranjal with the same name. Likewise, the historic gunboat BAE Calderón of the Ecuadorian Navy was named in his honor.
- In mid-September 2014, the Military Police of Venezuela adopted the name "Calderón 352" in honor of the young hero.
