= Alicia Pizzimbono =

Ecuadorian First Lady

First Lady of Ecuador
- In role January 12, 1976 – August 9, 1979
- President: Alfredo Poveda
- Preceded by: Aída Judith León
- Succeeded by: Martha Bucaram

Personal details
- Born: 1930 (age 95–96) Buenos Aires, Argentina
- Spouse: Alfredo Poveda (m. 1950; died 1990)
- Children: María Alexandra; Mónica

Alicia Pizzimbono de Nicola (born 1930, Buenos Aires) was the First Lady of Ecuador.

== Biography ==
Alicia Pizzimbono de Nicola was born in 1930 in the Argentine capital Buenos Aires. She met Alfredo Poveda in 1949 while he was a scholar at the Río Santiago Naval School and wed him on 21 December 1950. Two days later, Poveda graduated as a lieutenant and took Pizzimbono with him back to Ecuador, where their two daughters were born.

=== First Lady of Ecuador ===
On 11 January 1976, the Ecuadorian Armed Forces forced the resignation of military dictator Guillermo Rodríguez. Poveda, along with Army and Air Force heads Guillermo Durán Arcentales and Luis Leoro Franco formed the Supreme Council of Government, which would govern the country until 1979.

On 8 October 1976, Pizzimbono traveled to Kiel, Germany for the ceremonial launch of Ecuador's first submarine the BAE Shyri, named after the First Lady's godmother.

== Citations ==
Preceded by Aída Judith León	First Lady of Ecuador; 1976–1979	Succeeded by Martha Bucaram
