= Teresa Jado =

Former First Lady of Ecuador

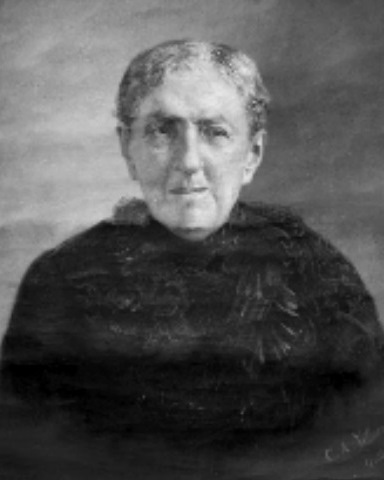

First Lady of Ecuador
- In office July 13, 1852 – October 16, 1856
- Preceded by: Tomasa Carbo y Noboa
- Succeeded by: Carmen de Santistevan y Avilés

Personal details
- Born: Teresa Josefa Jado; October 20, 1819; Guayaquil, Spanish Empire
- Died: May 1, 1910 (aged 90); Lima, Peru
- Resting place: General Cemetery of Guayaquil
- Spouse: José María Urbina

Teresa Josefa Jado y Urbina (Note: The spelling "Urbina" is consistently used for Teresa and her children, but both "Urbina" and "Urvina" are used for her husband in various sources.) (October 20, 1819 – May 1, 1910) was the First Lady of Ecuador from 1852 to 1856 as the wife of President José María Urbina.

== Early life ==
Teresa Jado was born in the city of Guayaquil on October 20, 1819, the daughter of Manuel Mauro Jado Goenaga and María Josefa Urbina y Llaguno.

== Marriage and offspring ==
On March 28, 1845, a few days after the death of her brother Francisco, she met her uncle José María Urbina, who was half-brother to her mother Josefa. Both showed signs of mutual affection and were promised to each other in a future marriage, which took place in the parish of El Sagrario in Guayaquil four years later, on January 14, 1849, when the groom was 41 years old and she was 30.

The couple had five children:

- María Mercedes Urbina y Jado (1850-1879), married Antonio de Lapierre Cucalón in 1874, without offspring
- María Ana de Jesús Rosa de las Mercedes Urbina y Jado (1856-1919), died single and without offspring
- José María de las Mercedes Manuel Adriano Urbina y Jado (1857-1900), died single and without offspring
- Francisco Urbina y Jado (1859-1926), with offspring
- Gabriel Antonio Urbina y Jado (1864-1895), with offspring

== Public life and exile ==
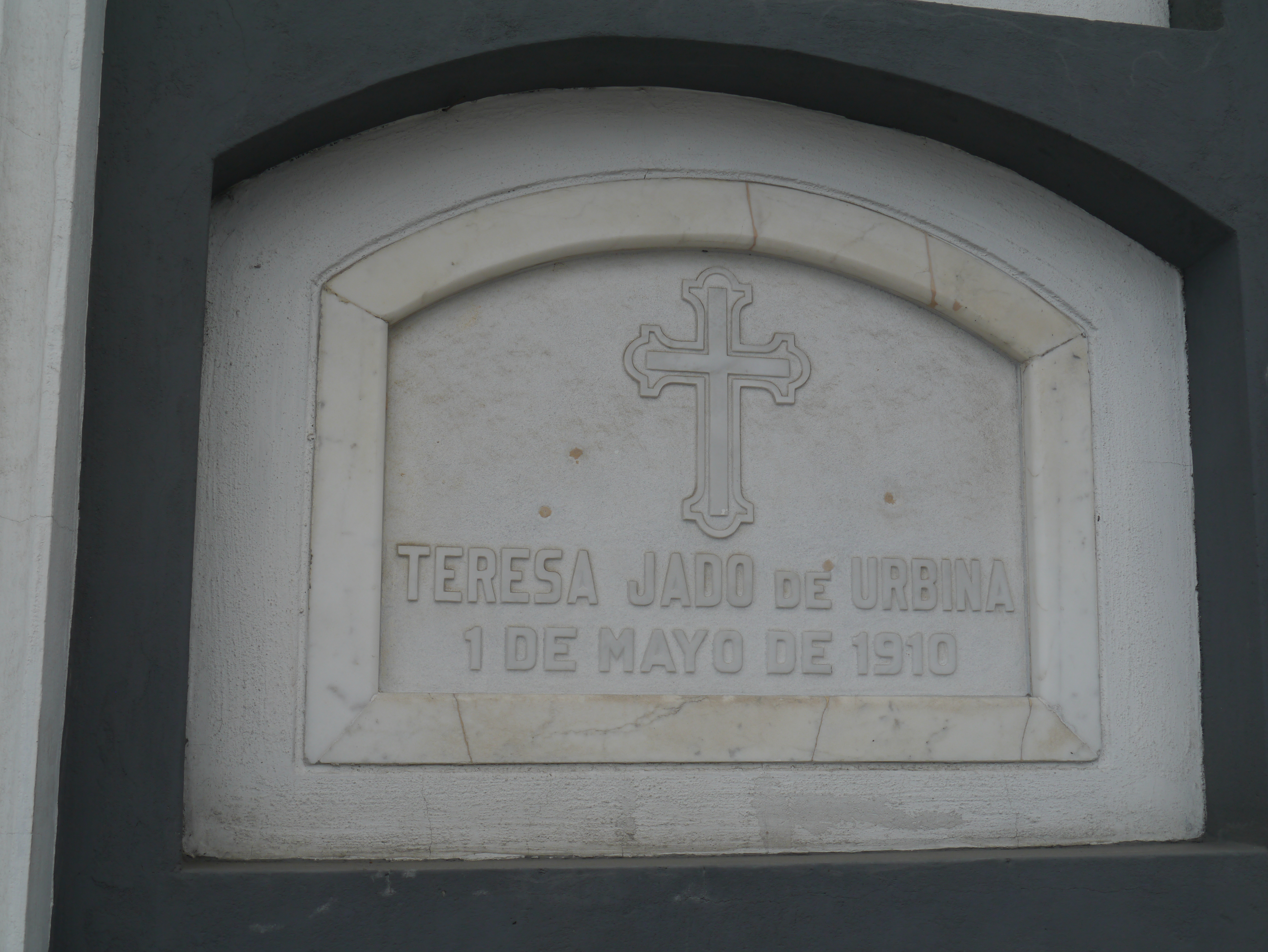
Tomb of Teresa Jado in the General Cemetery of Guayaquil

Jado was a practicing Catholic, coming to defend the cause of the Jesuits who unexpectedly arrived in Guayaquil when they were expelled from the Republic of New Granada in 1851. In 1855, she and her husband were chosen as baptismal sponsors of Emilio Estrada Carmona, who in 1911 would also become President of Ecuador.

In March 1864, President Gabriel García Moreno ordered General Juan José Flores, then Governor of Guayas, to impose exile on Teresa and her four small children, who were unable to attend the wake of her grandmother who had died just twenty hours before. The family moved to Peru, where General Urbina had been sent as Ecuador's Minister of Business in 1847 and then remained in exile. Reunited, they settled in Paita until 1867, when they moved to El Callao.

On January 30, 1876, after the death of García Moreno, the family was able to return to Ecuador when General Urbina was called to be part of the National Constituent Assembly, after which their fortunes improved substantially. During Independence festivities in October 1881, Jado was recognized by the Municipality of Guayaquil, along with Baltazara Calderón de Rocafuerte, Dolores R. de Grimaldo, Adela S. de Vélez, Zoila Dolores Caamaño, and Bolivia Villamil de Ycaza, for philanthropy and carrying out works for the benefit of the indigent and most needy.

== Death ==
Teresa Jado died on May 1, 1910, in Lima, Peru. Her remains were transferred to Ecuador and she was buried in the General Cemetery of Guayaquil, in the same place as her husband, children, and other members of the immediate family.

== Notes ==
Preceded by Tomasa Carbo y Noboa	First Lady of Ecuador; 1852–1856	Succeeded by Carmen de Santistevan y Avilés
