= Carmen de Santistevan y Avilés =

First Lady of Ecuador from 1856 to 1859

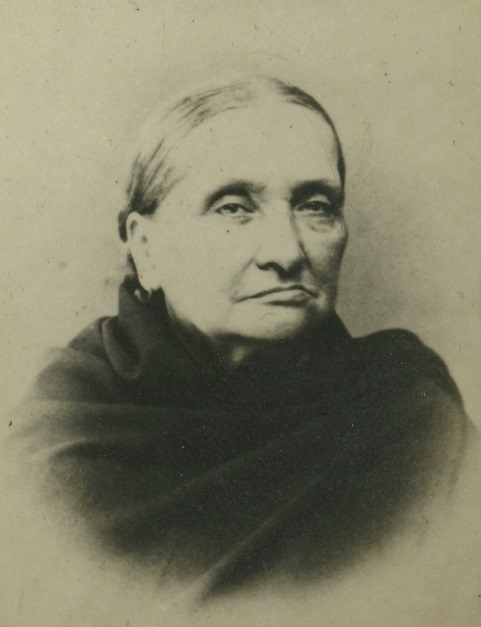

First Lady of Ecuador
- In office October 16, 1856 – August 31, 1859
- Preceded by: Teresa Jado
- Succeeded by: Rosa Ascázubi y Matheu

Personal details
- Born: May 3, 1810; Daule, Spanish Empire
- Died: March 30, 1904 (aged 93); Guayaquil, Ecuador
- Resting place: General Cemetery of Guayaquil
- Spouse: Francisco Robles

Carmen de Santistevan y Avilés (May 3, 1810 – March 30, 1904) was the First Lady of Ecuador from 1856 to 1859 as the wife of President Francisco Robles.

== Early life ==
Carmen de Santistevan y Avilés was born on May 3, 1810, in Daule, then part of the Spanish Empire. She was the daughter of Gabriel de Santistevan y Olvera and his first wife, Francisca de Avilés y Castro, with whom he had another daughter named Francisca. After her father became a widower, he traveled to Buenos Aires, remarried, and had nine children, never returning to Ecuador.

She was a descendant of the paternal line of the Komnenos, an important dynasty of the Byzantine Empire.

== Marriage and offspring ==
Carmen de Santistevan y Avilés met and became engaged to General Francisco Robles while living with her sister Francisca, who was married to Robles's brother, Ciríaco Robles García. Their wedding took place on November 5, 1835, in Guayaquil Cathedral.

The marriage produced three children, the first of whom did not reach adulthood:

- Francisco Robles y Santistevan (1838–1841)
- Ignacio Robles y Santistevan (1839–1915), married to Rafaela de Buenaventura y Macías, with offspring
- Dolores Robles y Santistevan (1841–1904), married to José Serafín Baquerizo Vera, with offspring

Her son Ignacio became a corvette captain, the civil and military chief of the Plaza de Guayaquil (1895), Eloy Alfaro's Minister of Foreign Affairs (1895–1896), the governor of Guayas (1896–1898), and the consul of Mexico in Guayaquil (1896–1902), among other posts. The wedding of her daughter Dolores took place on September 26, 1856, in the halls of Carondelet Palace.

== Later years ==
A practicing Catholic, she joined others (such as First Lady Teresa Jado) in defending the cause of the Jesuits who unexpectedly arrived in Guayaquil when they were expelled from the Republic of New Granada in 1851.

Carmen de Santistevan y Avilés died in Guayaquil on March 30, 1904, at the age of 93. She was buried in the General Cemetery, where the family owned a mausoleum richly decorated with sculptures.

Preceded by Teresa Jado	First Lady of Ecuador; 1856–1859	Succeeded by Rosa Ascázubi y Matheu
