= Baltazara Calderón =

Former First Lady of Ecuador

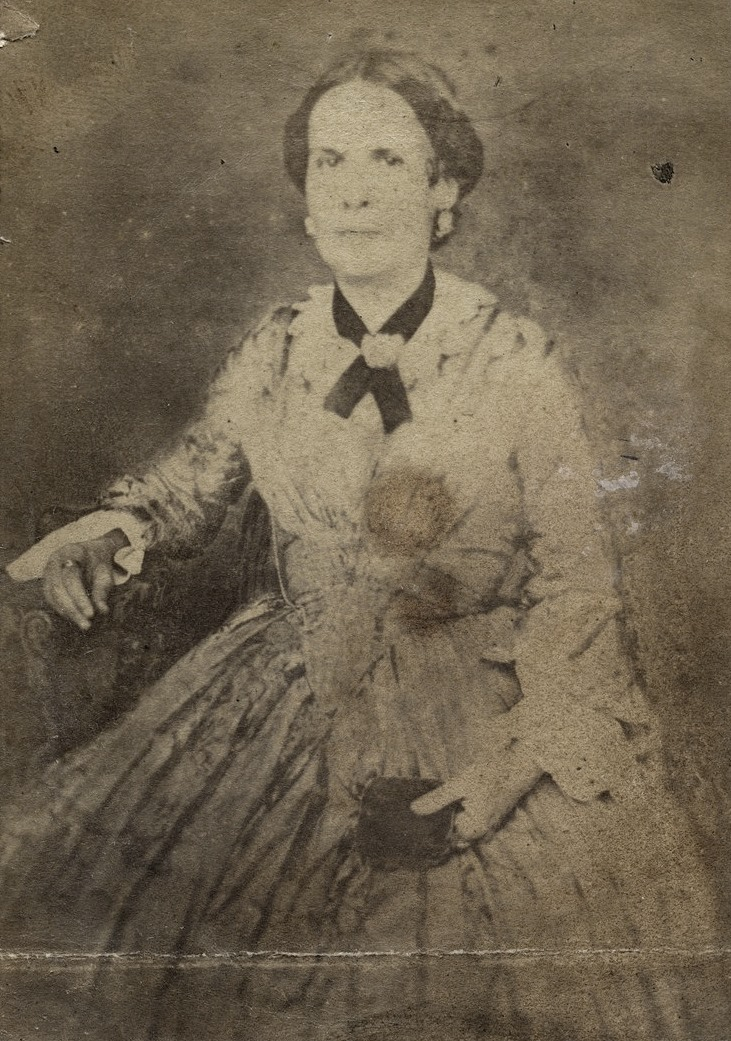
- Caledrón in 1870

First Lady of Ecuador
- In office September 10, 1834 – January 31, 1839
- Preceded by: Mercedes Jijón
- Succeeded by: Mercedes Jijón

Personal details
- Born: Josefa Baltazara Calderón Garaycoa; January 6, 1806 Cuenca, Viceroyalty of New Granada
- Died: June 7, 1890 (aged 84) Guayaquil, Ecuador
- Resting place: General Cemetery of Guayaquil
- Spouse: Vicente Rocafuerte
- Relatives: Abdón Calderón Garaycoa (brother)
- Occupation: Philanthropist

Josefa Baltazara Calderón Garaycoa (January 6, 1806 – June 7, 1890), also known by her married name of Baltazara Calderón de Rocafuerte, was an Ecuadorian philanthropist, the wife of the second president of Ecuador, Vicente Rocafuerte, and sister of Abdón Calderón Garaycoa.

== Biography ==
Baltazara Calderón was born in Cuenca on January 6, 1806, the daughter of Francisco García Calderón y Díaz and Manuela de Jesús Garaycoa y Llaguno. On December 3, 1812, her father was executed by commander Juan Sámano, after which her family moved to Guayaquil. There she was instructed under the tutelage of José Joaquín de Olmedo and Vicente Rocafuerte, from whom she learned the French language.

Calderón married Rocafuerte in the chapel of the Episcopal Palace of Guayaquil on February 10, 1842. During her husband's presidency, a yellow fever epidemic broke out in Ecuador, and she fell ill, but quickly recovered. She moved with her husband to Quito after he left the governorship, and then went with him into exile in Lima. Both returned to Ecuador in November 1845, after the March Revolution. They left Guayaquil again in 1846, landing in Callao in December of the same year, where Rocafuerte fell ill, and wrote his will, naming her heir to all his assets. She was widowed at dawn on May 16, 1847, and it was from Lima that she began her charitable work.

She sent part of the library left by Rocafuerte to the San Vicente del Guayas school, today called the Colegio Vicente Rocafuerte. She returned to Guayaquil in 1857, and became a patron of the Guayaquil Fire Department, building a tank for the fire pump next to her house. In December 1873, she donated 9,000 pesos through the Ministry of Finance for the improvement of roads in the provinces of Azuay and Imbabura.

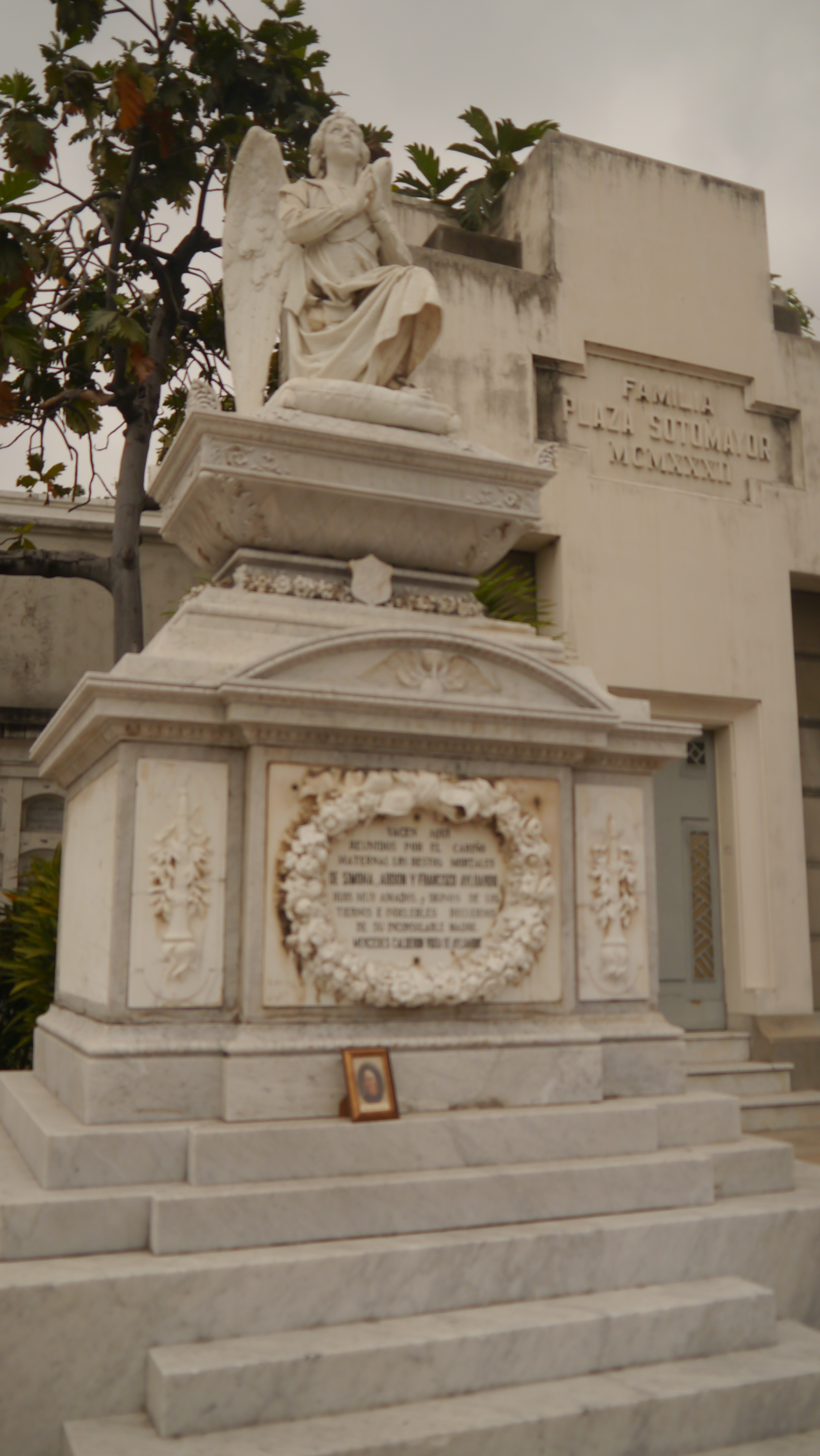
Mausoleum of the Ayluardo Calderón family, resting place of Baltazara Calderón, in the General Cemetery of Guayaquil

In 1881, Baltazara Rocafuerte, along with Teresa Jado, Dolores R. de Grimaldo, Adela S. de Vélez, Zoila Dolores Caamaño, and Bolivia Villamil de Ycaza, was appointed by the Municipality of Guayaquil to award philanthropic merits to ladies of the city who had carried out works for the benefit of the indigent and most needy during the independence festivities in October. In the same year, she was the godmother of honor of the first meeting of the Guayas Philanthropic Society, and of the inauguration of the Vélez asylum, run by the Guayaquil Charity Board. She dedicated herself to investing her fortune into charities, educational establishments, curatorial boards of schools, hospitals, and fire departments.

In February 1890, she became ill again, and dictated her will, naming Pedro Carbo and Rafael Pólit as executors, and her sister Mercedes Calderón Garaycoa as consulting executor. Doctors diagnosed and treated her for breast cancer.

She died on June 7, 1890, abandoned by her relatives due to beliefs at the time that the disease was contagious. The following day, she was interred in the mausoleum that Mercedes Ayluardo built for her children at the General Cemetery of Guayaquil.
