= Lavinia Valbonesi =

First Lady of Ecuador since 2023

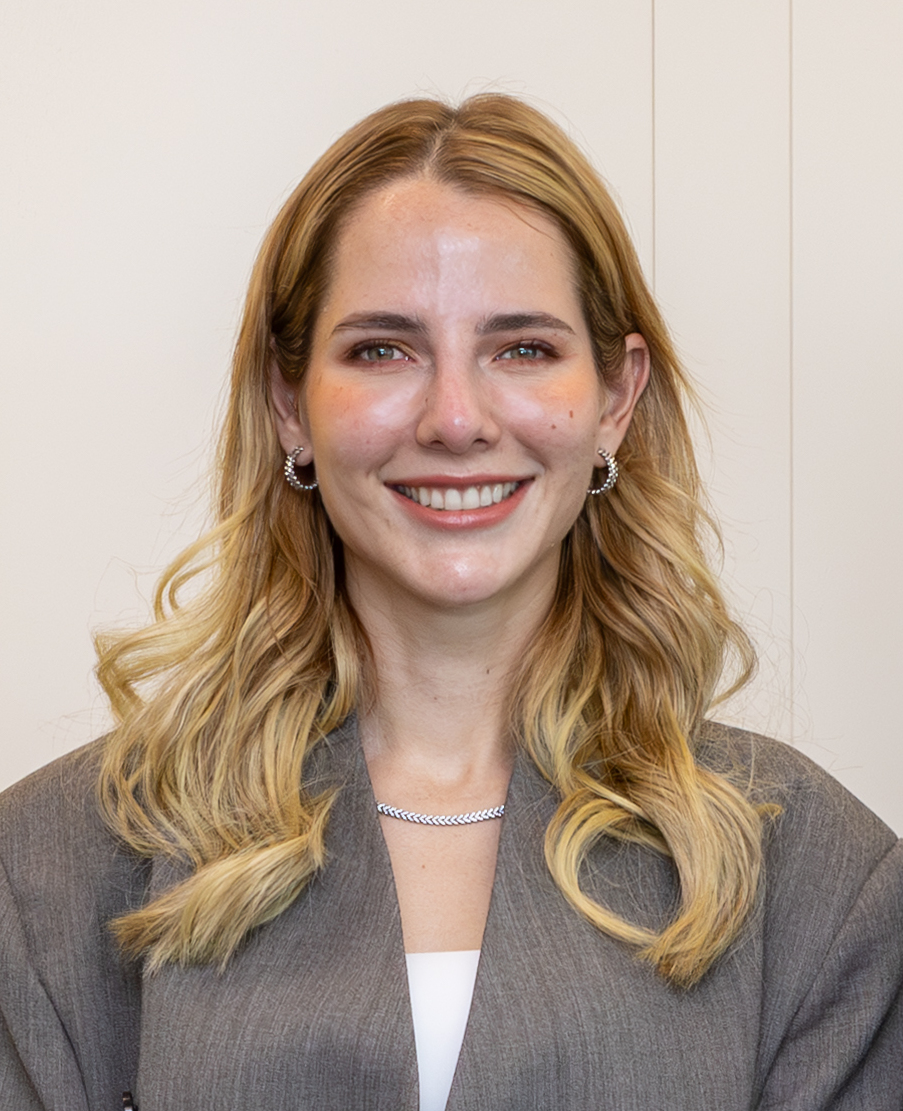
- Valbonesi in 2025

First Lady of Ecuador
- Assumed role 23 November 2023
- President: Daniel Noboa
- Preceded by: María de Lourdes Alcívar Crespo

Personal details
- Born: Ángela Lavinia Valbonesi Acosta; 8 April 1998 (age 28) Chone, Ecuador
- Spouse: Daniel Noboa (m. 2021)
- Children: 2
- Relatives: Álvaro Noboa (father-in-law); Anabella Azín (mother-in-law)
- Education: Liceo Panamericano
- Occupation: businesswoman; social media influencer

Ángela Lavinia Valbonesi Acosta (born 8 April 1998) is an Ecuadorian businesswoman, nutritional coach, and social media influencer who is the current first lady of Ecuador since 2023 as the wife of President Daniel Noboa.

A nutritional coach, Valbonesi owns a healthy dining establishment, fitness center and has specialized in healthier diets and weight loss. She has also gained a large social media following on Instagram and TikTok, amassing over 1 million and around 934,500 followers respectively as of April 2025.

== Early life ==
Valbonesi was born Ángela Lavinia Valbonesi Acosta on 8 April 1998 in Chone, Ecuador, daughter of Italian father Furio Valbonesi (1953-2024) and Ecuadorian mother Gloria Acosta (b. January 16, 1968), She was raised in the Galapagos Islands of Ecuador. She studied at the Liceo Panamericano. She specializes in nutrition and is a nutritionist coach and personal trainer. Valbonesi stated that when she was 15 years old, she had body image issues until she attended a fitness conference in Australia in 2015.

Valbonesi maintains a fitness center in Tampa, Florida. Valbonesi is the owner of a healthy dining establishment, Green Deli, located in Guayaquil.

She began her social media career in 2014 at the age of 16. At first, her social media posts focused on her personal life, modeling and her lifestyle, however she soon began focusing on nutrition and fitness. She has also modeled for several beauty care brands such as Herbal Essences.

== First Lady of Ecuador ==
=== 2023 general election ===
During the 2023 Ecuadorian presidential elections, she accompanied her husband Daniel Noboa during the campaign trail. In August 2023, when her husband came in second place and advanced to the run-off, Valbonesi was the most searched person on Google in the country. Valbonesi utilized her social media status to influence Noboa's campaign with the younger voters and boosted his image. She remained popular through her fashion style during the campaign trail. Her clothing choice of wearing white was noted during the election cycle, even wearing a white bulletproof vest during campaign events.

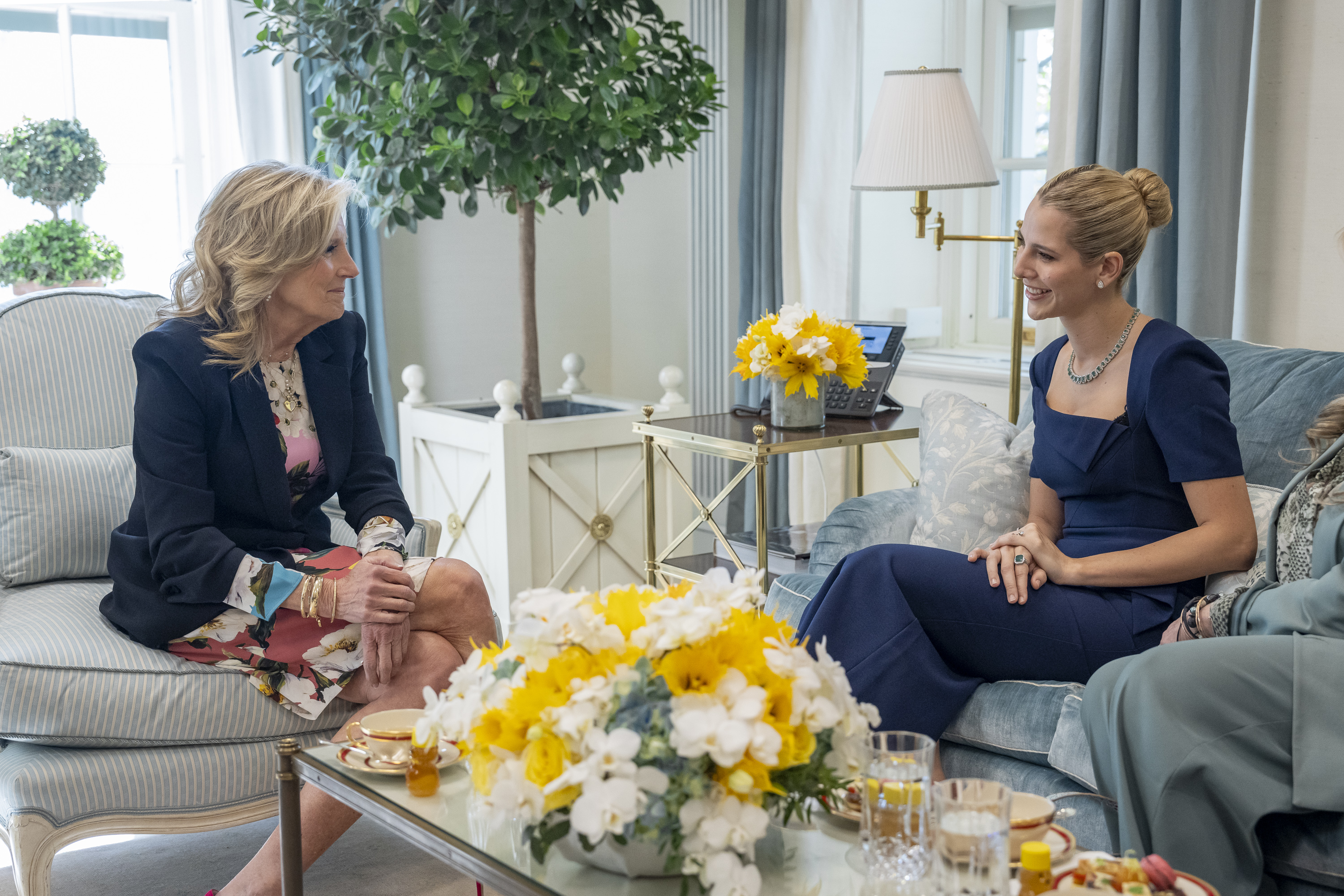
Valbonesi with U.S. First Lady Jill Biden at the White House in February 2024

In the weeks leading to the run-off election, supporters of Noboa began promoting the idea of Valbonesi becoming first lady rather than her husband becoming president. Her Guayaquil-based restaurant Green Deli, began selling the 'First Lady Smoothie' before the run-off election.

On 15 October 2023, Noboa was elected president, making Valbonesi the first lady-designate of the country. She is the country's youngest First Lady, having become so at the age of 25.

=== Tenure ===
Valbonesi became first lady of Ecuador when her husband was inaugurated president on 23 November 2023. She has said that one of her first initiatives as first lady was to provide assistance to single mothers. Within two weeks she was given planning permission to build on land that she owned by Environment Minister Sade Fritschi.

== Personal life ==
In 2019, she met Daniel Noboa when he hired her as his personal nutritionist to lose weight. They were married on 28 August 2021. They have two sons.she was expecting her third child, Stefano, but due to complications during the pregnancy that led her to undergo emergency surgery on August 15, 2026, her baby’s death was confirmed, thus declaring 3 days of mourning, being this the first death inside of the Carondelet Palace in the history

In an interview with Radio Centro, Valbonesi expressed her "horror" when Noboa shifted from his business career to politics when he ran for the National Assembly in the 2021 election. However, she quickly shifted her attitude after joining Noboa on the campaign trail.
