= Ana Paredes Arosemena =

Former First Lady of Ecuador

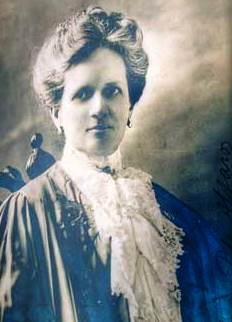

First Lady of Ecuador
- In office 16 January 1906 – 12 August 1911
- Preceded by: Diana Plaza Gutiérrez
- Succeeded by: Lastenia Gamarra Menéndez
- In office 5 June 1895 – 31 August 1901
- Preceded by: Clementina Cordero Dávila
- Succeeded by: Diana Plaza Gutiérrez

Personal details
- Born: Ana Paredes y Arosemena; 25 May 1854; Panama City, Province of Panama, Republic of New Granada
- Died: 25 May 1920 (aged 66); Panama City, Panama
- Spouse: Eloy Alfaro (m. 1872)

Ana Paredes Arosemena (2 March 1854 – 25 May 1920) was the wife of Eloy Alfaro, the president of Ecuador on two occasions. She was therefore First Lady of the Nation, first between 1895 and 1901, and second between 1906 and 1911.

== Biography ==
Paredes was born in Panama City, (then part of Colombia), on 2 March 1854. From a family of aristocrats, her father was José María Paredes Arce and her mother Catalina Arosemena Quesada. She met who would be her husband while he was in exile in the city. Alfaro had arrived in Panama after a failed revolt against the then president Gabriel García Moreno, and he prosperously dedicated himself to commerce. The couple married on 10 January 1872, when Paredes was 18 years old.

When Alfaro returned to Ecuador in 1875, his wife and his children remained in the Panamanian capital. In 1878, she had to advocate before the Consul of Colombia so that he interceded for her husband, who had been arrested in Ecuador. The act favorably achieved the freedom of General Alfaro after 97 days in prison, returning immediately to his family in Panama. After going through economic hardships, and again suffering the departure of her husband to lead the Liberal Revolution, Ana and her children first set foot on Ecuadorian soil in 1895, becoming the nation's First Lady.

Alfaro and Paredes had a total of nine children, of which only five would reach adulthood, three women and two men.

== Death ==
After having formed a home that was admired by much of the society of the time, Mrs. Ana Paredes de Alfaro returned a widow to her native Panama, where she died on 25 May 1920, at sixty-six years of age. She suffered from blindness in her final years, having been widowed for eight years.
