= Carmen Salinas de la Vega =

Former First Lady of Ecuador

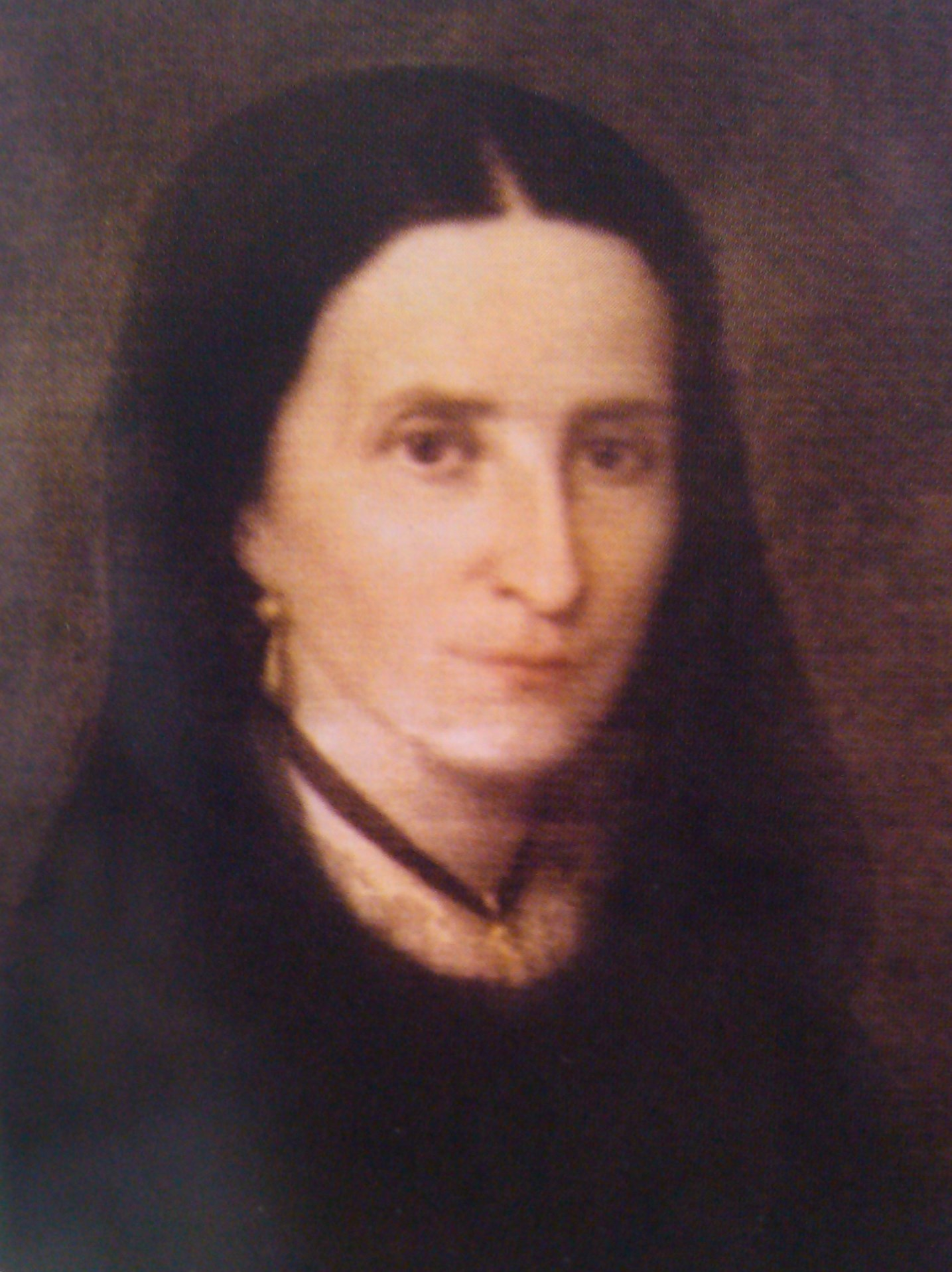

First Lady of Ecuador
- In role October 15, 1849 – June 10, 1850
- President: Manuel de Ascásubi
- Preceded by: Juana Andrade Fuente Fría
- Succeeded by: Tomasa Carbo y Noboa
- In office May 16, 1869 – August 10, 1869
- Preceded by: Mariana del Alcázar
- Succeeded by: Mariana del Alcázar

Personal details
- Born: María del Carmen Celestina Ascencia Salinas y de la Vega; June 1807 Quito, Spanish Empire
- Died: 1 May 1881 (aged 73) Quito, Republic of Ecuador
- Spouse: Manuel de Ascásubi
- Children: See Marriage and descendants

Carmen Salinas de la Vega (María del Carmen Celestina Ascencia Salinas y de la Vega (June 1807 – 1 May 1881) was an Ecuadorian aristocrat, and the First Lady of Ecuador to Manuel de Ascásubi from 1849 to 1850 and once again in 1869.

== Biography ==
Carmen Salinas de la Vega was born María del Carmen Celestina Ascencia Salinas y de la Vega to Juan de Salinas y Zenitagoya, a hero of the Ecuadorian War of Independence, and his wife María de la Vega y Nates, a Creole.
When her father was killed in the 2 August 1810 mutiny, thanks to the religious community of Quito, her mother and oldest sister María Dolores served their sentences banished to the Monastery of La Concepción, thus avoiding being hanged for their support of the riot, but their property was confiscated by order of the President of the Province of Quito, Manuel Ruiz Urriés de Castilla.
Her mother died on 1 December 1820 and was buried at the Basílica de Nuestra Señora de la Merced, leaving Maria Dolores to look after Carmen, now aged 13. After the War of Ecuadorian Independence, the sisters recovered their properties when it was restored to them by Colonel Antonio José de Sucre in 1822.

== Marriage and descendants ==
Salinas married Manuel de Ascásubi, future President of Ecuador, whose mother was Marquess of Maenza and Countess of Puñonrostro, a title he would not inherit because of laws issued by Simón Bolívar and then ratified by the Ecuadorian government). They had four daughters:

- Avelina Ascázubi y Salinas de la Vega, married to the widower of María Dolores, her cousin José María Lasso de la Vega, with whom she had two children:
  - José Manuel Lasso de la Vega and Ascázubi, were born in Paris and married María Esther Paulina Carrión
  - María Avelina Lasso de la Vega y Ascázubi, married Leónidas Plaza. Her son, Galo Plaza, would also be the President of Ecuador
- María Ascázubi y Salinas de la Vega, married her distant cousin Cristóbal Jijón, with whom she had two children:
  - Antonia Jijón y Ascázubi, married her cousin Neptalí Bonifaz and Ascázubi
  - Dolores Jijón and Ascázubi, married Enrique Gangotena
- Dolores Ascázubi y Salinas de la Vega, married her cousin José María Lasso de la Vega, with whom she became a widower and had no children.
- Josefina Ascázubi y Salinas de la Vega, married José Mateo Neptalí Bonifaz, with whom she had two children:
  - Neptalí Bonifaz y Ascázubi, married his cousin Antonia Jijón y Ascázubi
  - Manuel, married María del Tránsito Filomena Francisca Rosa Hipólita Panizo

== See also ==
- Manuel de Ascásubi
- Juan de Salinas y Zenitagoya
