= Lucila Santos Trujillo =

Ecuadorian First Lady (1928–2020)

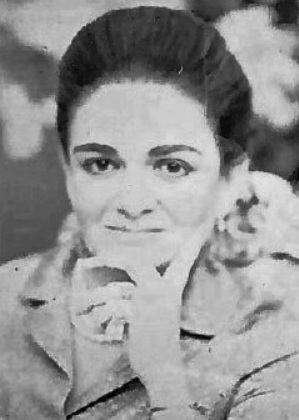

First Lady of Ecuador
- In role November 16, 1966 – August 31, 1968
- President: Otto Arosemena
- Preceded by: Victoria Mercedes Gómez Icaza
- Succeeded by: Corina del Parral

Personal details
- Born: July 9, 1928 (disputed); Portoviejo, Ecuador
- Died: May 4, 2020 (aged 91); Guayaquil, Ecuador
- Spouse: Otto Arosemena (m. 1947; died 1984)
- Children: Otto Luis; Fabiola Lucila; María Auxiliadora

Lucila Santos Trujillo (9 July 1928 – 4 May 2020) was First Lady of Ecuador to Otto Arosemena from 16 November 1966 to 31 August 1968.

== Biography ==
Santos was born in Portoviejo, the daughter of Atanasio Santos Chávez, Governor of Manabí Province, and Lucila Trujillo Gutiérrez.

In 1947, she married Otto Arosemena in Guayaquil, and the couple had three children. In 1955, they acquired a neocolonial property in Guayaquil and named it Villa Lucile. They sold the property in 1962 and moved to Quito, where Arosemena had been living since 1957 for his political offices. When he became President of Ecuador in 1966, Santos likewise became First Lady and the host of Carondelet Palace during her husband's presidency.

In addition to the First Lady's traditional role as president of the National Institute for Children and the Family, Santos promoted the "One School a Day" program, which built schools across Ecuador. She died in Guayaquil.

Preceded by Victoria Mercedes Gómez Icaza	First Lady of Ecuador; 1972–1976	Succeeded by Corina del Parral
