= Aída Judith León =

Ecuadorian first lady (1928–2024)

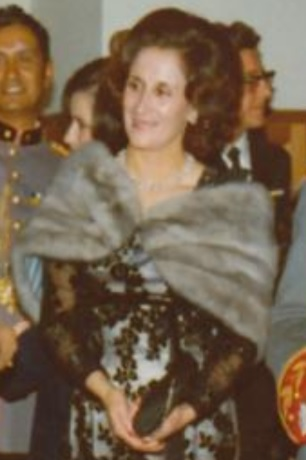
- León in 1975

First Lady of Ecuador
- In role 15 February 1972 – 11 January 1976
- President: Guillermo Rodríguez
- Preceded by: Corina del Parral
- Succeeded by: Alicia Pizzimbono

Personal details
- Born: Aída Judith León Lara; 23 June 1928 Pujilí, Cotopaxi, Ecuador
- Died: 20 November 2024 (aged 96) Quito, Pichincha, Ecuador
- Spouse: Guillermo Rodríguez (m. 1953)
- Children: 5

Aída Judith León Lara (23 June 1928 – 20 November 2024) was the First Lady of Ecuador to Guillermo Rodríguez, her husband.

== Biography ==
León was born in Pujilí, Cotopaxi Province to Pujileños José Gabriel León Jácome and Matilde Victoria Lara Rubio. In 1953, she married General Guillermo Rodríguez and had five children.

As First Lady of Ecuador, León was president of the National Children's Trust (INNFA since 1980). She focused on institutionalizing it, giving it legal status and drawing up a complete inventory of assets it owned created by Corina del Parral in 1960. In this capacity, she enjoyed the support of the Comptroller General.

Early in 1973, León was in charge of the evacuation and treatment of victims of a flood in Babahoyo, where she suffered sepsis that required treatment at the Walter Reed National Military Medical Center in Washington D.C.

León died in Quito on 20 November 2024, at age 96.

== Citations ==
Preceded by Alicia Pizzimbono	First Lady of Ecuador; 1972–1976	Succeeded by Corina del Parral
