= Dolores Gangotena =

Ecuadorian First Lady

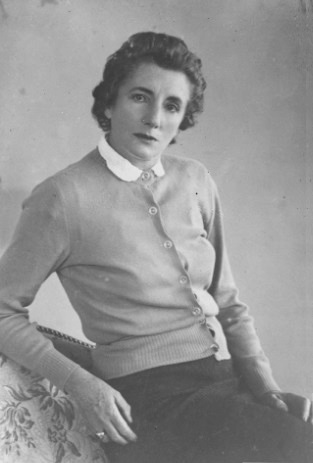
- Dolores Gangotena circa 1950

First Lady of Ecuador
- In role September 1, 1956 – August 31, 1960
- President: Camilo Ponce Enríquez
- Preceded by: Corina del Parral
- Succeeded by: Corina del Parral

Personal details
- Born: Quito, Ecuador
- Died: Quito, Ecuador
- Spouse: Camilo Ponce Enríquez (m. 1940; died 1976)
- Children: Camilo; Enrique; Margarita; Inés Clara; Dolores
- Occupation: Conservationist

Dolores Marta Gracia de Gangotena y Jijón was an Ecuadorian art collector, conservationist. She was First Lady of Ecuador to Camilo Ponce Enríquez from 16 September 1956 to 31 August 1960.

== Biography ==
Dolores Gangotena was born in Quito, the second of four children born to Enrique Gangotena y Jijón and Dolores de Jijón y Ascázubi. Through her mother, Gangotena was related to Juan de Salinas y Zenitagoya and Javier de Ascázubi, heroes of the war for Ecuador's independence. In 1940, Gangotena married Camilo Ponce Enríquez.

Despite prejudices of the times and the opposition of her father, Gangotena entered university and studied fine arts. The collection of pre-Columbian and Colonial-era Ecuadorian art became her passion.

As First Lady of Ecuador, Gangotena was the host of Carondelet Palace and attended national and international functions for her husband's government. Because the Carondelet Palace was undergoing remodeling, many of those functions were held at the Gangotena Palace on the Plaza de San Francisco in Quito, or the Hacienda La Herrería in the Los Chillos valley. Gangotena used this rural property to store most of her art collection.

== Citations ==
Preceded by Corina del Parral	First Lady of Ecuador; 1956–1960	Succeeded by Corina del Parral
