= María Eugenia Cordovez =

First Lady of Ecuador (1934–2012)

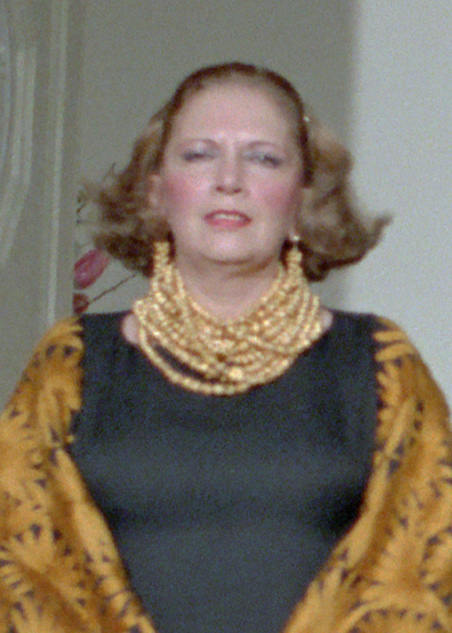

First Lady of Ecuador
- In role August 10, 1984 – August 10, 1988
- President: León Febres Cordero
- Preceded by: Margarita Pérez Pallares
- Succeeded by: Carmen Calisto

Personal details
- Born: November 11, 1934 Lima, Peru
- Died: September 30, 2012 (aged 77) Guayaquil, Ecuador
- Cause of death: Heart failure
- Spouse: León Febres Cordero (m. 1954; div. 1988)
- Children: María Eugenia; María Fernanda; María Liliana; María Auxiliadora
- Parent(s): Alfonso Cordovez Caicedo; María Pontón Ávila

María Eugenia Cordovez Pontón (November 11, 1934 – September 30, 2012) served as the former First Lady of Ecuador from 1984 to 1988. She was the ex-wife of the former President of Ecuador León Febres Cordero. As First Lady, Cordovez served as the chairwoman of Ecuador's National Institute for Children and Family (Innfa). She and former President Febres Cordero divorced in 1988 after thirty-four years of marriage. Both later remarried.

Cordovez died from cardiac arrest at her home Guayaquil, Ecuador, on September 30, 2012. She was buried at Cemetery Parque de la Paz in Samborondón.
