= Carmen Calisto =

36th First Lady of Ecuador

First Lady of Ecuador
- In role 10 August 1988 – 9 August 1992
- President: Rodrigo Borja Cevallos
- Preceded by: María Eugenia Cordovez
- Succeeded by: Josefina Villalobos

Personal details
- Born: Carmen Calisto Ponce; 28 February 1942 (age 83) Quito, Ecuador
- Party: Democratic Left
- Spouse: Rodrigo Borja Cevallos (m. 1966; died 2025)
- Children: 4
- Awards: Order of Isabella the Catholic

Carmen Calisto Ponce (born 28 February 1942) is the widow of former Ecuadorian President Rodrigo Borja Cevallos and is thus the 36th First Lady of Ecuador, a position she held from 10 August 1988 to 9 August 1992.

== Biography ==
Carmen Calisto Ponce was born in Quito on 28 February 1942 the eldest daughter of Gonzalo Calisto Enríquez and María Ponce Martínez, making her a descendant of the Counts of Selva Florida through her mother. When Calisto's mother died in her youth, she took on the responsibility of looking after her younger siblings.

=== Marriage and children ===
On 16 December 1966, in the city of Quito, Calisto married Rodrigo Borja Cevallos, at that time Jurist Commission that then President Clemente Yerovi assembled to draft a new constitution. They had four children:

- Gabriela Borja Calisto
- María del Carmen Borja Calisto
- Rodrigo Borja Calisto
- Verónica Borja Calisto

=== First Lady of Ecuador ===
As First Lady of Ecuador, Calisto was president of the National Institute of Children and Families (INNFA), hostess of Carondelet Palace, and companion to her husband to various formal functions at the national and international level. In a state visit to Spain, the couple were received by King Juan Carlos and Queen Sofía at the Palace of Zarzuela and Royal Palace of Madrid and Calisto was made a Grand Dame of Order of Isabella the Catholic.

== Awards ==
- Order of Isabella the Catholic, Grand Cross. Granted by Juan Carlos I of Spain on 8 September 1989.

== Citations ==
Preceded by María Eugenia Cordovez	First Lady of Ecuador; 1988-1992	Succeeded by Josefina Villalobos
