= Josefina Villalobos =

First Lady of Ecuador (1924–2025)

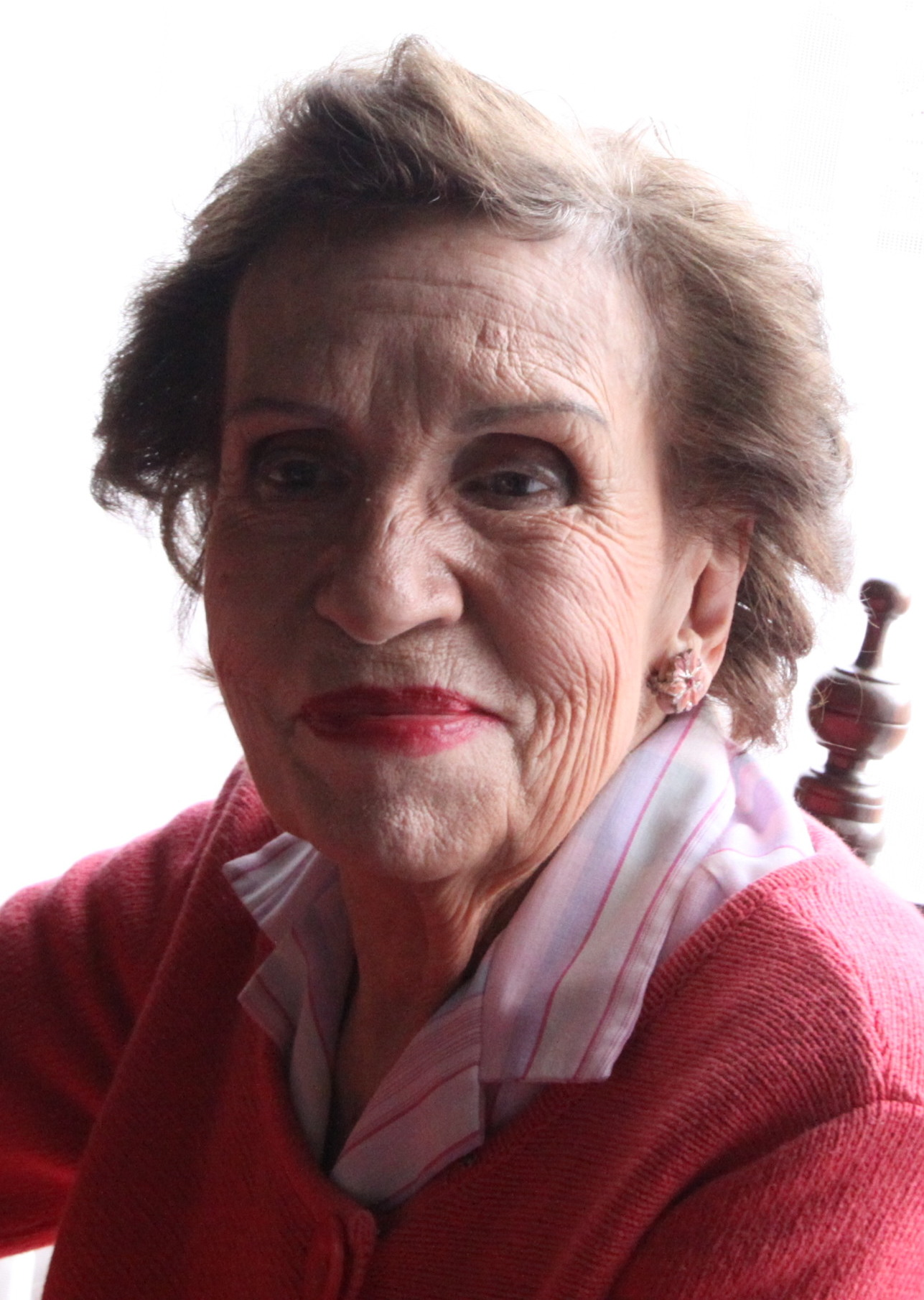
- Villalobos in 2011

First Lady of Ecuador
- In role August 10, 1992 – August 10, 1996
- Preceded by: Carmen Calisto
- Succeeded by: María Rosa Pulley Vergara

Personal details
- Born: Josefina Isabel Villalobos Páramo; August 5, 1924 New York City, U.S.
- Died: February 24, 2025 (aged 100) Quito, Ecuador
- Spouse: Sixto Durán Ballén (m. 1945; died 2016)
- Children: 9

Josefina Isabel Villalobos Páramo (August 5, 1924 – February 24, 2025) was an American-born Colombian-Ecuadorian public servant. She was the First Lady of Ecuador serving from August 10, 1992, through August 10, 1996, when her husband, Sixto Durán Ballén, served as President of Ecuador.

== Early life ==
Villalobos was born in New York City to Colombian parents. In 1945, she married Sixto Durán Ballén.

== First Lady (1992–1996) ==
As the first lady of the nation, Villalobos was known in the media and by the Ecuadorian people Finita de Durán-Ballén. When she became first lady, she played a vital role in the creation of the National Institute of the Child and the Family (INNFA). She was known for hosting of Carondelet Palace and accompanying her husband on various trips nationally and internationally. Josefina was the oldest first lady at 68 years old when her husband won the presidency of the Republic in 1992.

== Personal life and death ==
Ballén and Villalobos had nine children. After Ballén left office, the two retired and lived in Quito, Ecuador. On November 15, 2016, Ballén died at the age of 95. Villalobos became a centenarian on August 5, 2024, and died in Quito on February 24, 2025, at the age of 100.

Preceded by Carmen Calisto	First Lady of Ecuador; 1992–1996	Succeeded by María Rosa Pulley Vergara
