= Corina del Parral =

Ecuadorian First Lady

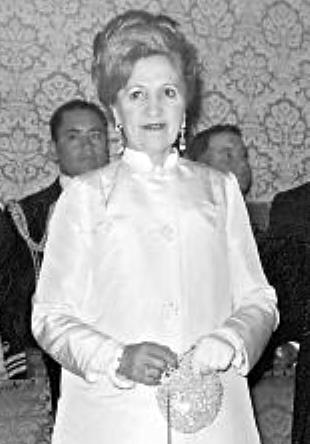

First Lady of Ecuador
- President: José María Velasco Ibarra
- In office 28 May 1944 – 24 August 1947
- Preceded by: María Teresa Rivas Vergara
- Succeeded by: Ana Luisa Velasco Serrano
- In role 1 September 1952 – 31 August 1956
- Preceded by: Rosario Pallares Zaldumbide
- Succeeded by: Dolores Gangotena
- In role 1 September 1960 – 7 November 1961
- Preceded by: Dolores Gangotena
- Succeeded by: Gladys Peet
- In role 1 September 1968 – 15 February 1972
- Preceded by: Lucila Santos Trujillo
- Succeeded by: Aída Judith León

Personal details
- Born: Corina del Parral Durán; 25 January 1905 Bahía Blanca, Buenos Aires, Argentina
- Died: 8 February 1979 (aged 74) Buenos Aires, Argentina
- Spouse: José María Velasco Ibarra (m. 1938; died 1979)
- Occupation: Pianist; poet; writer

Corina del Parral Durán (25 January 1905 – 8 February 1979) was an Argentine writer, poet, pianist, and composer. Married to President José María Velasco Ibarra, she served four terms as the First Lady of Ecuador.

== Biography ==
Corina del Parral Durán was born in Bahía Blanca, Argentina to Ernst Patrick Parral López-Chacón and Corina Eulogia Durán Peña on 25 January 1905. She began basic studies at the French Institute of Jeanne d'Arc and music at the Williams Conservatory, both in Bahía Blanca. She graduated from the latter with high marks, then went to Buenos Aires to continue her music and piano studies. Using her musical education, del Parral composed classical pieces for the piano and orchestra, and Argentine and Ecuadorian folk music. Her Ecuadorian musical folk songs were interpreted by the group Los Brillantes to raise funds for the Ecuadorian institution she founded herself, while she was the First Lady of Ecuador, to support the poorest childhood in Ecuador. Her music was recorded on acetate discs. Parral's works as a writer have been published by the House of Ecuadorian culture and the Central Bank of Ecuador.

In 1934, Parral and her mother attended a reception for an Ecuadorian plenipotentiary in Buenos Aires, where she met the newly elected President of Ecuador, José María Velasco Ibarra. When he was deposed, del Parral began corresponding with Velasco to encourage him during his exile to Colombia. The couple's epistolary relationship resulted in their marriage in Buenos Aires on 24 August 1938.

=== First Lady of Ecuador ===
When José María Velasco Ibarra was elected for the second time in 1944, Parral became First Lady of Ecuador. In this capacity, she founded the institution that later became the National Institute for Children and the Family, a position that henceforth would be held by all Ecuadorian First Ladies.
