= Inés Jijón =

Ecuadorian composer and pianist

- Born: María Inés Jijón Rojas; 23 December 1909; Quito, Ecuador
- Died: 7 May 1995 (aged 85) Quito, Ecuador

María Inés Jijón Rojas de Fernández Salvador (1909–1995), known as Inés Jijón, was an Ecuadorian pianist, composer, and teacher. Jijón composed over 150 songs, several of which won prizes. In his history of Ecuadorian music, Mario Godoy wrote that with Jijón, "the presence of women in art music was inaugurated."

== Biography ==
Inés Jijón was born in Quito on 23 December 1909. From the age of five she was taught piano by her relative Lucila Meneses de Neira. She studied at the National Conservatory of Music in Quito, where she graduated with distinction in 1937.

Jijón taught piano at the Instituto Interamericano de Música Sacra, at several schools in Quito, and from 1948 at the National Conservatory of Music. She performed with the Ecuadorian National Symphony Orchestra, and on various radio programmes. Jijón was also director of musical arts at the Casa de la Cultura Ecuatoriana, with whom she published her work Catálogo general del Museo de Instrumentos Pedro Traversari in 1971. She was involved in the organisation of the Library of Ecuadorian Musical Works (Spanish: Biblioteca de Obras Musicales Ecuatorianas) and the Museum of Musical Arts (Spanish: Museo de Artes Musicales).

Jijón composed over 150 songs, several of which won prizes. She died on 7 May 1995 in Quito.

== Recognition and awards ==
- Gold medal of the Council of Guayas Province in 1944
- First prize in the 1964 composition competition of the Guayaquil Patronato del Arte Lírico, with the pasillo "Romanza"
- First prize of the National Union of Journalists in 1956, with the pasillo "Tierra Mía"
- First prize of the Sixto María Durán competition of the Metropolitan District of Quito in 1980, for "Poema de los Andes"

== Compositions and other works ==
Jijón's notable musical compositions include "Poema de los Andes", "La Suite de la Serranía", "Tierra Mía", and "Tus Ojos Madre Mía". Her other published works include:

- Música (1957)
- Villancicos de Inés Jijon (1980s)
- Música Ecuatoriana Selecta Para Piano
- Canciones Para Los Niños de mi Patria
- Metodología de Música
- Conocimientos Musicales Para el Normalisata
