= Mercedes Jijón =

First lady of Ecuador

Mercedes Jijón de Vivanco
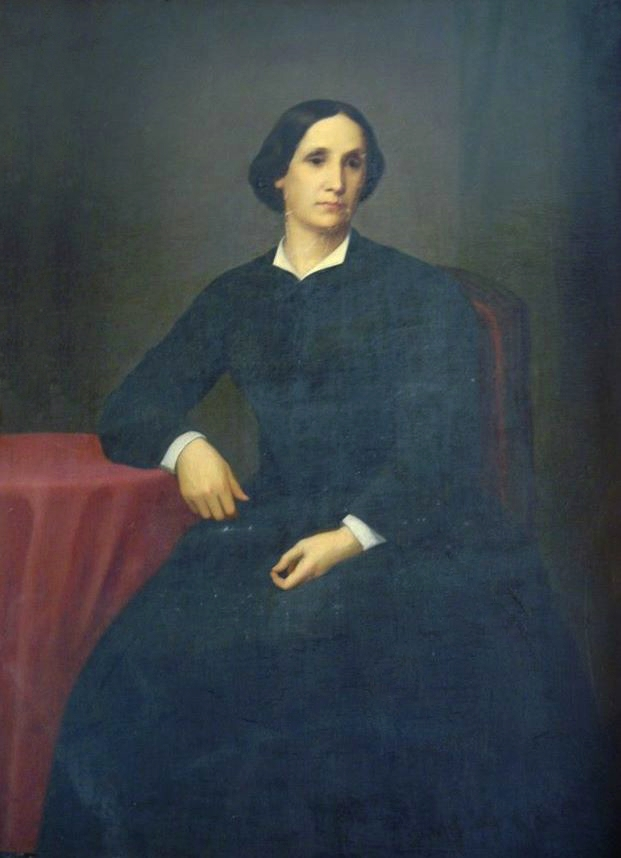
- Mercedes Jijón circa 1840

First Lady of Ecuador
- In office 22 September 1830 – 10 May 1834
- President: Juan José Flores
- Succeeded by: Baltazara Calderón de Rocafuerte
- In office 1 February 1839 – 6 March 1845
- Preceded by: Baltazara Calderón de Rocafuerte
- Succeeded by: María Rosa Icaza

Personal details
- Born: María de las Mercedes Jijón de Vivanco y Chiriboga; 25 March 1811 Otavalo, Real Audiencia of Quito
- Died: 4 June 1878 (aged 67) Quito, Ecuador
- Resting place: Cathedral of Quito
- Spouse: Juan José Flores

María de las Mercedes Jijón de Vivanco y Chiriboga (born 25 March 1811, Otavalo – d. 4 June 1878, Quito) was the first First Lady of Ecuador, serving in that capacity twice alongside her husband, Juan José Flores.

== Life ==
Mercedes Jijón was born in Otavalo, Ecuador, then part of the Real Audiencia of Quito, on 25 March 1811 to the landowner and merchant Antonio Jijón Chiriboga and his wife, Mariana Vivanco Calisto. Mercedes and her ten older siblings were born into a respected and influential, as well as rich, family. Through her father, Mercedes had noble blood from the County of Jijón, which allowed her to launch litigation to claim the title from her cousin, albeit unsuccessfully.

After the Ecuadorian War of Independence and the annexation of the Real Audiencia of Quito into Gran Colombia, the Venezuelan general Juan José Flores was designated Prefect of the Ecuador Department. To legitimize his administration to the people of Ecuador, Flores decide to marry Mercedes, then only 13 years old.

Flores and Jijón were married in the Cathedral of Quito on 21 October 1824 in a ceremony presided over by Archbishop of Quito Nicolás de Arteta y Calisto, their godfather via José Félix Valdivieso. A number of military and political officials were also in attendance, in addition to Jijón's relatives.

== Legacy ==
Floreana Island in the Galápagos Archipelago was renamed Mercedes in her honor, although this was later changed to commemorate her husband instead.

== See also ==
- First ladies and gentlemen of Ecuador
