= Vicente Ramón Roca =

3rd president of the Republic of Ecuador

Don Vicente Ramón Roca Rodríguez
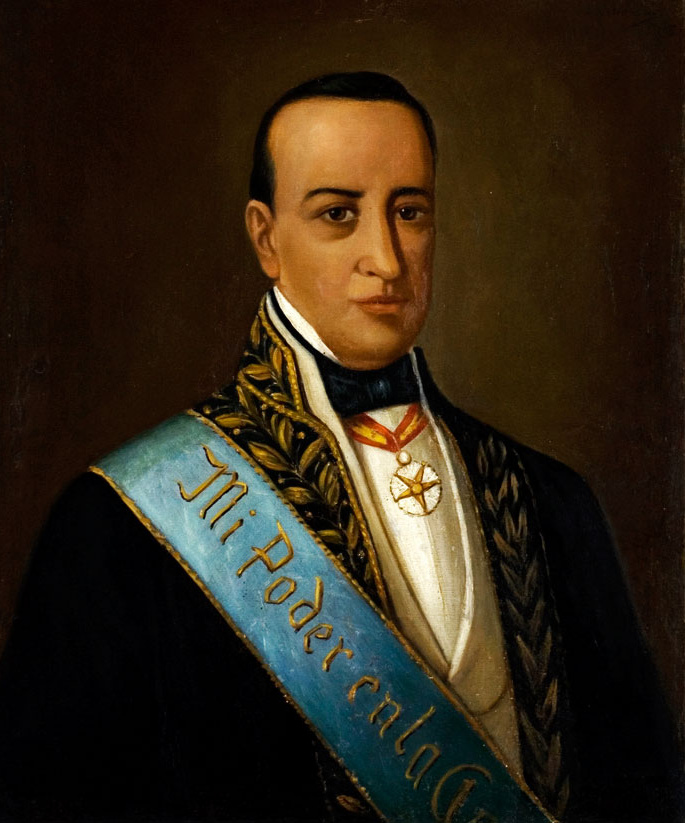

3rd President of Ecuador
- In office 8 December 1845 – 15 October 1849
- Vice President: Pablo Merino (1845–1847); Manuel de Ascásubi (1847–1849)
- Preceded by: José Joaquín de Olmedo
- Succeeded by: Manuel de Ascásubi

Triumvirate President of Ecuador March Revolution (Ecuador)
- In office 6 March 1845 – 8 December 1845 Co-leading with José Joaquín de Olmedo; Diego Noboa
- Preceded by: Created
- Succeeded by: Abolished

4th, 9th, and 13th Governor of Guayas
- In office 1832–1833
- Preceded by: José Joaquín de Olmedo
- Succeeded by: León de Febres Cordero
- In office 1834–1836
- Preceded by: Vicente Rocafuerte
- Succeeded by: Francisco de Paula Ycaza Silva
- In office 1837–1838
- Preceded by: Francisco de Paula Ycaza Silva
- Succeeded by: Ángel de Tola y Salcedo

Personal details
- Born: 2 September 1792 Guayaquil, Real Audiencia of Quito, Spanish Empire (now Ecuador)
- Died: 23 February 1858 (aged 65) Guayaquil, Ecuador
- Resting place: Cementerio General de Guayaquil
- Party: Partido Liberal Radical Ecuatoriano
- Spouse: Juana Andrade y Fuente Fria
- Children: Juan Emilio Roca Andrade; Maria Roca Andrade; Amelia Roca Andrade; Maria de los Angeles Roca Andrade; Juana Roca Andrade
- Parent(s): Ramon Bernardo Roca; Maria Rodriguez Carrascal

Vicente Ramón Roca Rodríguez (2 September 1792 – 23 February 1858) was President of Ecuador from 8 December 1845 to 15 October 1849 as a member of the Liberal Party after leading the March Revolution, alongside José Joaquín de Olmedo and Diego Noboa, overthrowing Juan José Flores. He ruled under the Constitution of 1845.

== Biography ==
=== Early life ===
Roca was born on September 2, 1792, in Guayaquil. His father was Colonel Bernardo Roca and mother was Ignacia Rodríguez. Roca was educated at home. It is unknown if he completed high school and university. He was a merchant, having traveled as far as British Jamaica. He later served as chief of police in Guayaquil and held four terms as a representative and senator for the Republic of Ecuador. He was governor of the Guayas province for three terms, starting in 1836.

=== Spanish American wars of independence ===
Through participation in the Battle of Pichincha, Roca befriended Simón Bolívar and other prominent Gran Colombian politicians who acknowledged Roca for his service as administrator of the Municipal Revenues of Guayaquil. In the days preceding the separation of Gran Colombia, Roca fell out with Bolívar and his loyalist inner circle.

=== March Revolution (Ecuador) ===
Roca was a leader of the March Revolution, a revolt against the presidency of Juan José Flores that marked the start of an Ecuadorian nationalist period. On March 6, 1845, troops led by General Antonio Elizalde seized the cavalry barracks in Guayaquil. A triumvirate provisional government was formed, composed of José Joaquín de Olmedo, Roca, and Diego Noboa, who represented Quito, Guayaquil, and Cuenca respectively.

The provisional government's most urgent tasks were to gain public support, defeat Flores, restore constitutional order, justify the coup d'état, and offer the nation new hope. Between March and June, the triumvirate gained national recognition but was unable to defeat Flores, who had entrenched himself at his estate, La Elvira, near Babahoyo.

The period that followed is called the "Marcista" period, as it began in March. It aimed for Ecuador's independence, but ended in a political crisis, with the country fractured into four sectors. During this period, two civilians, one veteran, and two Creole military officers fought for power. The lower classes, affected by the prior Spanish caste system, had limited political rights and depended on supporting competing local leaders.

Flores eventually decided to negotiate with the provisional government. Flores proposed self-exile in Europe for a few years if the provisional government maintained his military rank, honors, salary, and lands. He requested retroactive pay and a stipend of 20 thousand pesos, equivalent to around $1 million.

=== Constitution of 1845 ===
The provisional government accepted Flores's terms and coined the phrase "To the enemy, a silver bridge." Flores left on June 17, 1845, and simultaneously, the triumvirate convened a constituent assembly to draft a fourth constitution and elect a new national leader. With democracy virtually restored, the reformed government had to justify the March Revolution; José María Cucalón, the general secretary, sent out the "Manifesto of the Provisional Government of Ecuador on the Causes of the Present Transformation," dated July 6, 1845, Year 1 of Liberty.

The 12,000 word document, laid out "the powerful reasons that compelled us to reject the illegal authority that governed us." It stated that "everything in Colombia and Venezuela was national," while "everything in Ecuador was foreign." It invoked the U.S. Constitution and the doctrine of various legal scholars to justify the principle that "the people have the right and duty to shake off the yoke" that oppresses them, referencing Flores's abuse of power.

The manifesto asserted that it was the people of Ecuador, not just people of Guayas, who revolted. It prayed to God to grant the people unity and to keep peace within the government. A new flag was designed, with three vertical stripes—white, sky blue, and white—representing the three regions of the country while symbolizing peace and liberty. The provisional government pushed for change, causing the nation to start to follow the chronology of the French Revolution, counting years since revolution.

Fourteen years later, in year 15 of Liberty, Ecuador, as a sovereign nation and unified country, was losing status, caused by the new constitution. Main provisions of this constitution included:

- Citizenship was granted to those who could read and write, were at least 21 years old, and owned property worth 500 pesos or had a specified income.
- Catholicism became the only recognized faith.
- Intellectual property was guaranteed.
- Slavery was abolished.

== Presidency ==
=== Election and reforms ===
After 76 valid voting rounds, Roca was elected president with 27 votes to 13 for Olmedo. Unsubstantiated allegations of vote-buying arose. Roca formed a cabinet and respected his opposition, despite attacks from various newspapers. However, he firmly opposed supporters of Flores, especially after reports emerged that Flores was preparing for a Spanish reconquest of Ecuador with Queen Maria Christina of the Two Sicilies.

Roca created an agricultural board, introduced juries, and organized the economy. However, government revenues peaked at just 854,435 pesos. This was significantly influenced by the mobilization of Colombian troops against Ecuador and Flores's expedition, a response to the Marcista revolutionaries' project to reclaim territory won by Colombia while Flores was in power. A Peace and Friendship Treaty was signed, which prevented conflict while leaving Ecuador's claim to this territory open.

=== Threat of reconquest ===
Flores wanted revenge for the March Revolution. With financial backing from the bankers of Queen Maria Christina of Spain, he purchased the steamships Monarca and Neptuno and the sailing ship Gleneig in London, hiring 3,000 Spanish, English, and Irish mercenaries.

On October 13, Ecuador received the news of Flores's actions and rewards he would receive from the Spanish government if he successfully regained power in Ecuador. This caused panic in Roca's government; Ecuador's army was put on war footing, with Flores's lands being sold. Years later, Flores denied intention of reconquest.

=== Scandals and life after presidency ===
Roca made enemies while serving in Municipal Revenues; he was accused by Francisco Tamaríz, Minister of Finance under Rocafuerte, of dubious deals which Roca distorted in the press. In 1851, after his party was defeated, he was exiled to Peru while impoverished. Roca worked at his cousin Agustín Roca's trading house upon returning to Guayaquil, where he died at the age of 66.

Political offices
Preceded by José Joaquín de Olmedo	Governor of Guayas Province; 1832 - 1832	Succeeded by León de Febres Cordero
Preceded by José Baquerizo	Governor of Guayas Province; 1832 - 1832	Succeeded by José María Maldonado
Preceded by Vicente Rocafuerte	Governor of Guayas Province; 1834 - 1836	Succeeded by Francisco de Paula de Icaza y Silva
Preceded by Francisco de Paula de Icaza y Silva	Governor of Guayas Province; 1837 - 1838	Succeeded by Ángel de Tola y Salcedo
Preceded by Juan José Flores (President of Ecuador)	Triumvirate of Ecuador; Head of State; 6 March 1845 – 8 December 1845	Succeeded by Self (President of Ecuador)
Preceded by Triumvirate (de facto)	President of Ecuador; 8 December 1845 - 15 October 1849	Succeeded by Manuel de Ascázubi (e)
