= Juana Vallejo =

Ecuadorian politician

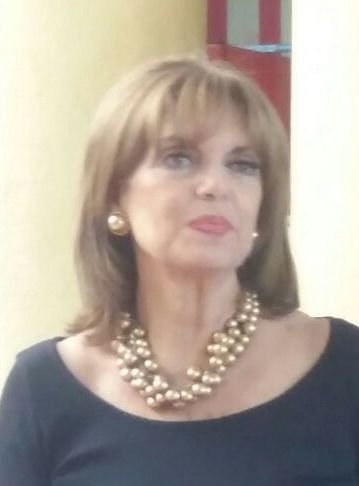

Andean Parliament (For Ecuador)
- In office 2003–2007

Ecuadorian Minister of Tourism
- In office 1997–1998
- Preceded by: Napoleón Ycaza Córdova
- Succeeded by: Isabel Laniado

Governor of Guayas
- In office 1988–1988
- Preceded by: Jaime Nebot
- Succeeded by: Rafael Guerrero Valenzuela

Juana María Vallejo Klaere is an Ecuadorian television producer and politician. She was elected Governor of Guayas Province in 2018.

== Career ==
Vallejo began her career in politics in the 1970s as a community organizer in the Guayaquil neighborhoods of Urdesa and Guasmo. In the latter of these two, she founded the Civic Management Foundation, which she used to build schools, shelters, and day care centers, gradually expanding the influence of the Foundation over other barrios of Guayaquil. Vallejo's work would see her decorated by the city government and she would make an unsuccessful bid for the office of Mayor of Guayaquil. However, her candidacy gave her a media platform that Vallejo used to created public service announcements and hold talk shows.

In 1988, President Rodrigo Borja Cevallos appointed Vallejos Governor of Guayas at a time when the Province was experiencing high levels of crime and violence. However, she would resign in the same year following disagreements over leadership with the President's party, the Democratic Left.

Vallejo was appointed by President Fabián Alarcón to the office of Minister of Tourism, an office she ran from 1997 to 1998. Primary objectives of her term was the establishment of measures and legislature designed at protecting the Galapagos Islands and the increasing of investment of hotel chains in Ecuador.

In 2002, she won a seat in the Andean Parliament for the Social Christian Party from 2003 to 2007, later becoming the vice president of the Parliament. In 2007, Vallejo made an unsuccessful bid to be elected to the Ecuadorian Constituent Assembly.
