= Diego Noboa =

President of Ecuador (1850–1851)

Diego Noboa Arteta
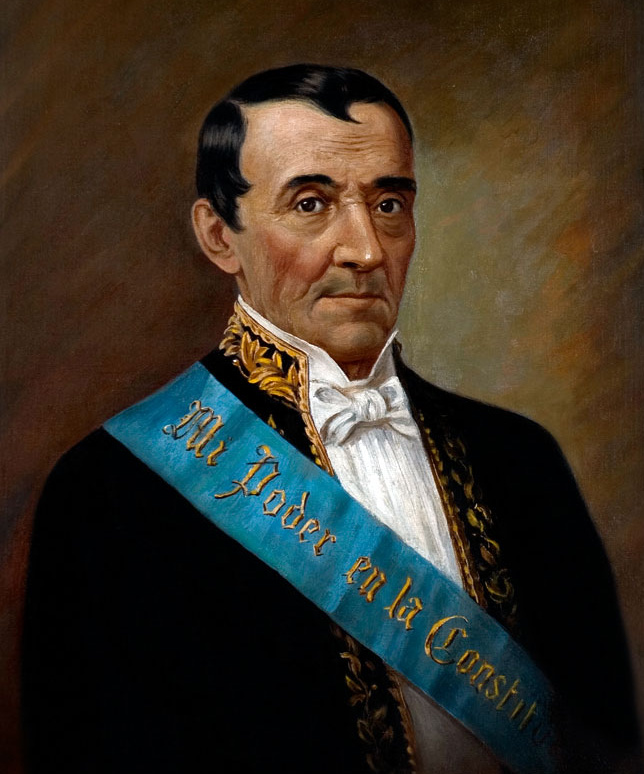

4th President of Ecuador
- In office 26 February 1851 – 12 September 1851
- Vice President: Manuel de Ascásubi
- Preceded by: Himself (as Interim President)
- Succeeded by: José María Urvina

Interim President of Ecuador
- In office 8 December 1850 – 25 February 1851
- Preceded by: Manuel de Ascásubi
- Succeeded by: Himself (as President)

Personal details
- Born: 15 April 1789 Guayaquil, Spanish Empire (now Ecuador)
- Died: 3 November 1870 (aged 81) Guayaquil, Ecuador

Diego de Noboa y Arteta (15 April 1789, in Guayaquil – 3 November 1870) was President of Ecuador from 8 December 1850 to 26 February 1851 (interim) and 26 February 1851 to 17 July 1851. He was President of the Senate in 1839 and 1848.

In 1832, Noboa served as the Ecuadorian Minister Plenipotentiary and was a leading figure in the conclusion of a treaty of friendship with Peru.

By 1845, Noboa was cited, along with two Ecuadorian businessmen José Joaquín de Olmedo and Vicente Ramón Roca, as the founder of the Marcista (March) movement, which drew from the U.S. Declaration of Independence to launch a rebellion. Roca, who became president from 1845 to 1849, engaged in another power struggle with Noboa.

From 1849 to 1851, Noboa's political rivalry with two other figures, Manuel de Ascásubi and Antonio Elizalde resulted in a civil strife. Noboa and Elizalde were described as republicans who supported democracy and liberty while Ascazubi favored more authoritarian policies. This conflict led to the rise of General José María Urvina, who in 1851 dominated the Ecuadorian politics through his presidency (1852-1860) and his influence on the presidency of General Francisco Robles.

Noboa was the great-great-grandfather of Gustavo Noboa Bejarano, who also became Ecuador's president (2000) and vice president under Jamil Mahuad's administration.

Political offices
| Preceded by Manuel de Ascásubi | President of Ecuador; 1850–1851 | Succeeded by José María Urbina |
