= José María Urvina =

President of Ecuador (1852–1856)

José María Urbina
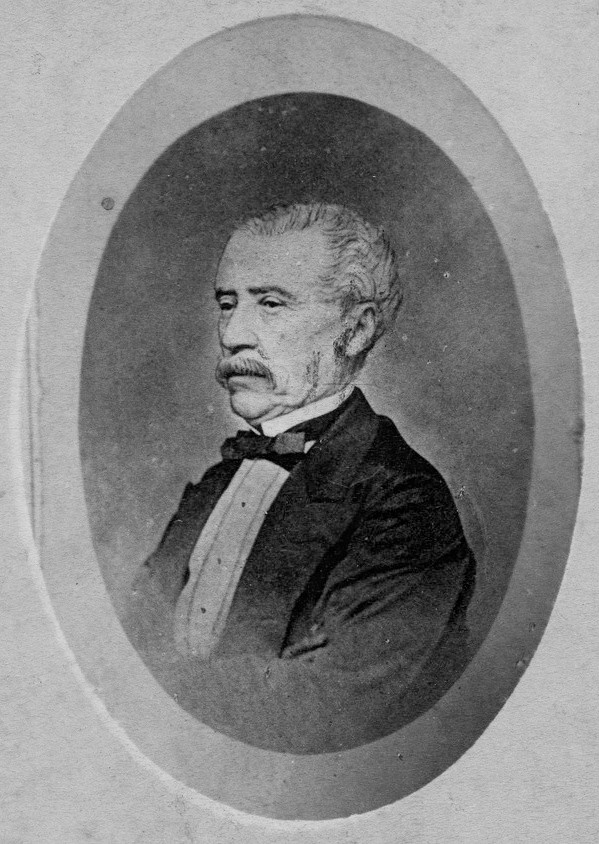

5th President of Ecuador
- In office 6 September 1852 – 16 October 1856
- Vice President: Pacifico Chiriboga (1852–1854); Manuel Bustamante (1854–1856); Marcos Espinel (1856)
- Preceded by: Himself (as Interim President)
- Succeeded by: Francisco Robles

Interim President of Ecuador
- In office 17 July 1852 – 6 September 1852
- Preceded by: Himself (as Supreme Chief)
- Succeeded by: Himself (as President)

Supreme Chief of Ecuador
- In office 24 July 1851 – 17 July 1852
- Preceded by: Diego Noboa
- Succeeded by: Himself (as Interim President)

Personal details
- Born: 19 March 1808 Pillaro, Spanish Empire (now Tungurahua, Ecuador)
- Died: 4 September 1891 (aged 83) Guayaquil, Guayas, Ecuador
- Party: Ecuadorian Radical Liberal Party
- Spouse: Teresa Jado

José María Mariano Segundo de Urvina y Viteri (19 March 1808 – 4 September 1891) was President of Ecuador from 13 July 1851 to 16 October 1856. He was born in Quillan San Migelito (Pillaro-Tungurahua) on 19 March 1808.

== Name spelling ==
The correct spelling of his name has been cause of confusion, since his banker son Francisco Urbina Jado wrote it "Urbina" instead of the original "Urvina".

== Education and career ==
José María Urvina pursued his primary education in the village of his birth. He then attended the Navy School in Guayaquil. He was notorious among his classmates from whom he obtained friendship and consideration.

His competence and courage in the naval combat of Punta de Mapelo rose him above other members of the group. He was the aide-camp of Juan José Flores. In his career he demonstrated his vocation, reaching the degree of General of the Republic.

== Political life ==
- Presidents of the Chamber of Deputies in 1849
- Congressman for the province of Guayas
- Governor of Guayaquil
- Chargé d'Affairs of Ecuador in Bogota
- Supreme Chief from 17 July 1851 to 17 July 1852
- Elaboration of the sixth National Constitution.
- President of Ecuador from 1852 to 1856
- Abolishment of Indian and black slavery in Ecuador, on 25 September 1852.

Political offices
Preceded by Diego Noboa	President of Ecuador; 1851–1856	Succeeded by Francisco Robles
