= Vicente Rocafuerte =

President of the Republic of Ecuador (1834 - 1839)

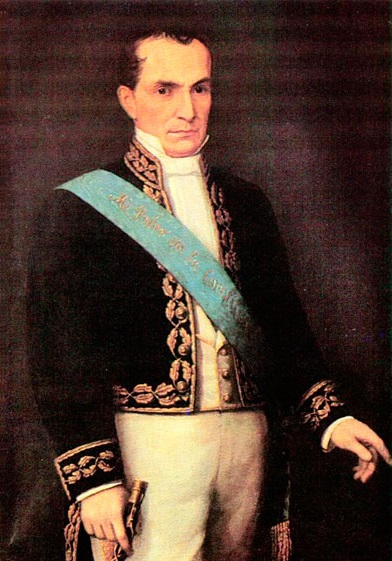

2nd President of Ecuador
- In office 8 August 1835 – 31 January 1839
- Vice President: Juan Bernardo León
- Preceded by: Juan José Flores
- Succeeded by: Juan José Flores

2nd Supreme Chief of the State
- In office 8 June 1835 – 8 August 1835

Supreme Chief of the Department of Guayas
- In office 10 September 1834 – 22 June 1835

Personal details
- Born: 1 May 1783 Guayaquil, Ecuador
- Died: 16 May 1847 (aged 64) Lima, Peru
- Spouse: Baltasara Calderón

Vicente Rocafuerte y Bejarano (1 May 1783 – 16 May 1847) was an influential figure in Ecuadorian politics and President of Ecuador from 10 September 1834 to 31 January 1839.

He was born into an aristocratic family in Guayaquil, Ecuador, and as a youth, was sent to Madrid to finish his education. He also studied in France. He returned to Ecuador in 1807, and committed himself to freeing his land, first from Spanish rule, and later from the Republic of Gran Colombia.

After Ecuadorian independence, Rocafuerte was elected a member of the National Congress for Pichincha Province. He led the opposition to President Juan José Flores, who exiled him to Peru.

Rocafuerte returned, and on 20 September 1833, became Governor of Guayas Province. He revolted against Flores, but was defeated and imprisoned. Because of the respect he was held in by his many supporters, Rocafuerte negotiated a settlement with Flores, and was released from prison. The settlement allowed Flores to finish his term in office, and promised Rocafuerte would become president afterwards, with Flores to head the army.

During his presidency, Rocafuerte passed a new constitution in 1835, and gave greater protection to Native Americans in Ecuador.

In 1839, after Rocafuerte had left office, Flores was again elected president, and for some time there were no difficulties between the two men. However, after electoral irregularities in 1843, Flores annulled the 1835 constitution and passed a new one, called by Rocafuerte 'The Letter of Slavery'. When Flores took up a third term as president in 1843, Rocafuerte left Ecuador in protest. After a short rebellion, Rocafuerte and Vicente Ramón Roca overthrew Flores on 6 March 1845, and Roca became president of Ecuador later that year.

He was President of the Senate in 1846. Under Vicente Ramón Roca's presidency, Rocafuerte was appointed as special representative to various South American countries. He died on 16 May 1847.

Political offices
Preceded by Juan José Flores	President of Ecuador; 1835–1839	Succeeded by Juan José Flores
