= Otto Arosemena =

Ecuadorian politician (1925–1984)

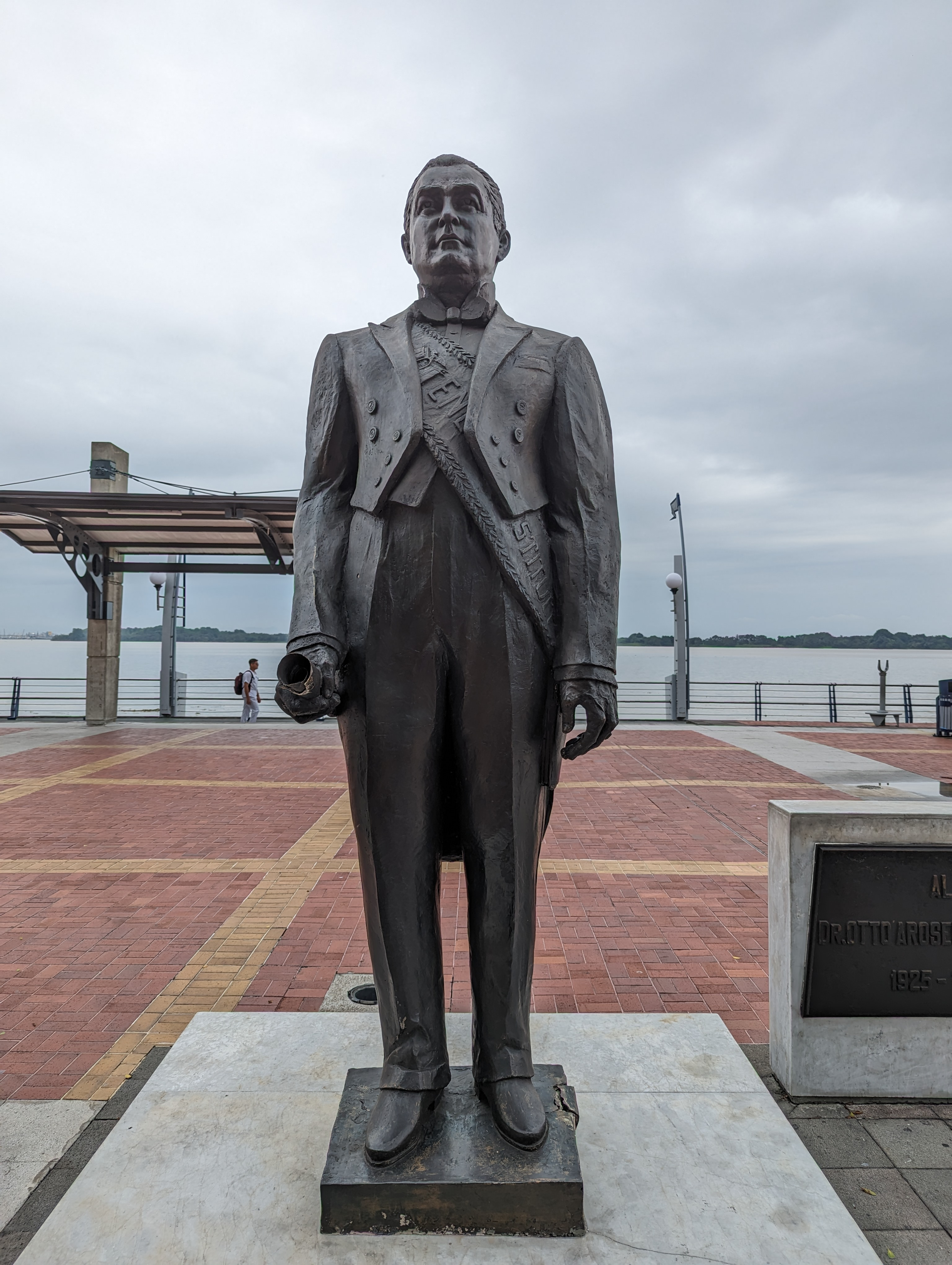
- Monument to Otto Arosemena Gómez

32nd President of Ecuador
- In office 16 November 1966 – 31 August 1968
- Preceded by: Clemente Yerovi
- Succeeded by: José María Velasco Ibarra

Personal details
- Born: 19 July 1925 Guayaquil, Ecuador
- Died: 20 April 1984 (aged 58) Salinas, Ecuador
- Spouse: Lucila Santos Trujillo (m. 1947)
- Education: University of Guayaquil

Otto Arosemena Gómez (19 July 1925 – 20 April 1984) was President of Ecuador from 16 November 1966 to 1 September 1968.

== Early life and career ==
Arosemena was born in Guayaquil to Luis Alberto Arosemena Tola and Mercedes Gómez Santistevan. He came from a well-known Guayaquil family; his cousin and his cousin's father had both previously served as president. He went to elementary school at San José de los Hermanos Cristianos School and to high school at Salesiano Cristóbal Colón High School and Vicente Rocafuerte High School in Guayaquil. He graduated from the University of Guayaquil in 1955 with a degree in law. He was already involved in public life during his education: in 1951, he was named a member of the Electoral Tribunal of Guayas. Later, he became president of the tribunal.

Beginning in 1954, his political ascendancy was vertiginous. In 1954, he was elected Deputy for Guayas Province in the National Congress; he was reelected in 1956. In 1957 he was elected Presidents of the Chamber of Deputies, in 1960 he was elected Senator and member of the Monetary Board on behalf of Congress, and in 1961 he was named President of the Monetary Board and Vice President of the Senate. He fought against the military junta that in July 1963 had overthrown his cousin, President Carlos Julio Arosemena Monroy. In 1965, when the country was facing one of its worst political, social, and economic crises—a result of dictatorial misrule—he founded a new political party in Quito called the Democratic Institutionalist Coalition (Coalición Institucionalista Demócrata, CID). One year later, he was elected Deputy of the Constituent Assembly held by "President" Yerovi Indaburu. The Constituent Assembly elected Arosemena President of Ecuador on 16 November 1966.

== Presidency ==
Arosemena's ascent to power bolstered the confidence that the country had started to enjoy since the beginning of Yerovi's short administration, so that national and foreign investors brought capital and began important negotiations that led to national development. In an attempt to allay concerns about his being a dangerous leftist (as Velasco's vice president he had expressed warm sympathy for Cuban leader Fidel Castro Ruz and made a much- criticized trip to the Soviet Union), Arosemena named a cabinet that included Liberals and even Conservatives and quickly sent former President Galo Plaza on a goodwill trip to Washington.

At the time, Ecuadorians believed that the return to a constitutional regime had brought good luck to their country, when in early March 1967 oil began to flow from Lago Agrio Well #1 in northeast Ecuador.

In this year, Arosemena attended the meeting of Presidents of American states that was held in Punta del Este, Uruguay. At this meeting, he expressed frank opinions with respect to the US policy toward countries of Latin America, and the failure of the Alliance for Progress Program. He was the only attendee who refused to sign the Declaration of American Presidents, because he found it insufficient and lacking in practical content, as was demonstrated years later.

Among the main achievements of his government was the creation of the Ministry of Public Health, the construction of the National Unity Bridge (today called the Rafael Mendoza Avilés Bridge), the expansion of the Manta seaport, the Ambato-Riobamba and El Empalme-Quevedo highways, the electrification of Manabí and the Santa Elena Peninsula, the restoration of the Quito-Guayaquil railroad, and fostering telecommunications. He also carried out a plan of school building—perhaps his most important accomplishment—that at its height resulted in the construction of 1.7 schools per day.

His government, though short, greatly increased Ecuador's development and ensured the consolidation of democracy. In accordance with the law, he called presidential elections, and Velasco Ibarra won for his fifth and final time. Arosemena finished his term on 31 August 1968.

Arosemena's political adversaries later attacked his policies, particularly with respect to oil policy. He responded by writing the book Infamy and Truth (Infamia y verdad), in which he addresses his administration's oil policy.

== Other activities ==
He was a professor of history and political geography at various high schools and universities.

He continued participating in national politics and served as a Deputy or National Representative in Congress until his death from a fall in Salinas in 1984.

Political offices
Preceded by Clemente Yerovi	President of Ecuador; 1966–1968	Succeeded by José María Velasco
