= Manuel de Ascásubi =

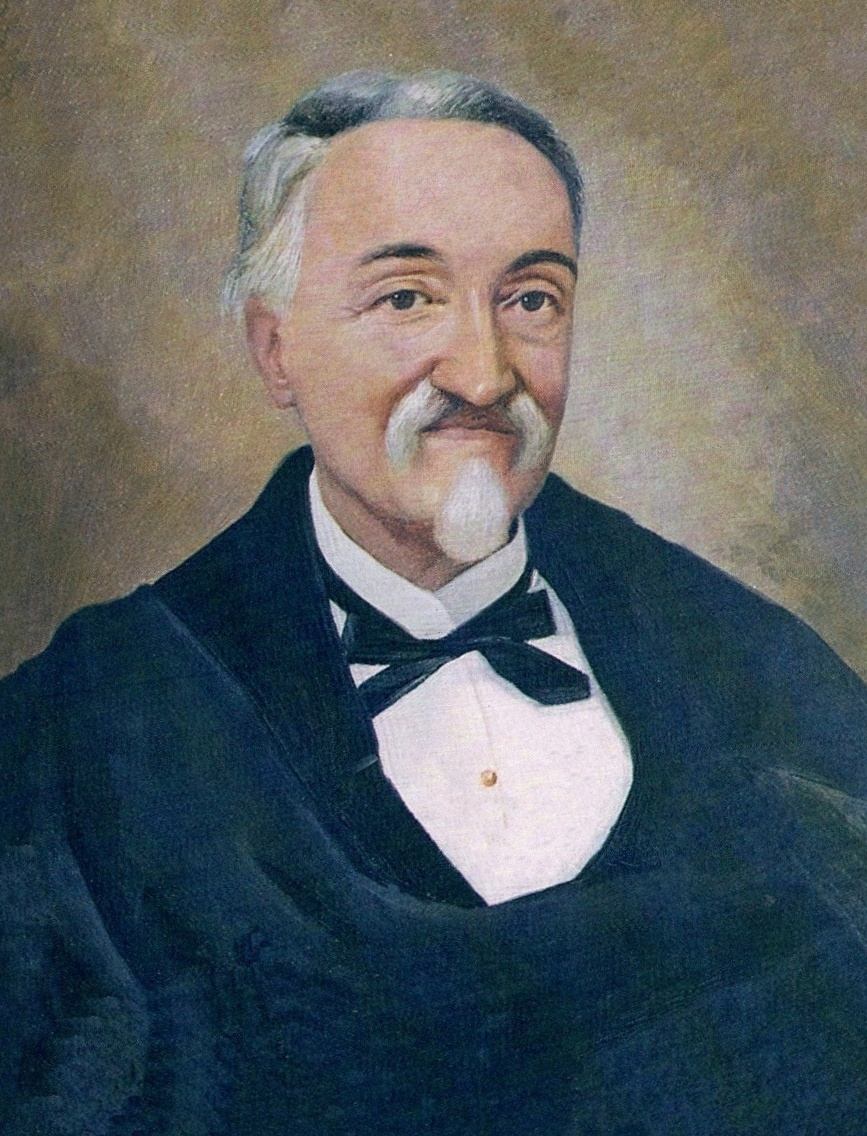

Interim President of Ecuador
- In office 15 October 1849 – 10 June 1850
- Preceded by: Vicente Ramón Roca
- Succeeded by: Diego Noboa

Vice President of Ecuador
- In office 15 September 1847 – 16 October 1849
- Preceded by: Pablo Merino
- Succeeded by: Pacífico Chiriboga
- In office 17 January 1869 – 10 August 1869
- Preceded by: Pedro José de Arteta
- Succeeded by: Gabriel García Moreno

Personal details
- Born: Manuel de Ascázubi y Matheu; 30 December 1804; Quito, Spanish Empire (now Ecuador)
- Died: 25 December 1876 (aged 71); Quito, Ecuador
- Cause of death: Myocardial infarction
- Political party: Conservative Party
- Spouse: Carmen Salinas de la Vega
- Children: 4 daughters

Manuel de Ascázubi y Matheu (30 December 1804 – 25 December 1876) served as Vice President of Ecuador from 1847 to 1849 and in that capacity he was also interim President from 1849 until he was overthrown in a 1850 military coup.

== Biography ==
Don Manuel Ascázubi y Matheu was born in Quito (1804). His parents were Don José de Ascázubi y Matheu and Doña Mariana Matheu y Herrera of Quito, landed aristocracy. Even though he was the heir to the titles of Marques de Maenza and Conde de Puñonrostro, he sided with the promoters of independence from the Spanish crown. He married Carmen Salinas de la Vega, daughter of Juan de Salinas, one the original leaders of the rebellion against Spain. They had four daughters.

Due to his involvement in the independence movement he and his family were persecuted both politically and economically by the royalists.

He was Minister of Finance twice in 1868. He also served as acting president from 16 May 1869 to 10 August 1869.

He was the brother-in-law of President Gabriel García Moreno. He was a member of the Constitutional Assembly and fought to keep certain conservative principles within it. Between August and October 1875 he was the Minister of the Interior and of Foreign affairs.

Manuel de Ascázubi died of a heart attack in Quito on December 25, 1876.

Political offices
Preceded by Pablo Merino	Vice President of Ecuador; 1847–1851	Succeeded by Position abolished
Preceded by Vicente Ramón Roca	President of Ecuador; 1849–1850	Succeeded by Diego Noboa
Preceded by Gabriel García Moreno	President of Ecuador; 1869	Succeeded by Gabriel García Moreno
