= Cabinet of Guillermo Lasso =

2021–2023 cabinet in Ecuador

- 92nd Cabinet of Ecuador

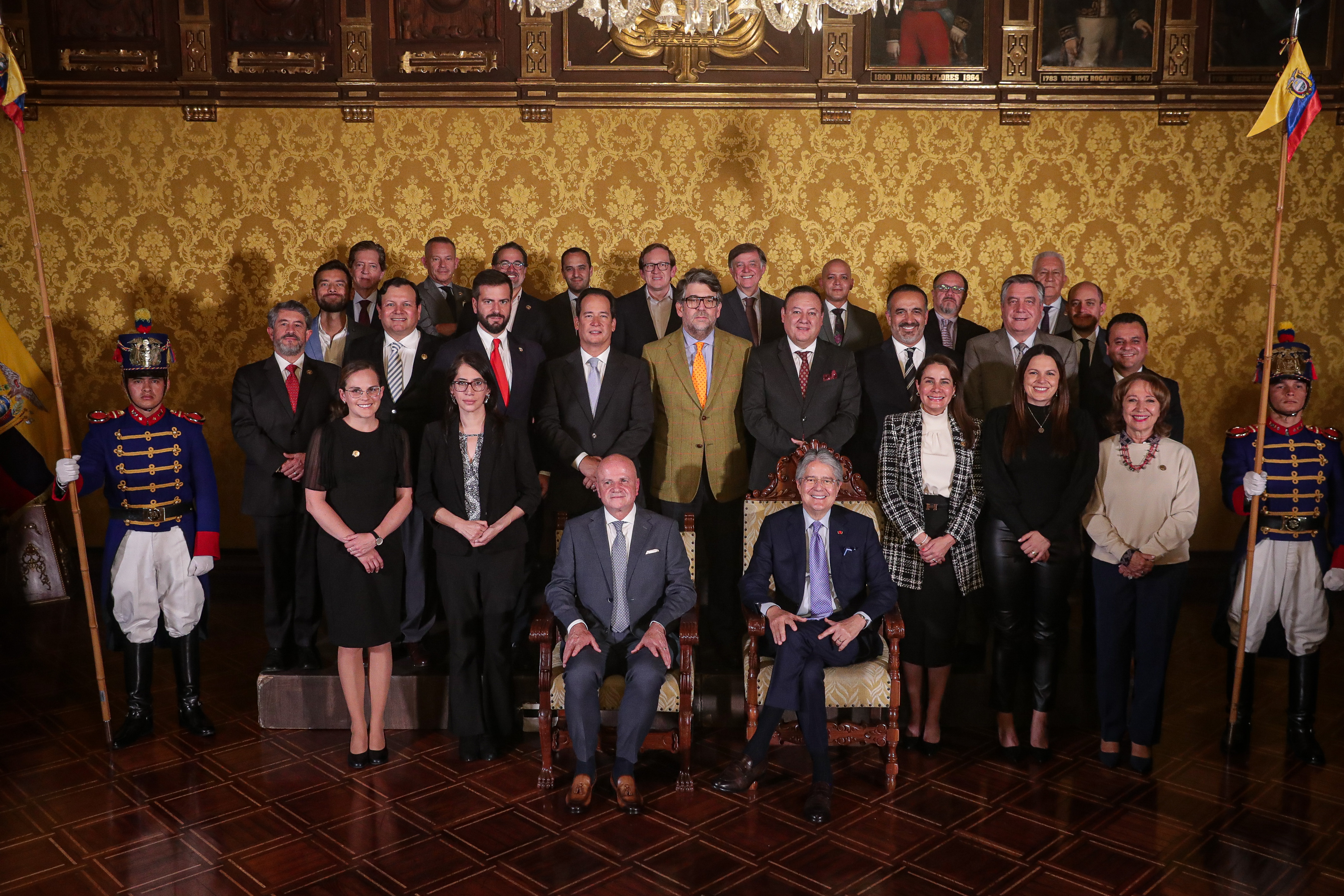
- Date formed: 24 May 2021
- Date dissolved: 23 November 2023

People and organisations
- President: Guillermo Lasso
- Vice President: Alfredo Borrero
- Total no. of members: 44

History
- Election: 2021
- Predecessor: Moreno
- Successor: Noboa I

The Cabinet of Guillermo Lasso was formed in 2021.

== Members ==
Portfolio	Minister	Took office	Left office	Party	Ref
President	Guillermo Lasso	24 May 2021	23 November 2023	CREO	-
Vice President	Alfredo Borrero	24 May 2021	23 November 2023	CREO	-
Ministry of Agriculture and Livestock	Tanlly Vera	24 May 2021	15 September 2021	CREO	-
Ministry of Agriculture and Livestock	Pedro Álava González	15 September 2021	4 May 2022	Independent	-
Ministry of Agriculture and Livestock	Bernardo Manzano	4 May 2022	19 February 2023	Independent	-
Ministry of Agriculture and Livestock	Eduardo Izaguirre	19 February 2023	23 November 2023	Independent	-
Ministry of Environment, Water and Ecological Transition	Gustavo Manrique	24 May 2021	2 April 2023	Independent	-
Ministry of Environment, Water and Ecological Transition	Pedro Álava González	2 April 2023	23 November 2023	Independent	-
Ministry of Culture and Heritage	María Elena Machuca Merino	24 May 2021	23 November 2023	Independent	-
Ministry of National Defense	Fernando Donoso Morán	24 May 2021	18 October 2021	Military	-
Ministry of National Defense	Luis Bolívar Hernández Peñaherrera	18 October 2021	26 April 2022	Military	-
Ministry of National Defense	Luis Lara Jaramillo	26 April 2022	23 November 2023	Military	-
Ministry of Sports	Sebastián Palacios Muñoz	24 May 2021	23 November 2023	SUMA Party	-
Ministry of Urban Development and Housing	Darío Herrera Falcones	24 May 2021	5 July 2022	Independent	-
Ministry of Urban Development and Housing	María Gabriela Aguilera Jaramillo	5 July 2022	23 November 2023	Independent	-
Ministry of Economy and Finance	Simón Cueva Armijos	24 May 2021	5 July 2022	Independent	-
Ministry of Economy and Finance	Pablo Arosemena Marriott	5 July 2022	23 November 2023	CREO	-
Ministry of Education	María Brown Pérez	24 May 2021	23 November 2023	Independent	-
MMinister of Energy and Mines	Juan Carlos Bermeo Calderón	24 May 2021	28 April 2022	Independent	-
MMinister of Energy and Mines	Xavier Vera Grunauer	28 April 2022	28 October 2022	Independent	-
MMinister of Energy and Mines	Fernando Santos Alvite	28 October 2022	23 November 2023	Independent	-
Ministry of Government	César Monge	24 May 2021	14 July 2022	CREO	-
Ministry of Government	Alexandra Vela	14 July 2022	30 March 2022	UDC	-
Ministry of Government	Francisco Jiménez Sánchez	30 March 2022	9 February 2023	CREO	-
Ministry of Government	Henry Cucalón	9 February 2023	23 November 2023	Independent	-
Ministry of the Interior	Patricio Carrillo Rosero	30 March 2022	26 September 2022	Construye	-
Ministry of the Interior	Juan Zapata Silva	26 September 2022	23 November 2023	Independent	-
Ministry of Economic and Social Inclusion	Mae Montaño	24 May 2021	15 September 2021	Independent	-
Ministry of Economic and Social Inclusion	Esteban Bernal Bernal	15 September 2021	23 November 2023	CREO	-
Ministry of Women and Human Rights	Bernarda Ordóñez	24 May 2021	5 May 2022	CREO	-
Ministry of Women and Human Rights	Paola Flores Jaramillo	5 May 2022	23 November 2023	CREO	-
Ministry of Industry and Productivity	Julio José Prado	24 May 2021	3 July 2023	Independent	-
Ministry of Industry and Productivity	Daniel Legarda Touma	3 July 2023	23 November 2023	Independent	-
Ministry of Foreign Affairs and Human Mobility	Mauricio Montalvo Samaniego	24 May 2021	3 January 2022	Independent	-
Ministry of Foreign Affairs and Human Mobility	Juan Carlos Holguín	3 January 2022	2 April 2023	CREO	-
Ministry of Foreign Affairs and Human Mobility	Gustavo Manrique	2 April 2023	23 November 2023	Independent	-
Ministry of Public Health	Ximena Garzón	24 May 2021	7 July 2022	Independent	-
Ministry of Public Health	José Leonardo Ruales Estupiñan	7 July 2022	23 November 2023	Independent	-
Ministry of Labor	Patricio Donoso	24 May 2021	23 November 2023	CREO	-
Ministry of Transportation and Public Works	Marcelo Cabrera	24 May 2021	5 July 2022	Independent	-
Ministry of Transportation and Public Works	Darío Herrera Falcones	5 July 2022	24 May 2023	Independent	-
Ministry of Transportation and Public Works	César Rohon	24 May 2023	23 November 2023	Independent	-
Ministry of Tourism	Niels Olsen Peet	24 May 2021	23 November 2023	Independent	-
Ministry of Telecommunications	Vianna Maino Isaias	24 May 2021	23 November 2023	Independent	-
