= List of ambassadors of Ecuador to Peru =

Ambassador of Ecuador to Peru
- Formation: 19th century

The Ecuadorian ambassador in Lima is the official representative of the Government in Quito to the government of Peru.

As a result of the dissolution of the Republic of Colombia, the State of Ecuador was established in 1830, having been preceded by Peru in 1821. Both countries established relations in 1831, with their first treaties being signed the following year. Both countries have maintained their relations since, with one exception from 1858 to 1860, as a result of the first Ecuadorian–Peruvian War (despite the second Ecuadorian–Peruvian War in 1941, Peru and Ecuador did not sever diplomatic relations).

The dispute ended with the 1998 Brasilia Presidential Act, and relations have stabilized since.

== List of representatives ==
Name	Portrait	Term begin	Term end	President	Notes
Vicente Piedrahíta		October 1864	?	Gabriel García Moreno	
Pedro Moncayo					
Alfredo Baquerizo					
Jorge Salvador Lara					
Gonzalo Escudero		1956	1956	José María Velasco Ibarra	
Luis Valencia Rodríguez		1974	1978	Guillermo Rodríguez Lara	
José Ayala Lasso		1997	1998	Rosalía Arteaga	Signatory of the Brasilia Presidential Act that ended the Ecuadorian–Peruvian territorial dispute.
Horacio Sevilla				Jamil Mahuad	
Luis Narváez Rivadeneira			2005	Lucio Gutiérrez	
Luis Valencia Rodríguez		2005	2006	Alfredo Palacio	
Diego Ribadeneira Espinosa		2007	2012	Rafael Correa	
Rodrigo Guillermo Riofrío Machuca		2012	2013	Rafael Correa	
José Ramiro Sandoval Zambrano		2014	2019	Rafael Correa	
Eva García Fabre		March 8, 2019	2021	Lenín Moreno	
Galo Yépez Holguín		2021	2023	Guillermo Lasso	

== See also ==
- List of ambassadors of Peru to Ecuador
