= Luis Valencia =

Luis Valencia may refer to:

- Luis Valencia Avaria (1917–1990), Chilean historian
- Luis Valencia Courbis (1883–1954), Chilean lawyer and politician
- Luis Valencia Rodríguez (1926–2022), Ecuadorian jurist, diplomat, academic and writer
- Luis Antonio Valencia (born 1985), Ecuadorian footballer
