= List of ambassadors of Ecuador to the Holy See =

Coordinates: 39.939175°N 116.451817°E

Ambassador of Ecuador to the Holy See
- Inaugural holder: José Ignacio Ordóñez
- Formation: 1861

The Ecuadorian ambassador next the Holy See is the official representative of the Government in Quito to the subject of international right the Holy See.

== List of representatives ==
| Diplomatic agrément/Diplomatic accreditation | Ambassador | Observations | President of Ecuador | List of popes | Term end |
|---|---|---|---|---|---|
| 1861 | José Ignacio Ordóñez | minister, obispo de Riobamba y arzobispo de Quito (1882) | Gabriel García Moreno | Pope Pius IX | 1863 |
| 1866 | Fernando Lorenzana | minister Alvaro Fernando de Lorenzana, Marqués de Belmonte | Jerónimo Carrión | Pope Pius IX | 1868 |
| 1869 | Vicente Daniele Pastor | Chargé d'affaires | Gabriel García Moreno | Pope Pius IX | 1877 |
| 1878 | Fernando Lorenzana | envoy, Alvaro Fernando de Lorenzana, Marqués de Belmonte | Ignacio de Veintemillalspan | Pope Leo XIII | 1887 |
| 1887 | Antonio Flores (envoy) | envoy | Luis Cordero Crespo | Pope Leo XIII | 1888 |
| 1888 | Leonidas A. Larrea | Chargé d'affaires | Antonio Flores Jijón | Pope Leo XIII | 1891 |
| 1891 | Leonidas A. Larrea | Resident minister | Antonio Flores Jijón | Pope Leo XIII | 1893 |
| 1893 | Leonidas A. Larrea | envoy | Luis Cordero Crespo | Pope Leo XIII | 1897 |
| 1938 | Giovanni Modesto Larrea Jijón | envoy | Manuel María Borrero | Pope Pius XI | 1939 |
| 1939 | Armando Guzmán y Aspiazu | envoy, Lisímaco Armando Guzmán Aspiazu, n. Guayaquil 28-VI-1883, f. 27- VIII-1960; diplomático, Attaché de la Legación del Ecuador en Londres, Secretario y luego Encargado de Negocios en Bruselas, Ministro y luego Embajador en la Santa ... 17-XII-1914, notable abogado, Ministro Plenipotenciario del Ecuador en el Perú, miembro fundador de la | Luis Cordero Crespo | Pope Pius XII | 1944 |
| 1944 | Manuel Sotomayor Luna | ambassador, Ecuador Manuel Sotomayor Luna (ambassador, 27 December 1944). *Sr. Sotomayor Luna is a former Minister for Foreign Affairs of Ecuador, who was appointed minister in London and Paris in 1939. He had arranged to come to London in | José María Velasco Ibarra | Pope Pius XII | 1948 |
| 1948 | Carlo Emanuele Larrea | | Galo Plaza Lasso | Pope Pius XII | 1951 |
| 1951 | César Coloma Silva | Cesar Coloma Silva (24 April 1901) presented his credentials as minister on 25 August 1944. Dr. Coloma Silva entered the diplomatic service in 1928, and was serving as secretary in Lima when I came here in 1934. This is his first post as Minister, César Coloma Silva, Nació en Quito, Ecuador, el 24 de abril de 1901. Es casado con la, diplomatico, hijas: 1} Alicia Coloma Mena, cc. Francisco Reed Borja, hijos: A. - Carolina Reed Coloma B. - Alexander 1) Magdalena Colema Mena, cl9c. Diego Moncayo Pérez, div.cs. c2»c. Francisco | Galo Plaza Lasso | Pope Pius XII | 1952 |
| 2 July 1952 | Luigi Alfonso Ortiz Bilbao | Luigi Alfonso Ortiz Bilbao, nuovo ambasciatore straordinario e plenipotenziario della Repubblica dell'Equatore, il 2 luglio, fu ricevuto in udienza solenne dal Sommo Pontefice. Nell'atto di consegnare le lettere che l'accreditavano nell'alto | José María Velasco Ibarra | Pope Pius XII | 1956 |
| 1957 | Rafael León Larrea | (* Quito en 1898, m. en Montevideo 12 enero de 1972), fue Diputado, Concejal, Miembro de la Junta Consultiva de RR. | Camilo Ponce Enríquez | Pope Pius XII | 1960 |
| 1962 | Alberto Coloma-Silva | | Carlos Julio Arosemena Monroy | Pope John XXIII | 1965 |
| 1965 | Enrique Ponce y Carbo | Enrique Ponce y Carbo — Born: 1917. Admitted: 1941 | Ramón Castro Jijón | Pope Paul VI | 1967 |
| 1968 | Enrique Arízaga Toral | Enrique Arízaga Toral, (* en Cuenca 3 December 1903, + En Cuenca el 30 April 1985 ) financista, diputado, senador | José María Velasco Ibarra | Pope Paul VI | 1968 |
| 1969 | Luis Antonio Peñaherrera | | José María Velasco Ibarra | Pope Paul VI | 1973 |
| 1974 | Clemente Yerovi | Clemente Yerovi Indaburu | Guillermo Rodríguez Lara | Pope Paul VI | 1976 |
| 1976 | Ernesto Valdivieso Chiriboga | | Alfredo Poveda Burbano | Pope Paul VI | 1979 |
| 1979 | Teodoro Bustamante | | Jaime Roldós | Pope John Paul II | 1981 |
| 1981 | Manuel De Guzmán Polanco | | Osvaldo Hurtado | Pope John Paul II | 1983 |
| 1983 | Jorge Salvador Lara | | Osvaldo Hurtado | Pope John Paul II | 1984 |
| 1984 | Francisco Alfredo Salazar Alvarado | | León Febres Cordero | Pope John Paul II | 1989 |
| 1989 | Andrés Cárdenas Monge | | Rodrigo Borja | Pope John Paul II | 1992 |
| 1993 | Galo Alberto Leoro Franco | | Sixto Durán Ballén | Pope John Paul II | 1994 |
| 1994 | Galo Andrés Yepez Holguín | Chargé d'affaires | Sixto Durán Ballén | Pope John Paul II | 1995 |
| 1995 | Marcelo Santos Vera | Marcelo Santos Vera | Sixto Durán Ballén | Pope John Paul II | 1996 |
| 1997 | Alfredo Luna Tobar | | Fabián Alarcón | Pope John Paul II | 1999 |
| 1999 | José Ayala Lasso | José Ayala Lasso | Jamil Mahuad | Pope John Paul II | 3 September 2001 |
| 2002 | Marcelo Fernández de Córdoba Ponce | | Gustavo Noboa | Pope John Paul II | 2004 |
| 2005 | Francisco Alfredo Salazar Alvarado | | Alfredo Palacio | Pope Benedict XVI | 2006 |
| 2006 | Cristian Mancheno Egas | Chargé d'affaires | Alfredo Palacio | Pope Benedict XVI | 2007 |
| 2007 | Fausto Cordovez | Fausto Cordovez Chiriboga | Rafael Correa | Pope Benedict XVI | 2009 |
| 2009 | Dominika Orfelina Mejía Lachowicz | Chargé d'affaires | Rafael Correa | Pope Benedict XVI | 2010 |
| 2010 | Luis Dositeo Latorre Tapia | | Rafael Correa | Pope Benedict XVI | 2017 |
| 2017 | José Luis Álvarez Palacio | | Lenín Moreno | Pope Francis | 2021 |
