= List of ambassadors of Ecuador to the European Union =

Coordinates: 50.821185°N 4.369284°E

Ambassador of Ecuador to the European Commission
- Inaugural holder: Clemente Yerovi
- Formation: February 14, 1964

The Ecuadorian ambassador next the European Commission is the official representative of the Government in Quito to the European Commission. He is concurrently accredited to the government of Bélgium, the government in the Hague Netherlands, in Paris and the UNESCO.

== List of representatives ==
Diplomatic agrément/Diplomatic accreditation	Ambassador	Observations	President of Ecuador	President of the European Commission	Term end
February 14, 1964	Clemente Yerovi	Clemente Yeroui Indaburu	Ramón Castro Jijón	Walter Hallstein	
October 5, 1971	Antonio José Lucio Paredes		José María Velasco Ibarra	Franco Maria Malfatti	
June 13, 1973	Armando Pesantes García		Guillermo Rodríguez Lara	François-Xavier Ortoli	
December 17, 1979	José Ayala Lasso	(Ecuador) (b. 1932) 15 Mar 1997 - 12 Sep 1997	Jaime Roldós	Roy Jenkins	
December 15, 1983	Hernán Guarderas Iturralde		Osvaldo Hurtado	Gaston Thorn	
June 4, 1987	Diego Paredes Peña		León Febres Cordero	Jacques Delors	
May 6, 1989	Xavier Pérez Martínez		Rodrigo Borja	Jacques Delors	
October 14, 1993	Louis Orrantia Gonzalez		Sixto Durán Ballén	Jacques Delors	
May 21, 1997	Alfredo Pinoargote Cevallos		Fabián Alarcón	Jacques Santer	
April 18, 2002	Méntor Villagómez Merino		Gustavo Noboa	Romano Prodi	
June 11, 2007	Fernando Yépez Lasso		Rafael Correa	José Manuel Barroso	
July 23, 2014	Pablo Villagómez Reinel		Rafael Correa	Jean-Claude Juncker	
April 30, 2019	Pablo Ortiz García		Lenín Moreno	Jean-Claude Juncker	2021
