= List of ministers of foreign affairs of Ecuador =

The following is a list of ministers of foreign affairs of Ecuador since 1830, when Ecuador achieved independence after the dissolution of Gran Colombia.

== Ministers ==
- 1830: Esteban Febres Cordero
- 1830–1833: José Félix Valdivieso
- 1833–1834: Víctor Félix de San Miguel
- 1834–1835: Manuel Ignacio Pareja
- 1835–1838: José Miguel González y Alminati
- 1839–1843: Francisco Marcos
- 1843–1845: Benigno Malo
- 1845: José María Cucalón
- 1845: Pedro Carbo
- 1845: José María Urbina
- 1846–1847: José Fernández Salvador
- 1847–1849: Manuel Gómez de la Torre
- 1849: Pablo Vásconez
- 1849–1850: Benigno Malo
- 1850: Rafael Carvajal
- 1850–1851: Luis de Saá
- 1851: José Modesto Larrea
- 1851–1852: José de Villamil
- 1852: Javier Espinoza
- 1852: Pedro Fermín Cevallos
- 1852–1855: Marcos Espinel
- 1855: Pacífico Chiriboga
- 1855–1856: Ramón Borja
- 1856–1858: Antonio Mata
- 1858: Marcos Espinel
- 1859: Camilo Ponce
- 1859–1861: Roberto Ascásubi
- 1861–1864: Rafael Carvajal
- 1864–1865: Pablo Herrera
- 1865–1867: Manuel Bustamante
- 1867–1868: Rafael Carvajal
- 1868–1869: Camilo Ponce
- 1869: Rafael Carvajal
- 1869: Pablo Herrera
- 1869–1870: Francisco Javier Salazar
- 1870–1875: Francisco Javier León
- 1875: Manuel de Ascásubi
- 1875: Rafael Pólit
- 1875–1876: Manuel Gómez de la Torre
- 1876: Agustín Guerrero
- 1877–1878: Pedro Carbo
- 1878–1879: Julio Castro
- 1879–1881: Cornelio Vernaza
- 1881–1883: Francisco Arias
- 1883–1888: José Modesto Espinosa
- 1888: Elías Lasso
- 1888–1889: Francisco Javier Salazar
- 1889: Carlos R. Tobar
- 1890–1891: Francisco Javier Salazar
- 1891: Pedro José Cevallos
- 1891–1892: Agustín Guerrero
- 1892–1893: Honorato Vázquez
- 1893: Vicente Lucio Salazar
- 1893: Pedro Ignacio Lizarzaburu
- 1894–1895: Pablo Herrera
- 1895: Luis Salvador
- 1895: Aparicio Ribadeneira
- 1895: Luis F. Carbo
- 1895–1896: Ignacio Robles
- 1896: Francisco J. Montalvo
- 1896: Leonidas Pallares Arteta
- 1896: José de Lapierre
- 1896–1897: Rafael Gómez de la Torre
- 1897: Belisario Albán Mestanza
- 1897–1898: Rafael Gómez de la Torre
- 1898–1901: José Peralta
- 1901: Julio Arias
- 1901–1903: Alfredo Baquerizo Moreno
- 1903–1905: Miguel Valverde
- 1906: Manuel Montalvo
- 1906–1907: Pacífico Villagómez
- 1907–1908: Luis F. Carbo
- 1908: Alfredo Monge
- 1908–1909: César Borja Lavayen
- 1909–1910: Francisco X. Aguirre Jado
- 1910–1911: José Peralta
- 1911: Juan Francisco Freile Z.
- 1911–1912: Carlos R. Tobar
- 1912: Antonio E. Arcos
- 1912–1913: Cesareo Carrera
- 1913–1914: Luis Napoleón Dillon
- 1914–1916: Rafael H. Elizalde
- 1916–1919: Carlos M. Tobar Borgoño
- 1919–1920: Augusto Aguirre Aparicio
- 1920–1924: N. Clemente Ponce
- 1924: José Rafael Bustamante
- 1924–1925: Alberto Larrea Chiriboga
- 1925: Camilo Octavio Andrade
- 1925: José Rafael Bustamante
- 1926–1929: Homero Viteri Lafronte
- 1929–1931: Gonzalo Zaldumbide
- 1931: Modesto Larrea Jijón
- 1931–1932: Carlos Manuel Larrea
- 1932: Caton Cárdenas
- 1932–1933: Antonio J. Quevedo
- 1933: Francisco Guarderas
- 1933: Manuel Cabeza de Vaca
- 1933–1934: José Gabriel Navarro
- 1934: Manuel Sotomayor y Luna
- 1934–1935: Alejandro Ponce Borja
- 1935–1936: Ángel Isaac Chiriboga
- 1936–1938: Carlos Manuel Larrea
- 1938: Luis Bossano
- 1938–1942: Julio Tobar Donoso
- 1942–1944: Francisco Guarderas
- 1944–1945: Camilo Ponce Enríquez
- 1945–1947: José Vicente Trujillo
- 1947–1948: Antonio Parra Velasco
- 1948–1952: Neftalí Ponce Miranda
- 1952–1953: Teodoro Alvarado Garaicoa
- 1953: Arturo Borrero Bustamante
- 1953–1955: Luis Antonio Peñaherrera
- 1955–1956: Rafael Arizaga Vega
- 1956: Jorge Villagómez Yépez
- 1956–1960: Carlos Tobar Zaldumbide
- 1960–1961: José Ricardo Chiriboga Villagómez
- 1961: Wilson Vela Hervas
- 1961–1962: Francisco Acosta Yépez
- 1962–1963: Benjamín Peralta Páez
- 1963–1964: Neftalí Ponce Miranda
- 1964–1965: Gonzalo Escudero Moscoso
- 1965: Wilson Córdova Moscoso
- 1965–1966: Luis Valencia Rodríguez
- 1966: Jorge Salvador Lara
- 1966–1967: Jorge Carrera Andrade
- 1967–1968: Julio Prado Vallejo
- 1968: Gustavo Larrea Córdova
- 1968–1970: Rogelio Valdivieso Eguiguren
- 1970–1971: José María Ponce Yépez
- 1971–1972: Rafael García Velasco
- 1972–1975: Antonio José Lucio Paredes
- 1975–1976: Carlos Aguirre Asanza
- 1976: Armando Pesantes García
- 1976–1977: Jorge Salvador Lara
- 1977–1979: José Ayala Lasso
- 1979–1980: Alfredo Pareja Diezcanseco
- 1980–1981: Alfonso Barrera Valverde
- 1981–1984: Luis Valencia Rodríguez
- 1984–1987: Édgar Terán Terán
- 1987–1988: Rafael García Velasco
- 1988–1992: Diego Cordovez Zegers
- 1992–1994: Diego Paredes Peña
- 1994–1997: Galo Leoro Franco
- 1997–1999: José Ayala Lasso
- 1999–2000: Benjamín Ortiz Brennan
- 2000–2003: Heinz Moeller Freile
- 2003: Nina Pacari
- 2003–2005: Patricio Zuquilanda
- 2005: Antonio Parra Gil
- 2005–2007: Francisco Carrión
- 2007: María Fernanda Espinosa
- 2007–2008: María Isabel Salvador
- 2008–2010: Fander Falconí
- 2010: Lautaro Pozo Malo (acting)
- 2010–2016: Ricardo Patiño
- 2016–2017: Guillaume Long
- 2017–2018: María Fernanda Espinosa
- 2018–2020: José Valencia Amores
- 2020–2021: Luis Gallegos
- 2021: Manuel Mejía Dalmau
- 2021: Mauricio Montalvo Samaniego
- 2022: Juan Carlos Holguín
- 2023: Gustavo Manrique Miranda
- 2023: Gabriela Sommerfeld

== Sources ==
- Rulers.org – Foreign ministers E–K
