= Gustavo Manrique =

Ecuadorian agricultural engineer, environmental activist and environmentalist

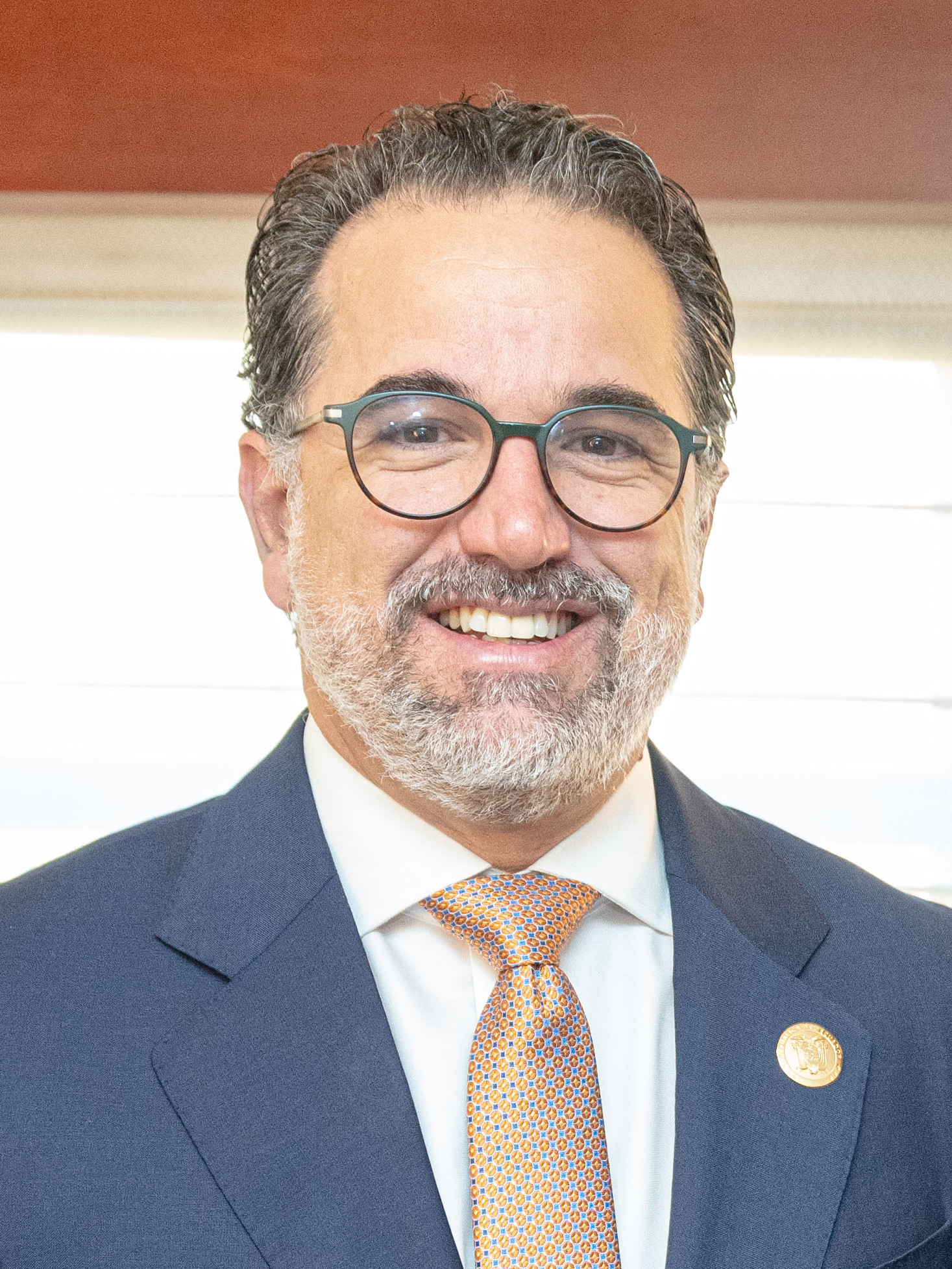
- Born: 1972 (age 53–54); Guayaquil, Ecuador
- Education: EARTH University
- Occupations: Agricultural engineer and environmental activist
- Awards: Guinness World Record for the largest recycling of bottles in the city of Quito

Gustavo Manrique Miranda (born 1972) is an Ecuadorian agricultural engineer, environmental activist and environmentalist who served in a number of ministerial roles in the Government of Guillermo Lasso.

== Biography ==
He was born in the city of Guayaquil. He is the son of Xavier Manrique and Clemencia Miranda. His father was a renowned Ecuadorian cardiologist and his mother is a dedicated educator. He has 5 brothers, one of them is the model and actor Roberto Manrique.

He graduated as an agricultural engineer in Costa Rica at EARTH University. During his professional career he worked in several socio-environmental and agricultural companies. He also chaired several boards of environmental organizations.

He promoted activities such as the International Environment Summit, founded the Green Latin America Awards and in 2012 obtained the first Guinness World Record for the city of Quito, by recycling one and a half million bottles in 6 days together with 93,000 students. In 2021 he was considered as one of the 100 most influential climate change leaders in Latin America.

== Career ==
=== Minister of the Environment ===
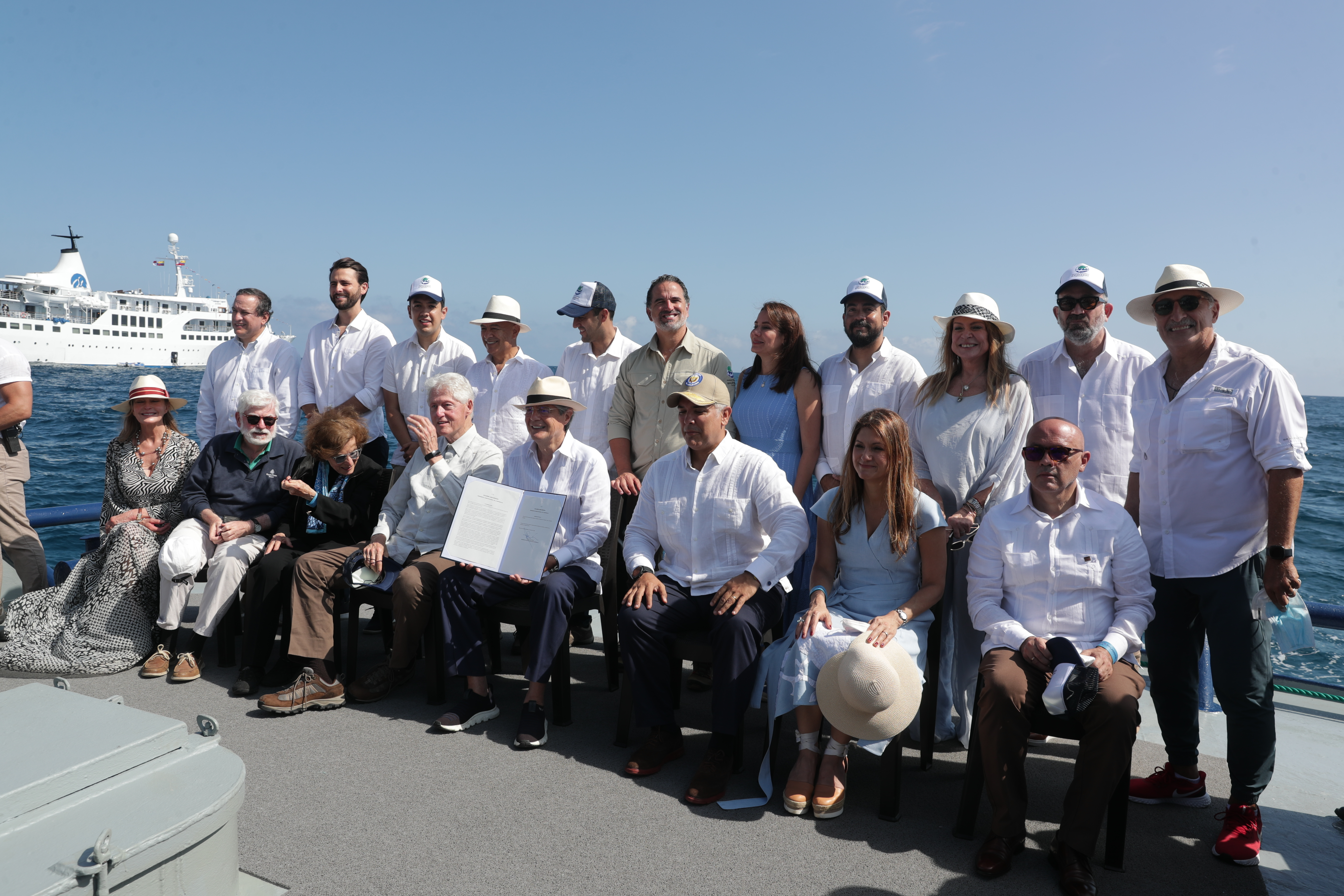
Manrique as Minister of the Environment (center), at the signing of the decree to expand the Galápagos Marine Reserve

On 17 May 2021, President-elect Guillermo Lasso appointed him Minister of the Environment; taking office on 24 May of the same year, with the beginning of government. During his period as minister, the expansion of the Galapagos marine reserve in 2022 stood out.

=== Minister of Foreign Affairs ===
On 2 April 2023, President Guillermo Lasso appointed him as the new Minister of Foreign Affairs and Human Mobility, with the title of Chancellor, following the resignation of Juan Carlos Holguín.
