= Ecuador–Peru football rivalry =

International football rivalry

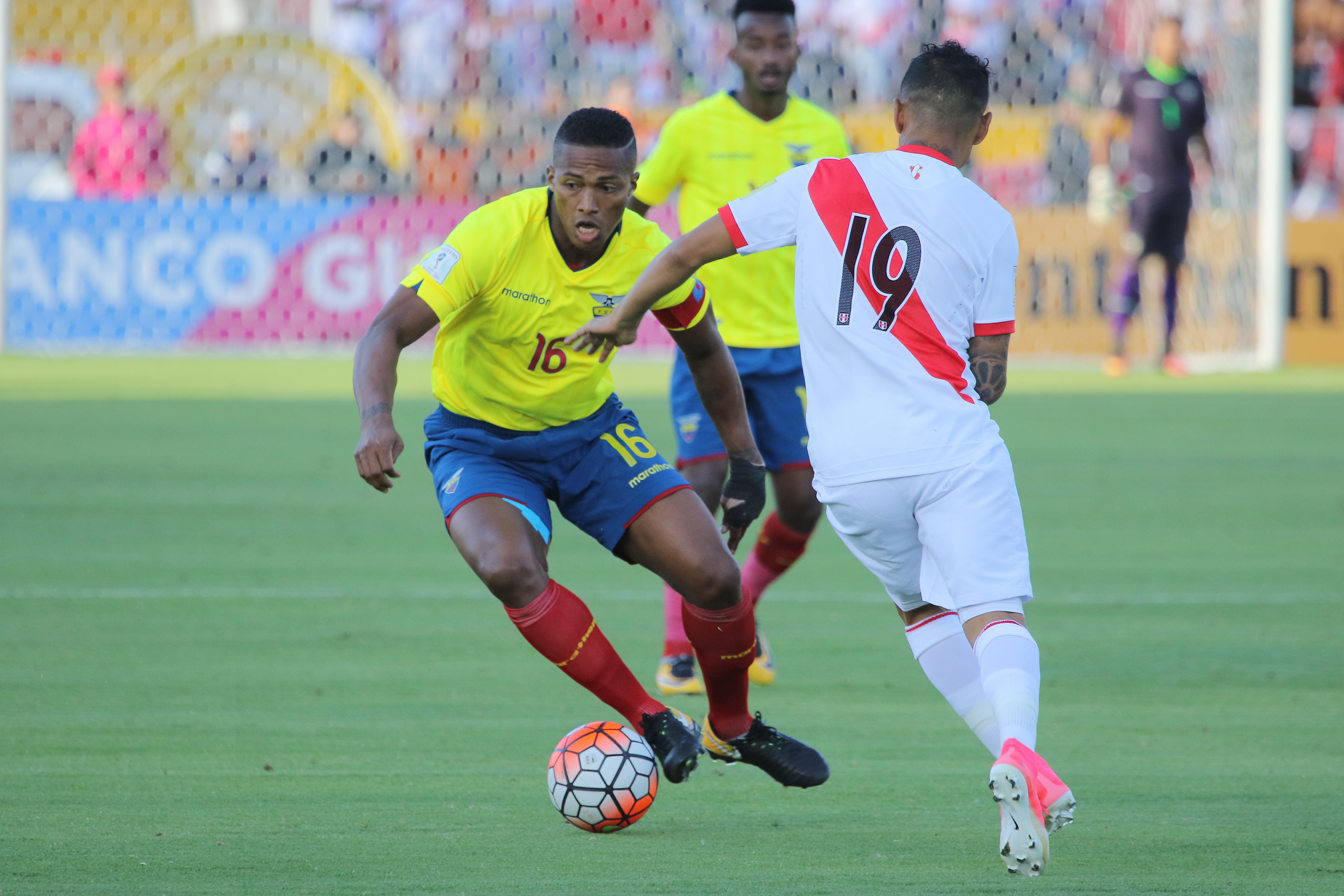
- 2018 World Cup qualifier between Ecuador and Peru
- Location: CONMEBOL (South America)
- Teams: Ecuador; Peru
- First meeting: Peru 9–1 Ecuador; 1938 Bolivarian Games (Bogotá, Colombia; 11 August 1938)
- Latest meeting: Peru 0–0 Ecuador; 2026 FIFA World Cup qualification (Lima, Peru; 10 June 2025)
- Next meeting: TBD

Statistics
- Total meetings: 54
- Most wins: Peru (21)
- Most player appearances: (Peru) Roberto Palacios (Ecuador) Iván Hurtado (14 matchs each)
- Top scorer: (Peru) Jorge Alcalde (6)
- Largest victory: Peru 9–1 Ecuador (Bogotá, Colombia; 11 August 1938)

The Ecuador–Peru football rivalry is a standing association football rivalry between the national football teams of Ecuador and Peru and their respective aficionados. Both teams compete in FIFA's South American Football Confederation (CONMEBOL).

Ecuador-Peru football matches encompass all games played between the national teams of Ecuador and Peru. While the rivalry between Ecuador and Peru is relatively low-intensity compared to their rivalry with Chile, it has steadily intensified since the late 1990s thanks to Ecuador's strong performances, making this match a classic fixture.

== History ==
The origins of this rivalry are long-standing, linked to border conflicts between the two countries, a situation that reached its peak during the Ecuadorian–Peruvian War of 1941. Moreover, the last confrontation between the two countries – the Cenepa War – is the origin of the nickname sometimes given to this rivalry: the Cenepa Clásico.

The first official match between the two teams took place on 11 August 1938, at the 1938 Bolivarian Games, where the Peruvians crushed their Ecuadorian counterparts nine goals to one. This match represents the greatest victory for Peruvians in their history.

Ecuador had to wait until 22 June 1975, to secure their first victory over their neighbors (6–0). Two years later, the two teams met again in the qualifiers for the 1978 World Cup, but Peru proved too strong for Ecuador (1–1 in Quito and 4–0 in Lima). However, the overall record in World Cup qualifying matches is rather favorable to Ecuador (seven wins to five for Peru). This is explained by Ecuador's performances, particularly in the 2002 and 2010 qualifiers (victories both at home and away).

Copa América matches, on the other hand, remain heavily in Peru's favor (eight wins to just one for their neighbors).

== National team records ==
=== FIFA World Cup ===
The first time both sides played each other was in the qualification round for the 1978 FIFA World Cup tournament. Both teams were placed in CONMEBOL's Group 3, along with Chile. After a draw in Quito (1–1) on 20 February 1977, the Peruvians won in Lima on 12 March, 4–0. Ecuador and Peru have met 18 times in World Cup qualifiers, with Ecuador winning 7, Peru winning 5, and 6 draws.

=== Copa América ===
Peru and Ecuador first faced each other in the 1939 South American Championship, when Peru wins 5–2 in Lima. Ecuador had to wait 56 years to win their first Copa América match against Peru. Indeed, during the 1995 Copa América in Uruguay, Ecuador defeated Peru 2–1. Ecuador and Peru have met 13 times in the Copa America, with Peru holding a largely favorable record of 8 wins against only one for Ecuador and 4 draws.

== See also ==
- Ecuador–Peru relations
- Ecuadorian–Peruvian War
