= Henry Cucalón =

Ecuadorian politician

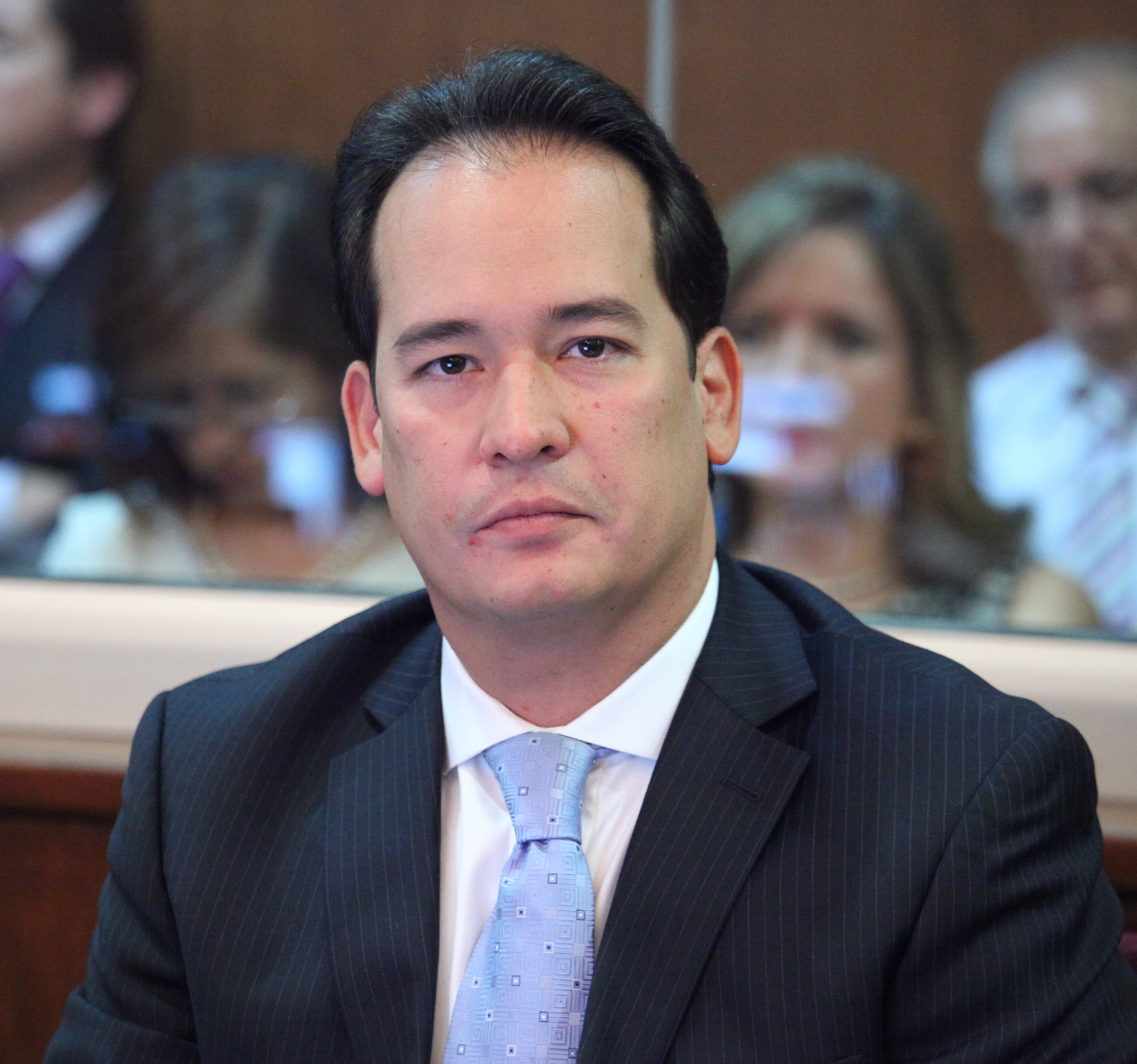
Cucalón in 2013

Henry Eduardo Cucalón Camacho (born 8 June 1973) is an Ecuadorian lawyer and politician who served as the Minister of the Government from 9 February 2023 to 23 November 2023 during the Guillermo Lasso administration. Previously, he served as a member of the National Assembly from 2013 until 2021. Cucalón was born in Guayaquil, Ecuador.

Cucalón was elected to the National Assembly in the 2013 general election under the parties PSC-MDG. He was re-elected in 2021.

In May 2023, Cucalón defended President Guillermo Lasso's decision to invoke muerte cruzada which led to the dissolution of the National Assembly.

In July 2024, Cucalón registered as a pre-candidate for the Movimiento Construye presidential nomination in the 2025 general election.
