= Alexandra Vela =

Ecuadorian lawyer and politician

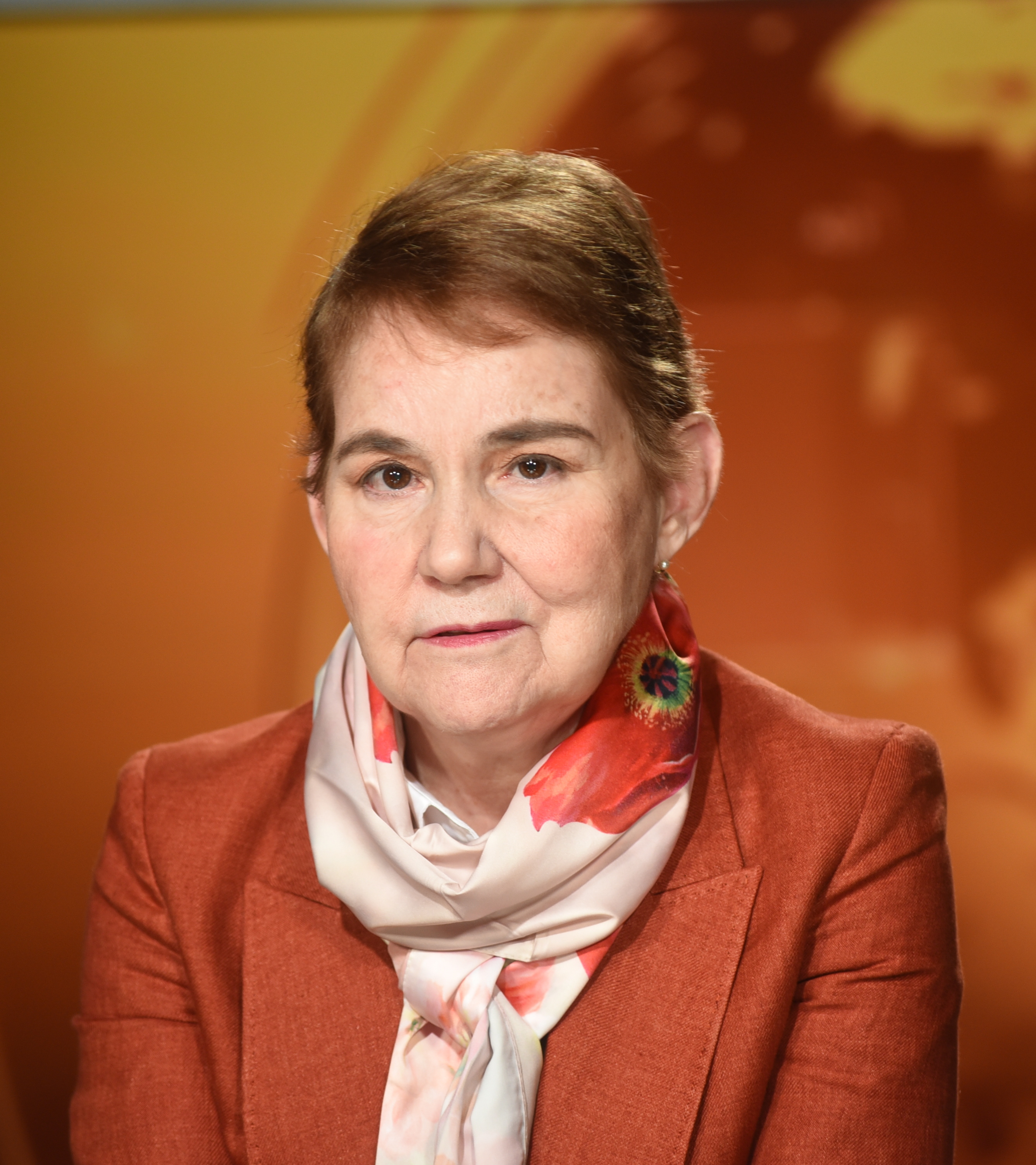

Minister of the Interior of Ecuador
- In office 14 July 2021 – 29 March 2022
- Preceded by: César Monge
- Succeeded by: Francisco Jiménez Sánchez

Member of the National Congress of Ecuador Province of Pichincha
- In office 1998–2003

Member of the Constituent Assembly of Ecuador Province of Pichincha
- In office 1997–1998

Vice President of the National Congress of Ecuador
- In office 1996–1997
- Preceded by: Franco Romero Loayza
- Succeeded by: Carlos Falquez

Member of the Metropolitan Council of Quito
- In office 1988–1996

Personal details
- Born: Alexandra Blanca Vela Puga San Salvador
- Occupation: Lawyer

Alexandra Blanca Vela Puga is an Ecuadorian lawyer and politician originally from El Salvador. She was the a dean of the Faculty of Law at the University of the Americas Ecuador.

== Biography ==
Alexandra Vela was born to Ecuadorian parents in El Salvador. She studied law at the University of Lima and the Catholic University of Santiago de Guayaquil. In 1997, she became one of the founding members of the Ecuadorian Christian Democratic Union. Vera became the Chief of staff of Jaime Roldós Aguilera in 1978, holding this position until Roldós's death in 1981, and then served as Undersecretary of Public Administration to Osvaldo Hurtado until the end of his presidency.

Vela served two four-year terms as the Metropolitan Councilor of Quito from 1988 to 1996. Later, she was elected to the National Congress of Ecuador to represent the CDU and the province of Pichincha. In this period, she sued then president Abdalá Bucaram for defamation after he accused Vera of having stolen documents important to the investigation of the death of former president Jaime Roldós Aguilera. The Supreme Court of Ecuador ruled in favor of Vera in 1998 and sentenced Bucaram to two years in prison, but he had by this time already fled to asylum in Panama.

From 1997 to 1998, Vera served as the Vice President of the National Congress. She resigned from this seat to join the Constituent Assembly of 1997–98, responsible for the drafting of the Constitution of 1998.

After the demise of the government of Jamil Mahuad and the disintegration of the CDU bloc in the National Congress, Vela became part of Osvaldo Hurtado's Solidarity Fatherland Movement. She would unsuccessfully attempt to win a seat in the legislative election of 2002.

She joined the Cabinet of Guillermo Lasso as Interior Minister in 2021.

== Sources ==
- Alcántara Sáez, Manuel, ed. (2001). Partidos políticos de América Latina. Países andinos (in Spanish). University of Salamanca. ISBN 9788478008421.
