= José Ayala Lasso =

Ecuadorian politician and diplomat

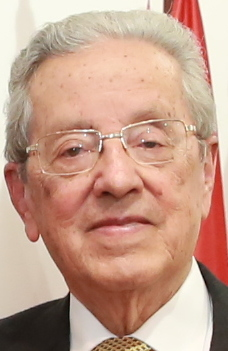
- Ayala Lasso in 2018

Ecuadorian Ambassador to China
- In office December 25, 1963 – December 15, 1965
- Preceded by: Gustavo Larrea Cordova
- Succeeded by: Lisimaco Guzman Aguirre

Ecuadorian Minister of Foreign Affairs
- In office 1977–1979
- Preceded by: Jorge Salvador Lara
- Succeeded by: Alfredo Pareja Diezcanseco

Ecuadorian Ambassador to the European Community
- In office December 17, 1979 – December 15, 1983
- Preceded by: Armando Pesantes García
- Succeeded by: Hernán Guarderas Iturralde

Ecuadorian Ambassador to the Holy See
- In office December 15, 1983 – 1984
- Preceded by: Manuel De Guzmán Polanco
- Succeeded by: Francisco Alfredo Salazar Alvarado

President of the United Nations Security Council
- In office September 1, 1992 – September 30, 1992
- Preceded by: Li Daoyu
- Succeeded by: Jean-Bernard Merimee

Ecuadorian Ambassador to United Nations New York
- In office March 1997 – September 12, 1997

United Nations High Commissioners for Human Rights
- In office 1994–1997
- Succeeded by: Mary Robinson

Ecuadorian Minister of Foreign Affairs
- In office 1997–1999
- Preceded by: Galo Leoro Franco
- Succeeded by: Fander Falconí

Personal details
- Born: 29 January 1932 (age 94) Quito, Ecuador

José Ayala Lasso (born 29 January 1932) is an Ecuadorian retired lawyer and diplomat, currently residing in Quito. He served as Foreign Minister of Ecuador on three occasions. He was the first United Nations High Commissioner for Human Rights

== Career ==
Pursuant to United Nations General Assembly Resolution A/RES/48/141 of 20 December 1993 Dr. Ayala Lasso was appointed first United Nations High Commissioner for Human Rights and started his four-year mandate on 5 April 1994.

His first important challenge was to give contours to his mandate and establish the credibility of the Office. Barely appointed, he had to address the crisis caused by the genocide in Rwanda. His years as High Commissioner were marked by a continuous effort to give greater visibility to the United Nations human rights programme. Thus, he opened field offices in all regions of the world and traveled extensively to confer with leaders worldwide. His vision was to transform the former Centre for Human Rights from a passive conference-services secretariat into a pro-active centre of excellence with an expert secretariat and an expanded mandate to conduct projects throughout the world. Under his leadership the office should develop an operational capacity similar to that of the Office of the High Commissioner for Refugees. His priorities were crisis management, prevention and early warning, assistance to States in transition to democracy, the right to development, and the expansion of national human rights institutions. As an administrator. he is remembered fondly by the staff because of his openness and kindness. Less successful were the efforts at restructuring, primarily because of the failure of the UN General Assembly to approve an adequate budget for the Office.

Dr. Ayala Lasso resigned on 31 March 1997 to return to Ecuador to broker the peace negotiations between Ecuador and Peru, which led to the conclusion of the Treaty of 1998, settling the border dispute. In his diplomatic career he was Ecuador's Ambassador to the United Nations and twice President of the Security Council. During the 48th session of the United Nations General Assembly in 1993, he chaired the working group responsible for the implementation of the Vienna Declaration and Programme of Action, which had been adopted at the World Conference on Human Rights in 1993. One of the recommendations of the Vienna Conference had been the establishment of the post of United Nations High Commissioner for Human Rights. He also served also as Ecuadorian Ambassador to the European Economic Communities, to France, Belgium, Luxembourg, Peru and the Vatican. He continues to be an active human rights advocate and is an active participant of "Project 2048" of the University of California at Berkeley, which aims at the creation of a World Court of Human Rights.
