= Government of Guillermo Lasso =

Ecuadorian government

The logo of Guillermo Lasso's government.

The Government of Guillermo Lasso governed the Republic of Ecuador from May 24, 2021, after the victory of Guillermo Lasso in the 2021 presidential elections.

The government was dissolved by November 25, 2023, following the 2023 Ecuadorian general election.

== Background ==
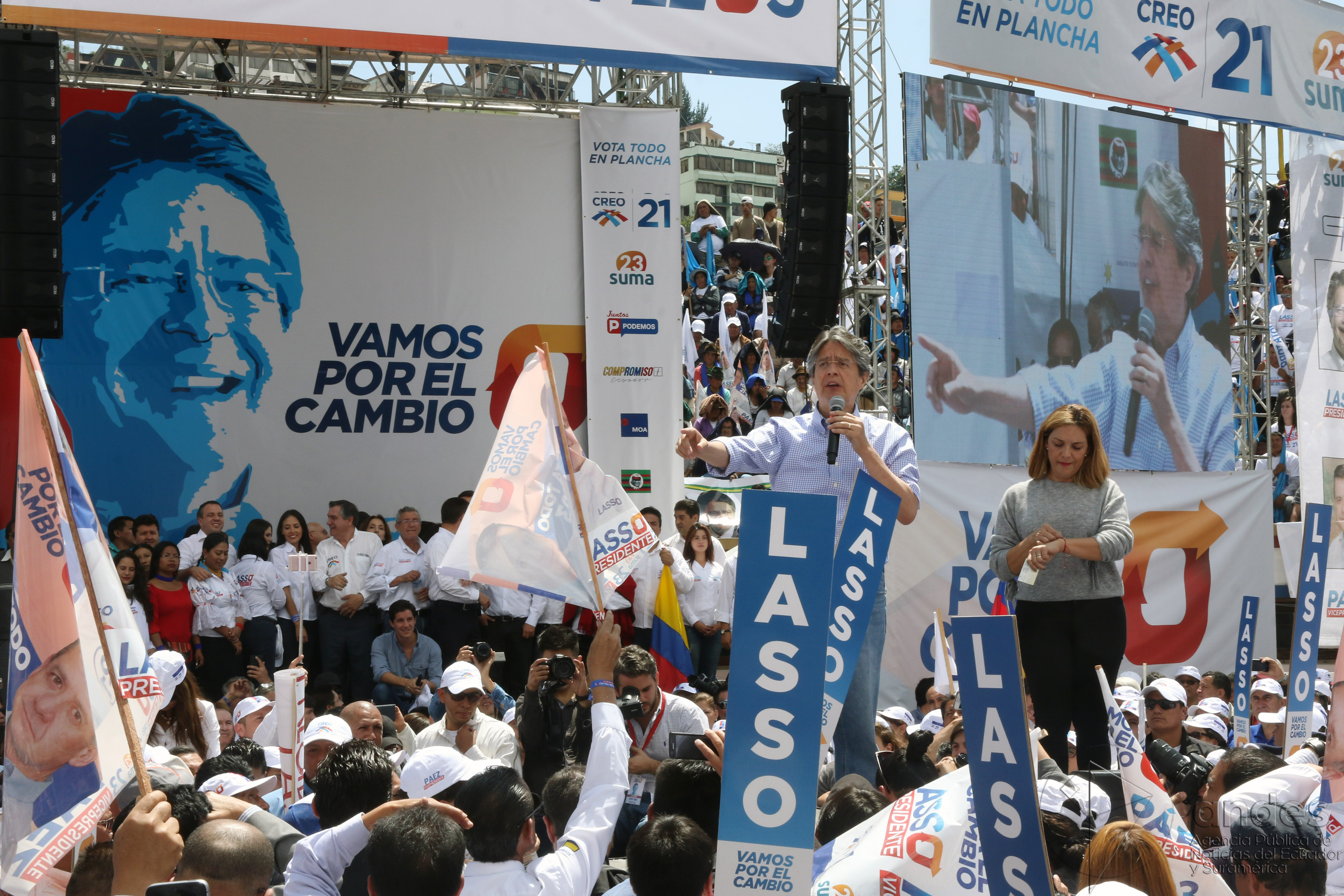
Guillermo Lasso during the 2017 presidential campaign.

On 19 February 2017, Lasso participated in the Ecuadorian presidential election as the candidate of the Creating Opportunities movement and obtained 28.09% of the vote in the first round, advancing to the runoff against Lenín Moreno, candidate of the ruling party PAIS Alliance. The second round was held on 2 April, resulting in Moreno's victory with 51.16% of the vote against Lasso's 48.84%.

In August 2020, he announced his candidacy for president for the third time in the 2021 election, qualifying for the second round after finishing second with 20% of the vote. In the runoff, contested with Andrés Arauz of Union for Hope, Lasso won the election with 52.36% of the vote against Arauz's 47.64%.

== Transition of power ==
Lasso began the transition of power process a few days after his electoral victory, appointing former Quito mayoral candidate Juan Carlos Holguín and Iván Correa as those in charge of the transfer of power process, coordinating the work between the outgoing government of Lenín Moreno and the incoming one, with Labor Minister Andrés Isch being put in charge of the transition process on behalf of Moreno's government. Lasso gave the transfer of power process a style similar to that used in changes of government in the United States, inaugurating an Office of the President-elect, with its own press office and logo. Lasso announced his ministers of state by sector through virtual events, beginning with the social sector.

== Inauguration ==
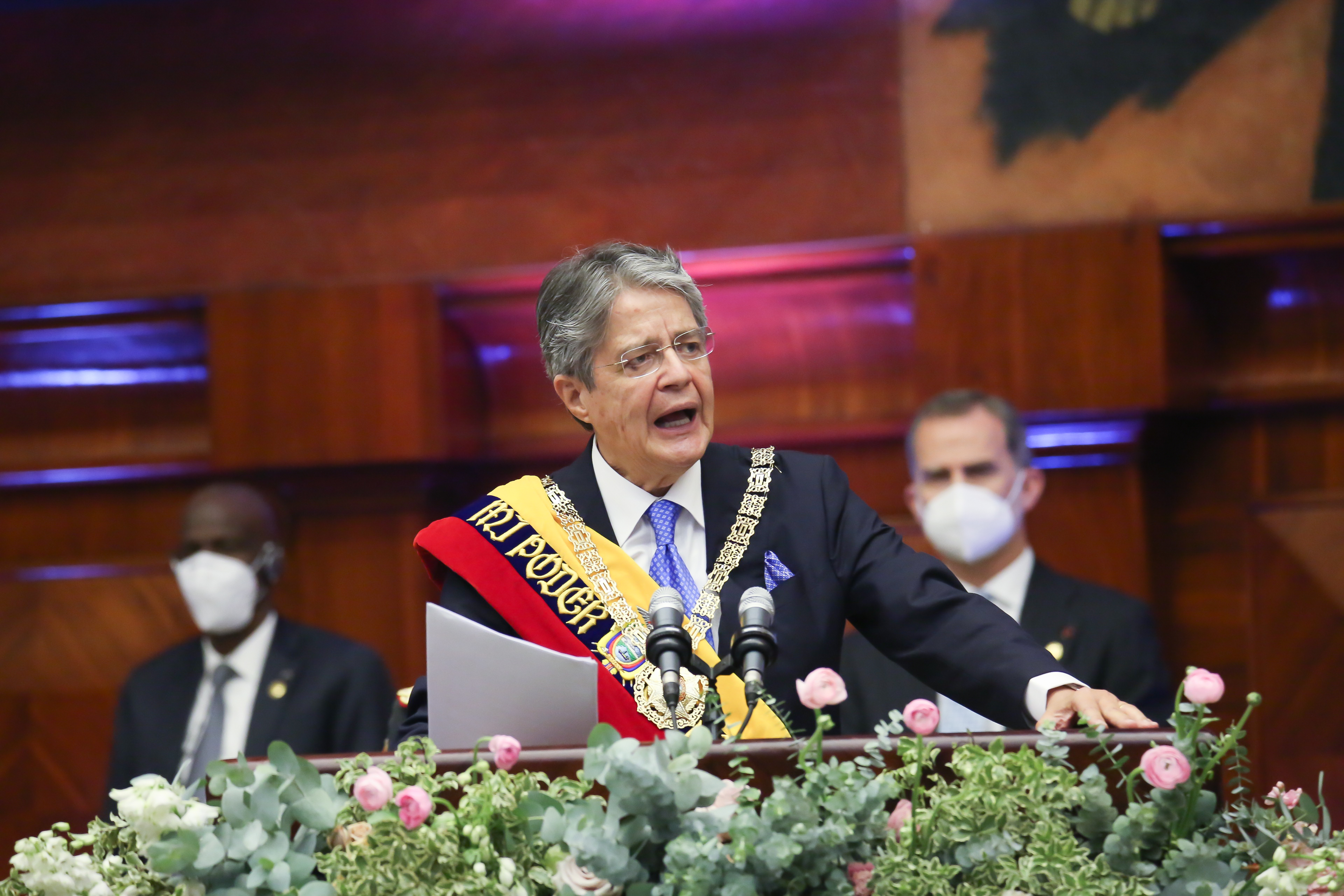
Guillermo Lasso during his inaugural address

Lasso was sworn in as president on 24 May 2021 at the Legislative Palace, where the National Assembly sits, succeeding Lenín Moreno in office.

Lasso was accompanied by his wife María de Lourdes Alcívar and his youngest daughter.

Attending the ceremony were the King of Spain, Felipe VI, the president of Haiti, Jovenel Moïse, the president of the Dominican Republic, Luis Abinader, the president of Brazil, Jair Bolsonaro, the vice president of Paraguay, Hugo Velázquez, the United States ambassador to the UN, Linda Thomas-Greenfield, among others.

The president of the National Assembly, Guadalupe Llori, was in charge of administering the oath of office to Lasso as president and to Alfredo Borrero as vice president.

== Domestic policy ==
=== First decrees ===
On the afternoon of 24 May, Lasso signed his first decrees, in which he initially officially presented the ministers of his cabinet. Among them was the modification of the Sports Secretariat, transformed into the Ministry of Sports, in addition to the removal of the names of citizens from the risk register who had debts of up to $1,000 USD.

He also assigned functions to Vice President Alfredo Borrero, such as coordinating public policies for the strengthening of the National Health System and representing the country before international health organizations.

Finally, he repealed the general regulations to the Communications Law and announced that he would send a bill on freedom of expression to the National Assembly.

=== Economy ===
When Lasso took office, Ecuador was facing a serious economic crisis, with a GDP decline of 8% in 2020, mainly due to the COVID-19 pandemic and the fall in oil prices.

On the eve of his inauguration, he announced the privatization of three refineries, highways, the public telecommunications company, and Banco del Pacífico, as well as tax exemptions for investments in the tourism sector for a period of thirty years.

In August 2021, the president decreed a reduction of the tax rate to 0% on the tax on capital outflows for transfers, remittances, or movements of foreign currency made by foreign airlines authorized to operate in the country.

The economic recovery was slow after the GDP fall in 2020: +2.8% in 2021 and +3.5% in 2022, mainly due to oil sales. This was one of the weakest performances in South America. At the same time, Ecuador came under pressure from the International Monetary Fund (IMF), which demanded "structural reforms". To continue obtaining IMF funds, the government chose to cut public spending, causing a deterioration in services. Despite the pandemic, the hospital sector was subjected to a layoff plan, while budget cuts caused medicine shortages. Pressure on the living standards of the poorest increased.

In June 2022, his government committed to the Prospectors and Developers Association of Canada to reactivate several hundred mining projects suspended by previous governments.

=== Health ===
==== Vaccination against COVID-19 ====
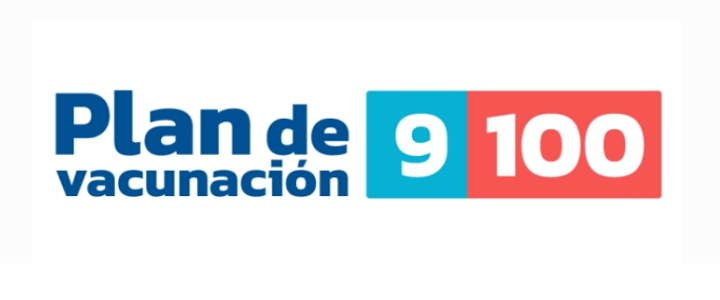
Logo of the vaccination plan, called 9/100, meaning 9 million vaccinated in 100 days.

Lasso's government began amid the health crisis caused by the COVID-19 pandemic in Ecuador. One of his campaign promises was to vaccinate nine million people in the first hundred days of his government. He appointed Dr. Ximena Garzón as Minister of Health and head of the vaccination against COVID-19.

Vaccination was suspended nationwide on the day Lasso took office, due to an inventory of doses, and resumed on 26 May 2021.

To achieve the goal of immunizing 9 million people, on 27 May 2021 the Ministry of Health and the National Electoral Council (CNE) reached an inter-institutional agreement to support the vaccination plan, in which the CNE undertook to:

- Support the execution of the vaccination plan at electoral polling places.
- Make available to the Ministry of Health the electoral roll used in the last elections.
- Create a web application so that people could consult their vaccination site, which was launched on 29 May 2021. At first this application had access problems because of the heavy volume of queries, but these problems were later solved.

=== Pandora Papers case ===
On 3 October 2021, the publication of notes linked to the Pandora Papers (in Spanish, Papeles de Pandora) began, a set of 11.9 million documents analyzed by the International Consortium of Investigative Journalists. The information is related to various offshore accounts of celebrities, politicians, and very wealthy people.

The different journalists who participated in the analysis of the information were able to determine that there are links between offshore companies and political leaders, businesspeople, people connected to finance, and artists. It was determined that "35 world leaders hid their fortunes in tax havens." Among them was President Guillermo Lasso.

=== Media ===
According to the 2021 Chapultepec Index of the Inter American Press Association (IAPA), Ecuador was ranked 13th place in the American ranking of freedom of expression and press, being classified in the list of countries "with restrictions" on press freedom. It dropped to 14th place in 2022 and remained in this position in 2023.

=== Security ===
==== Security crisis ====
Since 2021, Ecuador has suffered a security crisis resulting from conflicts between criminal organizations with links to drug trafficking. The wave of violence has generated a marked upturn in the number of murders in the country. On 18 October 2021, Guillermo Lasso declared a state of exception throughout the national territory for 60 days due to the increase in criminal activity. In 2021, the intentional homicide rate reached 14.04 per 100,000 people (the highest since 2011), compared with a rate of 7.8 in 2020. These figures continued to increase in 2022. The most violent area of the country is the one comprising the cantons of Guayaquil, Durán and Samborondón. That area saw 53 murders between January and February 2021 and 162 in the same period of 2022. On 10 August 2023, Lasso declared another state of exception in the national territory due to the increase in criminal activity nationwide.

The focus of the violence developed inside the country's prisons, with events such as the Guayaquil Penitentiary massacre of 28 September, which occurred in 2021 and is considered the fifth bloodiest prison massacre in the history of Latin America. In total, 503 inmates were killed in the country during 2021 alone. However, the wave of violence also manifested outside prisons. This was reflected in public perception, as shown by a survey conducted by Click Research in October 2021, which indicated that crime was considered by citizens to be the biggest problem facing the country.

=== 2022 protests ===
In June 2022, anti-government protests broke out in Ecuador.

The 2022 Ecuador protests began on 13 June; these were a wave of mobilizations carried out from 13 to 30 June 2022, called by several social organizations, mainly by the Confederation of Indigenous Nationalities of Ecuador (CONAIE), in opposition to the policies of Lasso's government. The mobilizations occurred after the first year of Lasso's government, during which the price of fuels and the basic family basket had risen considerably; in addition to the worsening of the security crisis that had been affecting the country since the government of Lenín Moreno. Likewise, shortages and the inoperability of the public health system were highlighted. After 18 days of the national strike, the indigenous organizations and the government reached an agreement thanks to the mediation of the Ecuadorian Episcopal Conference; the parties to the conflict signed a "Peace Act" drawn up by the Church as mediator, in which they agreed on various points. Among those present were government authorities and representatives of CONAIE, FEINE, and FENOCIN. The executive agreed to reduce the price of fuel, to work on targeting its subsidy, to repeal executive decree 95 related to oil policy, and to reform decree 151 to prohibit mining activity in protected areas. For their part, the indigenous organizations declared an end to the mobilizations and a return to their communities; in addition, the agreements established a dialogue table that would last 90 days.

On 1 April 2023, Lasso's government authorized the carrying of firearms for citizens who meet the requirements of the law in the country.

=== Encuentro case ===
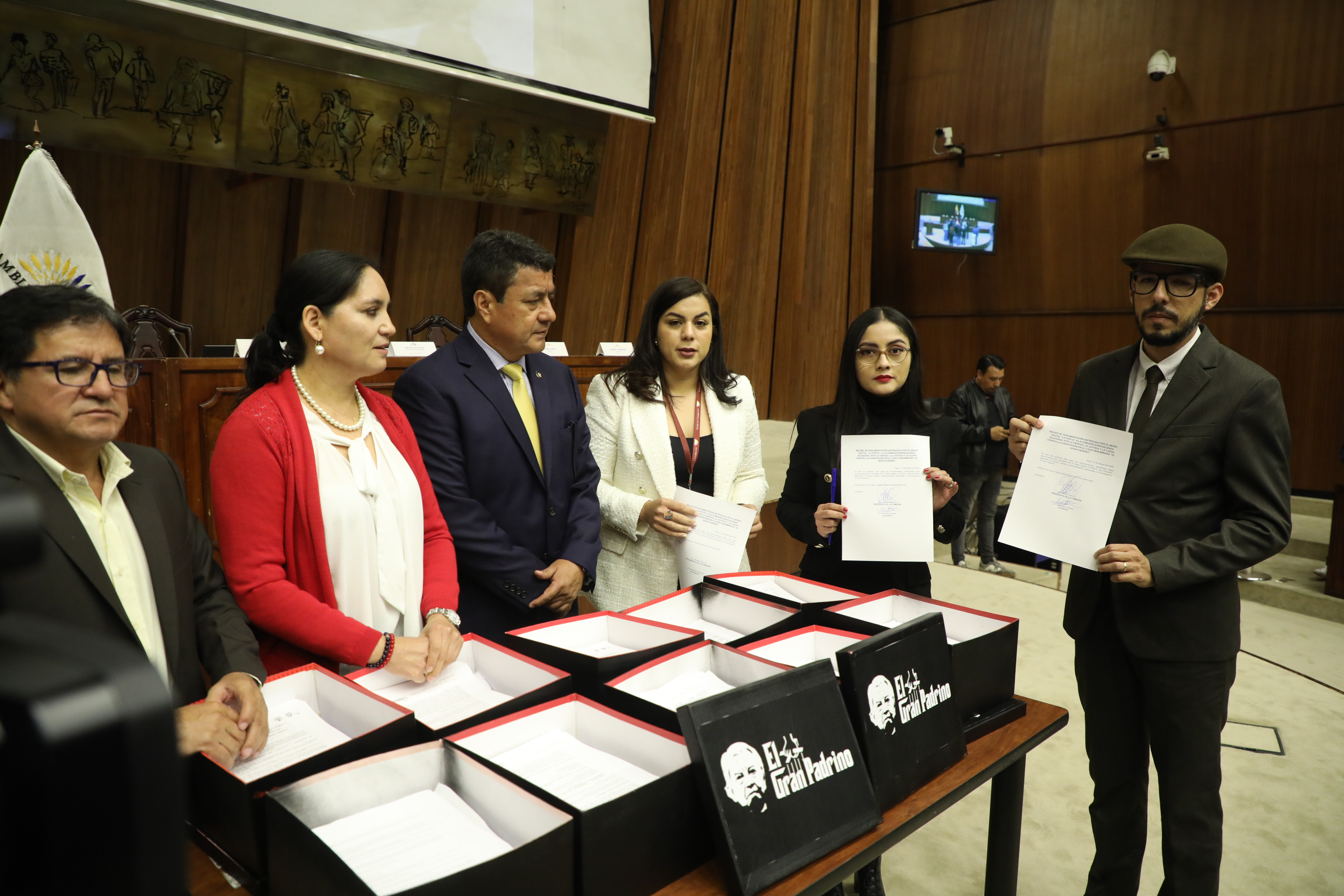
Delivery of information to the National Assembly on the Encuentro case by La Posta.

On 9 January 2023, the digital outlet La Posta published an investigation showing a corruption network in public companies, led by Danilo Carrera Drouet, Lasso's brother-in-law. His trusted operator would be Rubén Chérrez, who in 2021 created seven companies in a single day and would be prosecuted for drug trafficking. The scandal was named the "El Gran Padrino Case". The government remained silent for two days, until Guillermo Lasso, in an interview given on 11 January, rejected the accusation and defended Carrera. Subsequently, four of the main people implicated in the case fled the country; one of them reportedly rented an armored truck, allegedly to transport cash and some goods. On 20 January, eleven days after La Posta's publication, the Prosecutor's Office carried out eight simultaneous raids in Guayaquil and one in Quito as part of the investigations of the case, renaming it the "Encuentro case".

=== Impeachment ===
The impeachment of Guillermo Lasso is a legislative procedure carried out by the National Assembly of Ecuador in accordance with the parameters established by the Constitution of the Republic, due to accusations of corruption in public companies within the Encuentro case. After investigations carried out by an ad hoc legislative committee made up mostly of opponents of the government, a non-binding report was presented that led the full Assembly to approve the start of impeachment proceedings against the president on 4 March 2023.

The impeachment process began on 16 March, and its admissibility was approved by a ruling of the Constitutional Court on 29 March.

The impeachment itself began on 16 May, with the questioning by assembly members Viviana Veloz and Esteban Torres. Subsequently, President Lasso appeared before the full legislature, but did not exercise his right of reply, which his questioners did. After these interventions, the president of the Assembly, Virgilio Saquicela, opened the debate.

=== "Muerte cruzada" ===
On 17 May 2023, Lasso dissolved parliament through Executive Decree 741, in which he activated article 148 of the National Constitution, called muerte cruzada, arguing in his decree "serious political crisis and internal commotion". This decree requires the National Electoral Council to call extraordinary presidential and legislative elections, to complete Lasso's term, within seven days.

External videos
- Militarization of the National Assembly of Ecuador, 17 May 2023.

That measure, together with the militarization of the Legislative Palace, was considered by much of Ecuadorian public opinion and the political sector as a political maneuver to stop the trial being carried out in parliament against President Lasso. In addition, it was described as "illegal" by those political actors; therefore, six actions of unconstitutionality were filed against the presidential decree. However, the Constitutional Court rejected the lawsuits and ratified the muerte cruzada decreed by the president.

=== Approval polls ===
View source data.

Pollster/Media outlet	Date	Sample size	Margin of error	Guillermo Lasso (President of the Republic)	
Pollster/Media outlet	Date	Sample size	Margin of error	Appr.	Disappr.
Perfiles de opinión	16 Aug 2023	618	4,03	9,71%	90,06%
Latinobarómetro	21 Jul 2023	-	3	14%	84%
Perfiles de opinión	9 Jul 2023	615	4,03	17,75%	81,61%
CID Gallup	20 Jun 2023	1200	2.8	15%	85%
Perfiles de opinión	4 Jun 2023	622	4	20,36%	79,07%
Perfiles de opinión	1 May 2023	618	4.02	13,93%	84,72%
Imasen	21 April 2023	1500	2.5	14,3%	85,7%
Perfiles de opinión	21 Mar 2023	612	4.04	13,47%	85,46%
Perfiles de opinión	13 Feb 2023	619	4.1	12,96%	85%
Perfiles de opinión	30 Dec 2022	1239	2.84	18,3%	80,58%
Market	29 Dec 2022	760	3	18,2%	81,8%
Ipsos	21 Dec 2022	2490	-	33%	67%
Cedatos	12 - 21 Dec 2022	2500	-	29.4%	70.6%
Perfiles de opinión	12 Nov 2022	613	4.04	12.62%	82.19%
Cedatos	8 Nov 2022	-	-	28%	72%
CID Gallup	13 Oct 2022	1200	2.8	17%	83%
Perfiles de opinión	9 Oct 2022	614	4.04	16.62%	82.56%
Perfiles de opinión	29 August 2022	620	4.02	17.32%	81.86%
Click Report	12 - 14 Aug 2022	760	3	25.81%	74.19%
Ipsos	14 Jul–8 Aug 2022	297	-	38%	47%
Imasen	18-22 Jul 2022	1200	2.9	13.5%	82.8%
Perfiles de opinión	12 Jul 2022	598	4.09	28.23%	70.73%
Perfiles de opinión	5 Jun 2022	712	3.75	17.14%	81.20%
Cedatos	27 May 2022	2020	2.40	38.50%	54.60%
Click Report	20 May 2022	760	3	28.82%	71.18%
Perfiles de opinión	25 Apr 2022	617	4.03	30.82%	66.80%
Market	2–3 Apr 2022	760	3.00	51.9%	48.1%
Perfiles de opinión	12–14 Mar 2022	704	3.77	33.64%	63.35%
Perfiles de opinión	31 January 2022	612	4.04	35.16%	60.16%
Click Report	19 Jan 2022	760	3.00	51.81%	48.19%
Perfiles de opinión	18-20 Dec 2021	1,238	2.94	37.78%	59.07%
Clima social	5 Dec 2021	1,670	2.40	37.6%	56.6%
Perfiles de opinión	13–15 Nov 2021	621	4.09	28.35%	67.38%
Clima Social	16–18 October 2021	2,645	1.90	42.30%	53.30%
Click Report	18 Oct 2021	760	3.00	56.21%	27.61%
Cedatos	4 Oct 2021	–	-	63.50%	30.70%
Perfiles de opinión	2–4 Oct 2021	621	4.09	34.01%	60.32%
Clima Social	4–5 Sep 2021	1,600	-	61.80%	30.60%
Cedatos	26–30 Aug 2021	1,874	3.40	74.10%	25.90%
Perfiles de Opinión	21–23 Aug 2021	619	-	64.03%	27.91%
Cedatos	2–5 August 2021	1,816	3.40	73.50%	26.50%
Click Report	1–31 Jul 2021	760	3.00	76.71%	23.29%
Ipsos	30 Jun–13 Jul 2021	380	-	47.00%	32.00%
Perfiles de Opinión	10–13 Jul 2021	620	-	74.00%	23.58%
Cedatos	1–4 Jun 2021	2,200	-	71.40%	28.60%

=== Fall of the government ===
In May 2023, the National Assembly officially began a second impeachment proceeding against President Lasso. As a result, on 17 May 2023, Lasso dissolved the National Assembly by invoking a constitutional measure known as muerte cruzada, triggering the 2023 general election.
