= Ecuador–Peru relations =

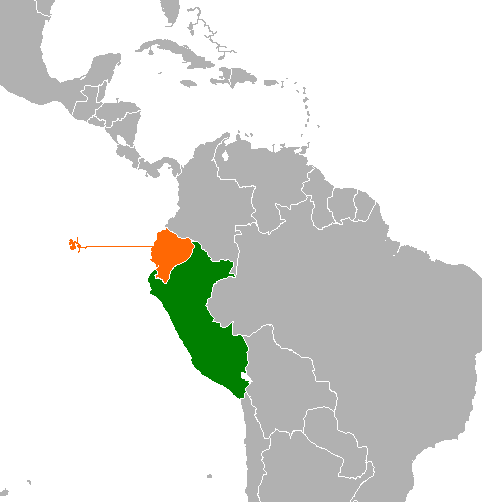
- Peru: Ecuador

Ecuador–Peru relations are the bilateral relations between the Republic of Ecuador and the Republic of Peru. Both nations are members of the Community of Latin American and Caribbean States, Organization of Ibero-American States, Organization of American States, and the United Nations.

== History ==
Peru and Ecuador share a long history dating back to the time of the Inca Empire, in which Quito was an important administrative center in the region. During the viceregal era, the province of Quito belonged to the Viceroyalty of Peru until the Bourbon Reforms implemented by King Philip V, incorporating them into the new Viceroyalty of Nueva Granada, a situation that would continue until independence.

After the Spanish American wars of independence, both countries established relations in 1831, with their first treaties being signed the following year.

During the republican period, both countries would have constant tensions over territorial issues that would not be resolved until the signing of the Protocol of Peace, Friendship and Limits of Rio de Janeiro in 1942 as a result of the 1941 Ecuadorian–Peruvian War and its subsequent consolidation with the signing of the Act of Brasilia in 1998 as a result of the Cenepa War. Since then, both countries have experienced a growing improvement and strengthening of their relations, which has led to greater commercial exchange.

In 2007, the binational cabinet between Ecuador and Peru was established in Tumbes. On May 2, 2011, Ecuador and Peru signed a Maritime Boundary Agreement.

== Resident diplomatic missions ==
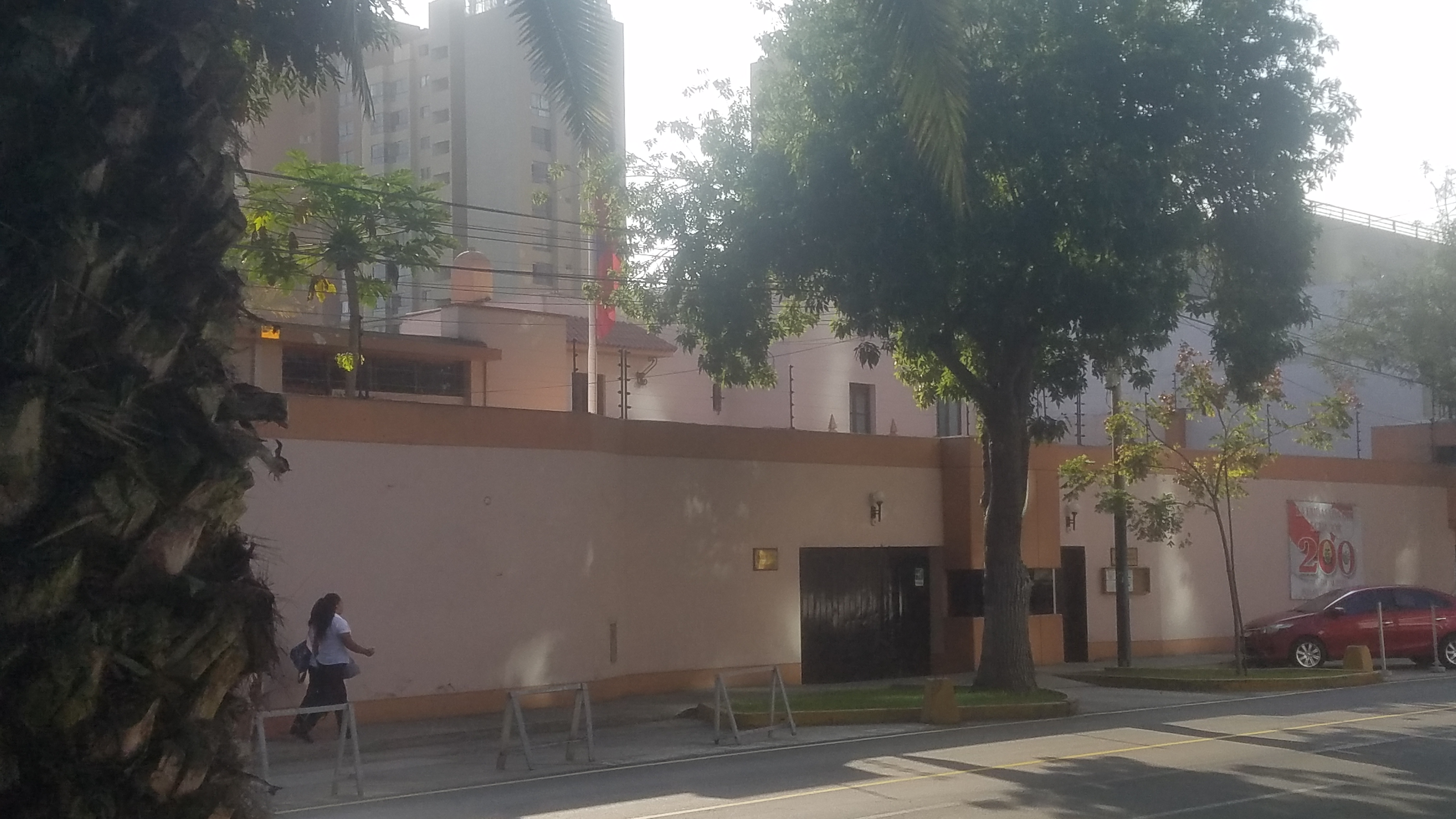
Embassy of Ecuador in Lima

- Ecuador has an embassy in Lima and a consulate in Piura and Tumbes.
- Peru has an embassy in Quito and consulates-general in Guayaquil, Loja and Machala and a consulate in Macará.

== See also ==
- Ecuador–Peru border
- Ecuador–Peru football rivalry
- Ecuadorian–Peruvian territorial dispute
- Foreign relations of Ecuador
- Foreign relations of Peru
- List of ambassadors of Ecuador to Peru
- List of ambassadors of Peru to Ecuador
