= List of ambassadors of Ecuador to China =

Ambassador of Ecuador to China
- Inaugural holder: Gustavo Larrea Cordova
- Formation: October 3, 1958

The Ecuadorian ambassador in Beijing is the official representative of the Government in Quito to the government of the People's Republic of China.

== List of representatives ==
Diplomatic agrément/Appointment /Arrival	Diplomatic accreditation	Ambassador	Ambassador Transcription into Chinese characters Standard Chinese	Observations	President of Ecuador	Premier of the People's Republic of China	Term end
September 26, 1958	October 3, 1958	Gustavo Larrea Cordova	赖瑞雅	Ambassador with residence in Tokyo appointed on September 24, 1958 concurrently as ambassador in Taipei.	Camilo Ponce Enríquez	Mao Zedong	1963
November 25, 1963		José Ayala Lasso	艾亚拉	Chargé d'affaires with residence in Tokyo.	Ramón Castro Jijón	Liu Shaoqi	1982
April 8, 1965	April 13, 1965	Lisimaco Guzman Aguirre	顾思明	Ambassador with residence in Tokyo. (July 21, 1912, in Guayaquil –November 2, 1973, in Quito),	Ramón Castro Jijón	Liu Shaoqi	1967
September 13, 1967		Bolivar Oquendo Hidalgo	欧肯多	Chargé d'affaires with residence in Tokyo.	Otto Arosemena	Liu Shaoqi	1971
				On January 2, 1980, Ecuador established diplomatic relations with the People's Republic of China.	Jaime Roldós Aguilera	Zhao Ziyang	
July 13, 1981	July 18, 1981	Gonzalo Pareded Grespo	贡萨洛·帕雷德斯·克雷斯波		Osvaldo Hurtado	Zhao Ziyang	July 21, 1983
January 24, 1984	January 27, 1984	Juan Manuel Aguirre Vásconez	胡安·曼努埃尔·阿吉雷	(1932 – 1994)	León Febres Cordero	Zhao Ziyang	October 1988
February 9, 1989	February 21, 1989	Rodrigo Váldez Baquero	罗德里戈·巴尔德斯·巴克罗	In 1996 he was Ecuadorian ambassador to Chile.	Rodrigo Borja Cevallos	Li Peng	January 1991
September 21, 1991	September 26, 1991	César Enrique Román González	塞萨尔·恩里克·罗曼·冈萨雷斯		Rodrigo Borja Cevallos	Li Peng	1996
May 15, 1996	June 7, 1996	Fernando Córdova Bossano	费尔南多·科尔多瓦·博萨诺	From 1988 to 1992 he was Ecuadorian ambassador to Colombia.	Abdalá Bucaram	Li Peng	April 2001
June 6, 2001	July 4, 2001	José Rafael Serrano Herrera	何塞·拉法埃尔·塞拉诺	From 2004 to 2006 he was Ecuadorian ambassador to Argentina.	Gustavo Noboa	Zhu Rongji	year 2004
May 7, 2004	June 25, 2004	Rodrigo Yépez Enríquez	罗德里戈·耶佩斯·恩里克斯		Lucio Gutiérrez	Wen Jiabao	September 2007
October 2007	November 15, 2007	Washington Hago Mendizabal	华盛顿·阿戈	Chen surnamed Chinese	Rafael Correa	Wen Jiabao	November 2010
November 2010	February 14, 2011	Leonardo Arizaga Vega	莱昂纳多·阿里萨加		Rafael Correa	Wen Jiabao	
December 2012	December 17, 2012	José María Borja López	何塞·博尔哈·洛佩斯		Rafael Correa	Wen Jiabao	December 1, 2017
March 1, 2018	March 23, 2018	Carlos Humberto Larrea Dávila	卡洛斯·拉雷亚		Lenín Moreno	Li Keqiang	June 2, 2023
September 21, 2023		María Soledad Córdova Montero	玛丽亚·科尔多瓦		Daniel Noboa	Li Qiang	
