= A New Option =

Non-profit organization in Ecuador

A New Option (Spanish: Una Nueva Opción; UNO) was a non-profit organization from Ecuador which trains future political leaders.

It was founded by Eduardo Maruri, a well known business man from Guayaquil, former president of the Guayaquil Chamber of Commerce and the Federación de Cámaras del Ecuador; Xavier Castro, a lawyer from Guayaquil; Mae Montaño and Santiago Rivadeneira from the Andean region of Ecuador.
