= Luis Valencia Rodríguez =

Ecuadorian jurist and diplomat (1926–2022)

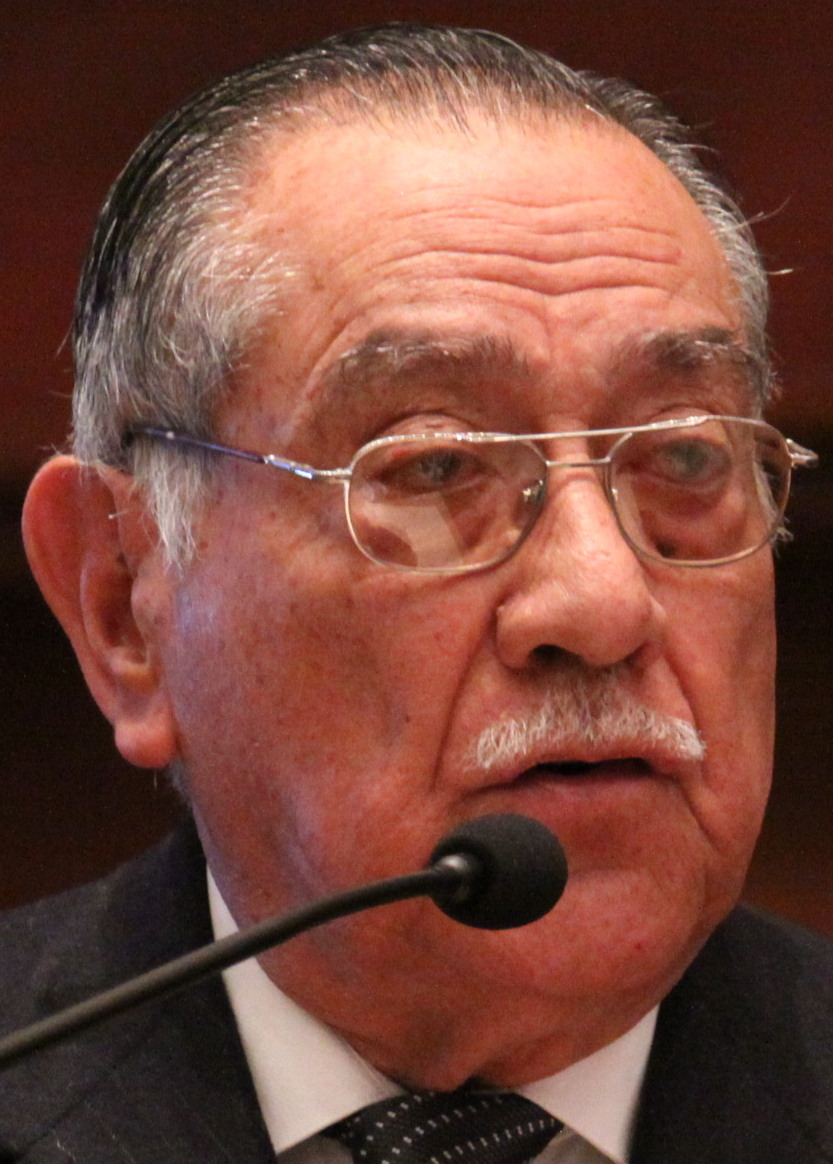

Ecuador Minister of Foreign Affairs
- In office December 14, 1965 – March 31, 1966
- President: Military Junta of Government
- Preceded by: Wilson Córdova Moscoso
- Succeeded by: Jorge Salvador Lara
- In office November 15, 1981 – September 8, 1984
- President: Osvaldo Hurtado
- Preceded by: Alfonso Barrera Valverde
- Succeeded by: Édgar Terán Terán

Ecuador Ambassador to Bolivia
- In office 1969–1971

Ecuador Ambassador to Brazil
- In office 1971–1974

Ecuador Ambassador to Peru
- In office 1974–1978
- In office 2005–2006

Ecuador Ambassador to Venezuela
- In office 1978–1979

Ecuador Ambassador to Argentina
- In office 1989–1991

Ecuador Ambassador and Permantent Representative to the United Nations
- In office 1994–1999

President of the Ecuadorean Delegation III United Nations Convention on the Law of the Sea
- In office 1994–1999

President United Nations Committee on the Elimination of Racial Discrimination
- In office 1972–1974
- In office 1984–1986
- In office 1992–1994

Personal details
- Born: March 5, 1926 Quito, Ecuador
- Died: August 18, 2022 (aged 96) Quito, Ecuador
- Spouse: Cleopatra Moreno Estrella (1952–2022)
- Parent(s): Pedro Leonidas Valencia, María Guadalupe Rodríguez
- Education: Universidad Central del Ecuador
- Profession: Jurist, diplomat
- Awards: Grand Cross National Order of San Lorenzo; Grand Cross National Order of Merit

Luis Valencia Rodríguez (March 5, 1926 – August 18, 2022) was an Ecuadorean jurist, diplomat, academic and writer. He served as Ecuador Minister of Foreign Affairs on two occasions. He served as Ecuador ambassador to Bolivia, Brazil, Peru, Venezuela, Argentina and as Permanent Representative of Ecuador to the United Nations in New York. He was member and president of the United Nations Committee on the Elimination of Racial Discrimination.
