= List of ambassadors of Peru to Ecuador =

Ambassador of Peru to the Republic of Ecuador
- Great Seal of Peru
- Ministry of Foreign Affairs; Av. Republica de El Salvador 495 E, Quito
- Appointer: The president of Peru
- Inaugural holder: Francisco Mariátegui
- Formation: 1832
- Website: Embassy of Peru in Ecuador

The extraordinary and plenipotentiary ambassador of Peru in the Republic of Ecuador is the official representative of the Republic of Peru to the Republic of Ecuador.

As a result of the dissolution of the Republic of Colombia, the State of Ecuador was established in 1830, having been preceded by Peru in 1821. Both countries established relations in 1831, with their first treaties being signed the following year. Both countries have maintained their relations since, with one exception from 1858 to 1860, as a result of the first Ecuadorian–Peruvian War (despite the second Ecuadorian–Peruvian War in 1941, Peru and Ecuador did not sever diplomatic relations).

The dispute ended with the 1998 Brasilia Presidential Act, and relations have stabilized since.

== List of representatives ==
Name	Portrait	Term begin	Term end	President	Notes
Tomás Guido and Toribio de Luzuriaga		1820	1821	José de San Martín	Sent to Guayaquil by San Martín as commissioners to the junta in Guayaquil.
Francisco J. de Salazar and José Baquíjano		1821	July 15, 1822	José de San Martín	Retired when Guayaquil was annexed to Colombia.
Manuel Rojas		1822	1822	José de San Martín	Final diplomatic agent before the Guayaquil Conference.
Francisco Javier Mariátegui y Tellería		1832	1833	Agustín Gamarra	As Plenipotentiary Minister of Peru in Ecuador
Juan José Salas		1835	1835	Felipe Santiago Salaverry	As Plenipotentiary Minister of Peru in Ecuador
Domingo Nieto		1835	1836	Felipe Santiago Salaverry	As Plenipotentiary Minister of Peru in Ecuador
José Plácido Roldán		1837	1838	Andrés de Santa Cruz	As Consul General and Chargé d'Affaires of the Peru–Bolivian Confederation in Ecuador
Manuel Lorenzo de Vidaurre		1838	1838	Andrés de Santa Cruz	As Plenipotentiary Minister of the Peru–Bolivian Confederation in Ecuador
José Maruri de la Cuba		1839	1839	Agustín Gamarra	As Plenipotentiary Minister of Peru in Ecuador
Matías León		1841	1842	Agustín Gamarra	As Minister Plenipotentiary and Envoy Extraordinary of Peru in Ecuador
Cipriano Coronel Zegarra		1845	1848	Ramón Castilla	As Chargé d'Affaires of Peru in Ecuador
Manuel de Icaza		1848	1850	Ramón Castilla	As Consul in Charge of the Legation of Peru in Ecuador
Francisco de Paula Moreyra		1851	1852	José Rufino Echenique	As Chargé d'Affaires and General Consul of Peru in Ecuador
Mariano José Sanz León		1853	1855	José Rufino Echenique	As Plenipotentiary Minister of Peru in Ecuador
Juan Celestino Cavero		1857	1859	Ramón Castilla	As Resident Minister of Peru in Ecuador
Manuel Nicolás Corpancho		1860	1860	Ramón Castilla	As Interim Chargé d'Affaires of Peru in Ecuador
José Antonio Barrenechea y Morales		1864	1864	Juan Antonio Pezet	As Chargé d'Affaires of Peru in Ecuador
Manuel Benjamín Cisneros		1865	1865	Juan Antonio Pezet	As Resident Minister and Chargé d'Affaires of Peru in Ecuador
José Luis Quiñones		1865	1867	Mariano Ignacio Prado	As Extraordinary Envoy and Plenipotentiary Minister of Peru in Ecuador
José Manuel Suárez		1866	1868	Mariano Ignacio Prado	As Interim Chargé d'Affaires of Peru in Ecuador
Mariano Electro Corso		1868	1870	Pedro Diez Canseco	As Chargé d'Affaires of Peru in Ecuador
José Vicente Ampuero		1870	1873	José Balta	As Chargé d'Affaires of Peru in Ecuador
Juan Francisco Zelaya		1873	1876	Manuel Pardo	As Chargé d'Affaires of Peru in Ecuador
Miguel Riofrío		1877	1877	Mariano Ignacio Prado	As Chargé d'Affaires of Peru in Ecuador
Nicolás Vásquez de Velasco		1877	1878	Mariano Ignacio Prado	As manager of the Legation of Peru in Ecuador
Emilio Bonifaz		April 1879	February 1880	Mariano Ignacio Prado	As Resident Minister of Peru in Ecuador
Juan Luna		February 1880	December 1880	Nicolás de Piérola	As Extraordinary Envoy and Minister Plenipotentiary of Peru in the United States of Colombia, Venezuela and Ecuador
Manuel Antonio de Reyna		1883	1884	Miguel Iglesias	As Resident Minister of Peru in Ecuador, Colombia and Venezuela
Emilio Bonifaz		1886	1888	Andrés Avelino Cáceres	As Extraordinary Envoy and Plenipotentiary Minister of Peru in Ecuador, Colombia and Venezuela
Arturo García		1888	1891	Andrés Avelino Cáceres	As Extraordinary Envoy and Plenipotentiary Minister of Peru in Ecuador
Alberto Ulloa Cisneros		1890	1893	Andrés Avelino Cáceres	As Interim Chargé d'Affaires of Peru in Ecuador
Enrique Zevallos y Cisneros		1893	1895	Andrés Avelino Cáceres	As Interim Chargé d'Affaires of Peru in Ecuador
Emilio Bonifaz		1893	1895	Andrés Avelino Cáceres	As Extraordinary Envoy and Plenipotentiary Minister of Peru in Ecuador
Enrique Bustamante y Salazar		1895	1900	Eduardo López de Romaña	As Extraordinary Envoy and Plenipotentiary Minister of Peru in Ecuador
Aurelio Souza		1900	1901	Eduardo López de Romaña	As Extraordinary Envoy and Plenipotentiary Minister of Peru in Ecuador
Eduardo J. Bueno		1901	1902	Eduardo López de Romaña	As Chargé d'Affaires of Peru in Ecuador
Melitón Porras Osores		1902	1903	Eduardo López de Romaña	As Extraordinary Envoy and Plenipotentiary Minister of Peru in Ecuador
Mariano H. Cornejo		1904	1905	Manuel Candamo	As Extraordinary Envoy and Plenipotentiary Minister of Peru in Ecuador
Arturo García Salazar		1904	1909	Manuel Candamo	As Interim Chargé d'Affaires of Peru in Ecuador
Germán Leguía y Martínez		1909	1912	Augusto B. Leguía	As Extraordinary Envoy and Plenipotentiary Minister of Peru in Ecuador
Alberto Bresani Rosel		1909	1915	Augusto B. Leguía	As Interim Chargé d'Affaires of Peru in Ecuador
Alberto Rey de Castro y Romaña		1916	1920	José Pardo y Barreda	As Extraordinary Envoy and Plenipotentiary Minister of Peru in Ecuador
Ernesto Tezanos Pinto		1920	1921	Augusto B. Leguía	As Extraordinary Envoy and Plenipotentiary Minister of Peru in Ecuador
Víctor M. Maúrtua		1922	1923	Augusto B. Leguía	As Extraordinary Envoy and Plenipotentiary Minister of Peru in Ecuador
Enrique Castro Oyanguren		1924	1929	Augusto B. Leguía	As Plenipotentiary Minister of Peru in Ecuador
Germán Aramburú Lecaros		1926	1928	Augusto B. Leguía	As Chargé d'Affaires of Peru in Ecuador
Ricardo Rivera Schreiber		1929	1929	Augusto B. Leguía	As Ambassador of Peru in Extraordinary Mission for the inauguration of the President of Ecuador
Ricardo Rivera Schreiber		1929	1930	Augusto B. Leguía	As Extraordinary Envoy and Plenipotentiary Minister of Peru in Ecuador
Arturo García Salazar		1930	1936	Luis Miguel Sánchez Cerro	As Extraordinary Envoy and Plenipotentiary Minister of Peru in Ecuador
Enrique Goytisolo Bolognesi		1936	1941	Óscar R. Benavides	As Extraordinary Envoy and Plenipotentiary Minister of Peru in Ecuador
G. Víctor Proaño C.		1939	1942	Óscar R. Benavides	As Interim Chargé d'Affaires of Peru in Ecuador
Hernán C. Bellido		1942	1945	Manuel Prado Ugarteche	Extraordinary and Plenipotentiary Ambassador of Peru in Ecuador
Hernán C. Bellido		1945	1945	Manuel Prado Ugarteche	As Extraordinary Envoy and Plenipotentiary Minister of Peru in Ecuador
Manuel Danino Cantuarias		1946	1947	José Luis Bustamante y Rivero	As Interim Chargé d'Affaires of Peru in Ecuador
Juan Ignacio Elguera		1947	1948	José Luis Bustamante y Rivero	As Extraordinary and Plenipotentiary Ambassador of Peru in Ecuador
Emilio Romero Padilla		1949	1950	Manuel A. Odría	As Extraordinary and Plenipotentiary Ambassador of Peru in Ecuador
Teodosio Cabada		1951	1952	Manuel A. Odría	As Extraordinary and Plenipotentiary Ambassador of Peru in Ecuador
Gonzalo N. de Aramburú		1952	1953	Manuel A. Odría	As Extraordinary and Plenipotentiary Ambassador of Peru in Ecuador
Guillermo F. Mendoza Serrano		1954	1955	Manuel A. Odría	As Interim Chargé d'Affaires of Peru in Ecuador
Cesar Elejalde Chopitea		1956	1960	Manuel A. Odría	As Extraordinary and Plenipotentiary Ambassador of Peru in Ecuador
Gustavo Barreda M. A.		1961	1961	Manuel Prado Ugarteche	As Interim Chargé d'Affaires of Peru in Ecuador
J. Orville Pérez Villarreal		1962	1963	Manuel Prado Ugarteche	As Interim Chargé d'Affaires of Peru in Ecuador
Arturo García y García		1964	1965	Fernando Belaúnde	As Extraordinary and Plenipotentiary Ambassador of Peru in Ecuador
Bernardo Roca Rey		1966	1967	Fernando Belaúnde	As Interim Chargé d'Affaires of Peru in Ecuador
Juan Miguel Bákula		1967	1972	Fernando Belaúnde	As Extraordinary and Plenipotentiary Ambassador of Peru in Ecuador
Jorge Morelli Pando		1972	1977	Juan Velasco Alvarado	As Extraordinary and Plenipotentiary Ambassador of Peru in Ecuador
Arturo García y García		1977	1979	Francisco Morales Bermúdez	As Extraordinary and Plenipotentiary Ambassador of Peru in Ecuador
Jaime Álvarez Calderón		1979	1980	Francisco Morales Bermúdez	As Interim Chargé d'Affaires of Peru in Ecuador
José Carlos Mariátegui A.		1980	1982	Fernando Belaúnde	As Extraordinary and Plenipotentiary Ambassador of Peru in Ecuador
Felipe Valdivieso Belaúnde		1982	1986	Fernando Belaúnde	As Extraordinary and Plenipotentiary Ambassador of Peru in Ecuador
Jorge Morelli Pando		1987	1989	Alan García	As Extraordinary and Plenipotentiary Ambassador of Peru in Ecuador
Eduardo Ponce Vivanco		1990	1994	Alberto Fujimori	As Extraordinary and Plenipotentiary Ambassador of Peru in Ecuador
Hugo Palma Valderrama		1995	1997	Alberto Fujimori	As Extraordinary and Plenipotentiary Ambassador of Peru in Ecuador
Alberto Montagne Vidal		1997	1999	Alberto Fujimori	As Extraordinary and Plenipotentiary Ambassador of Peru in Ecuador
Óscar Maúrtua de Romaña		1999	1999	Alberto Fujimori	As Extraordinary and Plenipotentiary Ambassador of Peru in Ecuador
Luis Marchand Stens		April 23, 2002	July 27, 2006	Alejandro Toledo	As Extraordinary and Plenipotentiary Ambassador of Peru in Ecuador
Vicente Rojas Escalante		2006	2010	Alan García	As Extraordinary and Plenipotentiary Ambassador of Peru in Ecuador
Javier Eduardo León Olavarría		2010	2013	Alan García	As Extraordinary and Plenipotentiary Ambassador of Peru in Ecuador
Elizabeth Astete		2013	2016	Ollanta Humala	
Hugo Otero Lanzerotti		November 28, 2016	November 23, 2018	Pedro Pablo Kuczynski	As Extraordinary and Plenipotentiary Ambassador of Peru in Ecuador
Vicente Rojas Escalante		March 1, 2019	January 27, 2023	Martín Vizcarra	As Extraordinary and Plenipotentiary Ambassador of Peru in Ecuador
José Eduardo Zeballos Valle		March 1, 2023	October 10, 2025	Dina Boluarte	As Extraordinary and Plenipotentiary Ambassador of Peru in Ecuador

== See also ==
- List of ambassadors of Ecuador to Peru
- List of ambassadors of Peru to Colombia
- List of ambassadors of Peru to Venezuela
