= Mae Montaño =

Ecuadorian politician (born 1953)

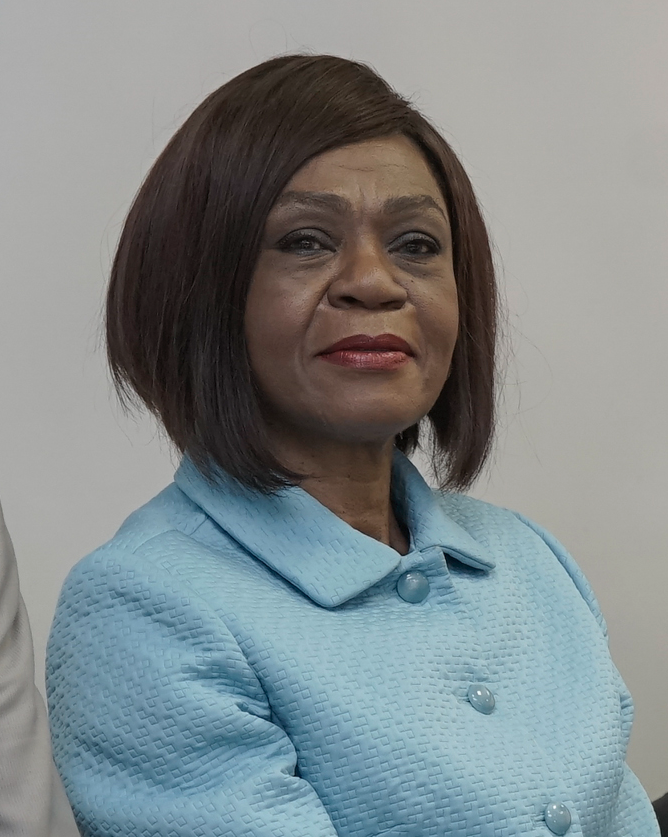

Ecuadorian National Assembly
- Incumbent
- Assumed office May 13, 2014

Ecuadorian Constituent Assembly
- In office November 30, 2007 – October 27, 2008

Personal details
- Born: April 7, 1953 (age 73) Esmeraldas, Ecuador
- Party: A New Option (2006–07); National Democratic Coalition (2007–10); Creating Opportunities (2010–18); Independent (2018–present)
- Education: Luis Vargas Torres Technical University
- Occupation: Politician

Mae Montaño Valencia (born April 7, 1953, Esmeraldas) is an Ecuadorian politician. She has worked for human and women's rights and youth rehabilitation.

== Political career ==
Montaño became the director of A New Option in 2006, for whom she won a seat in the Constituent Assembly in 2007. Later, she helped organize the National Democratic Coalition.

Montaño is one of the founders of the Creating Opportunities (CREO) party, organized in 2010. She was elected to the National Assembly representing CREO in 2013 and 2017. On March 2, 2018, Montaño, dissatisfied with CREO, left the party and became an independent.

=== Odebrecht scandal ===
On June 18, 2018, under Article 131 of the Ecuadorian constitution, Montaño presented a request to the National Assembly for the impeachment of Attorney General Diego García for his role in the Odebrecht scandal, backed by 37 signatures, 23 annexes, and 1467 pieces of evidence. García had already resigned from the Attorney Generalship on January 31, 2018, after a decade at the post, but the Legislative Administration Council, the governing body of the National Assembly, approved the request on September 18, 2018, passing it to the Supervisory Commission the next day.
