= Ximena Garzón =

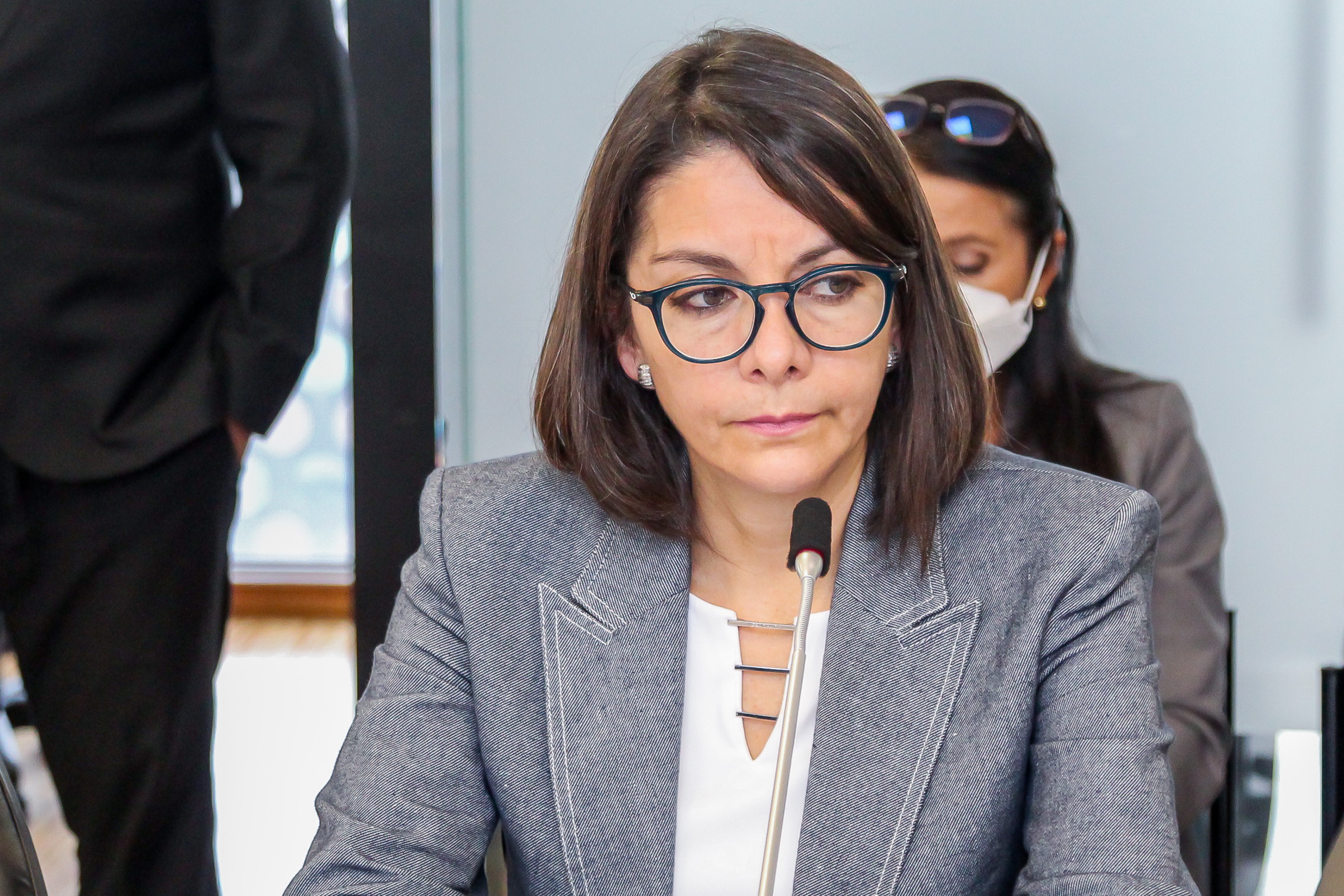
Garzón Villalba in 2021

Ximena Patricia Garzón Villalba (born 11 January 1971) is an Ecuadorian physician, researcher and politician who served as the Minister of Public Health from 2021 until 2022 under the Guillermo Lasso administration. She was born in Quito, Ecuador. On 26 April 2021, then President-elect Lasso nominated Garzón Villalba to serve in his government. She was tasked with carrying out the administration's COVID-19 vaccination rollout during the pandemic in the country.

On 5 July 2022, Garzón Villalba resigned from her position. Following her resignation, Lasso honored her with the National Order of Merit.

== Early life ==
Garzón Villalba was born on 11 July 1971 in Quito, Ecuador. She obtained her medical degree from the Central University of Ecuador before getting her PhD in public health with a concentration in occupational health from the University of South Florida. During her time in Florida, she also did her fellowship in occupational health research and occupational epidemiology there.

Upon completing her education, she became the deputy medical technical director and deputy director of teaching and research at the General Hospital for the South of Quito of the Ecuadorian Institute of Social Security. She also became the general coordinator of teaching at the Carlos Andrade Marín Specialty Hospital. While also doing this she taught as a professor at some Ecuadorian and United States universities on public health, becoming Dean of Public Health at the Universidad San Francisco de Quito (USFQ), while also sitting on board of trustees for advising on pandemics.
