= Paola Flores Jaramillo =

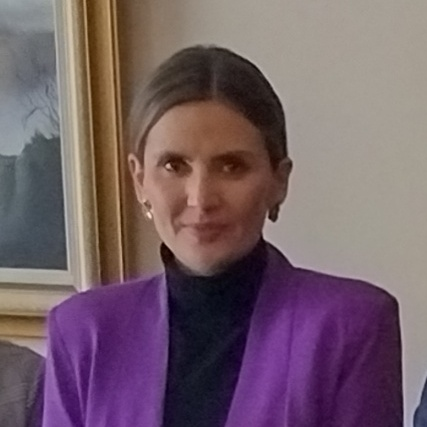
- in 2022
- Education: Technical University of Loja
- Occupations: lawyer and politician
- Known for: Ecuador's Minister of Women and Human Rights in 2022.
- Predecessor: Bernarda Ordóñez Moscoso
- Political party: CREO

Paola Flores Jaramillo is an Ecuadorian politician who became the Secretary of Human Rights and later a Minister of Women and Human Rights in 2022.

== Life ==
Jaramillo attended the Technical University of Loja and she became a lawyer. She was representing the Cuenca canton when she was made the Secretary of Human Rights by President Lasso in May 2022. She resigned her former position. She had succeeded Bernarda Ordóñez Moscoso who resigned citing irreconcilable differences.

Ecuador's government had targeted the reduction/removal of femicide and violence against girls and women. In November 2002 Jaramillo's secretariat became the Ministry of Women and Human Rights. She remained in charge with the rank of Minister.
