= Mauricio Montalvo Samaniego =

Eguadorian diplomat (born 1961)

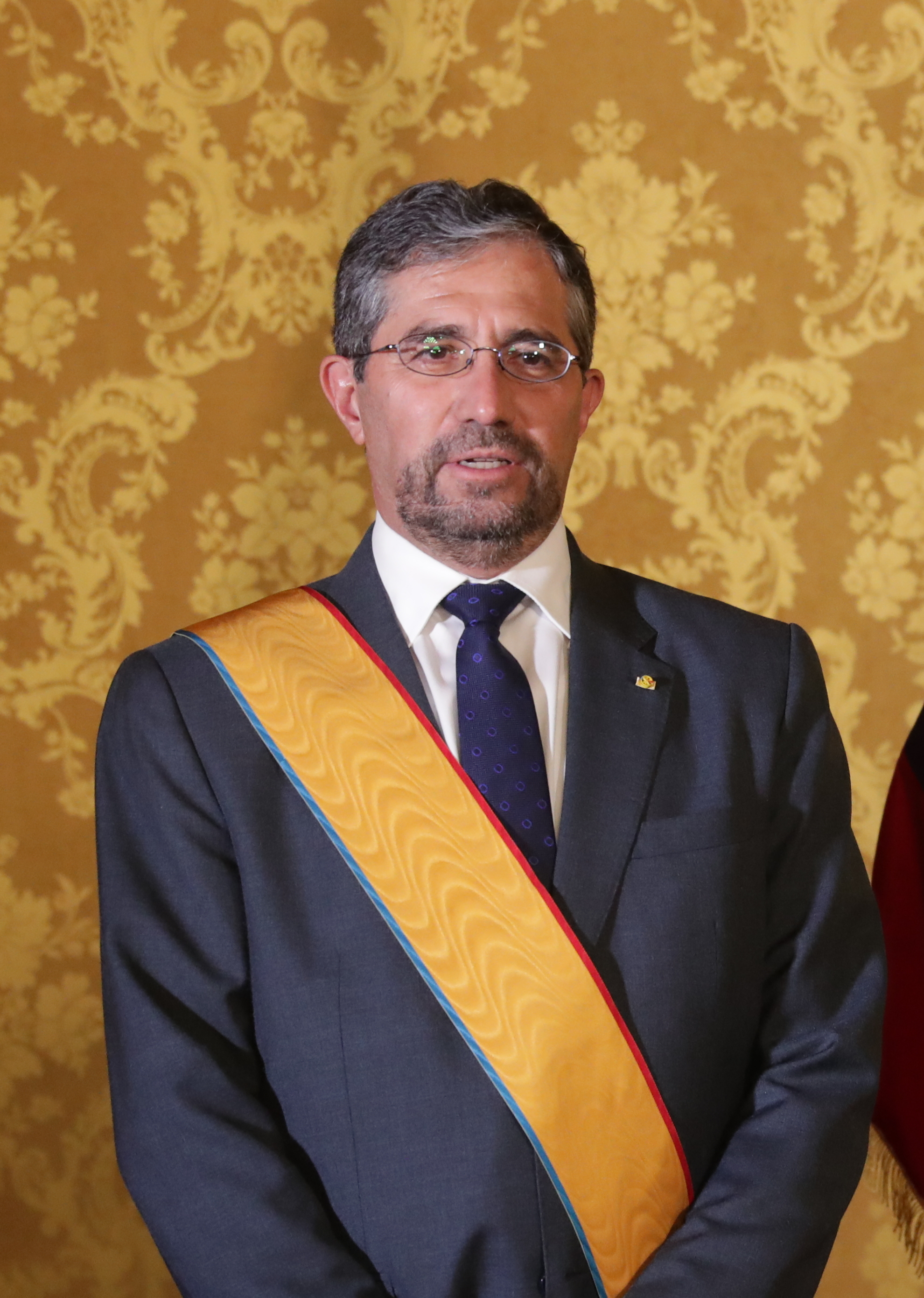

Ecuadorian Minister of Foreign Affairs
- In office 24 May 2021 – 3 January 2022
- Preceded by: Manuel Mejía Dalmau
- Succeeded by: Juan Carlos Holguín

Ecuador Ambassador to United Nations in Geneva
- In office 2006–2011

Ecuador Ambassador to Australia
- In office 2020–2021

Ecuador Ambassador to Organization of American States
- In office 2022–2025

Ecuador Ambassador to South Africa, Angola, Mozambique, Namibia, Kenya and Zimbabwe
- In office 2025–present

Dean of the School of Law and Social Sciences, University of The Americas (UDLA)
- In office 2011–2018

Personal details
- Born: June 26, 1961 (age 65) Ecuador
- Spouse: Irina Oña Lemos
- Education: Harvard Law School École nationale d'administration Pontifical Catholic University of Ecuador
- Profession: Diplomat

Mauricio Montalvo Samaniego (born June 26, 1961) is an Ecuadorean lawyer, diplomat and university professor. He was Minister of Foreign Affairs of Ecuador, holds a LL.M. from Harvard Law School and was Ambassador to the United Nations in Geneva, to Australia and to the Organization of American States (OAS) in Washington DC. Currently, he is the Ambassador of Ecuador to South Africa.

== Early life and education ==
During his university years, he served as the Student Representative to the Academic Council of the Pontificia Universidad Católica del Ecuador (PUCE) in 1983 and later became later became President of the Student Law School Association in 1984.

He graduated with a Doctorate in Jurisprudence (1986), a Law Degree (1986), and a Bachelor's in Legal Sciences (1984) from PUCE. In 1990, he earned a Master of Laws (LL.M.) from Harvard University, where he was a classmate of President Barack Obama. He also holds a Diploma in Public Administration from the École Nationale d'Administration (ENA) in Paris, France (2004), the same year French President Emmanuel Macron graduated from that school.

== Career ==
Montalvo has an extensive academic career, teaching at institutions such as the PUCE Faculty of Jurisprudence, the Central University of Ecuador, the Universidad San Francisco de Quito (USFQ), and the University of Las Américas (UDLA), where he served as Dean from 2011 to 2018. He has also served as a visiting professor at the University of Puerto Rico Law School and as a lecturer at institutions such as IAEN, FLACSO, Universidad Andina, Academia de Guerra, and Escuela Superior de Policía. Throughout his career, he has published numerous scholarly articles on legal and international relations.

His diplomatic service is distinguished by various high-profile positions. Notably, he served as Second Secretary at the Permanent Mission to the Organization of American States (OAS) in Washington, D.C. (1987–1989), First Secretary at the Permanent Mission to the United Nations in New York (1990–1992), and Alternate Permanent Delegate to UNESCO in Paris (1996–2001).

From 2006 to 2011, he was Ecuador's Ambassador and Permanent Representative to the United Nations in Geneva, from 2020 to 2021 he held the post of Ambassador to Australia, with concurrent accreditation to New Zealand and Fiji, and from 2022 to 2025 was the Ambassador, Permanent Representative to the Organization of American States (OAS).

In 2021, he was appointed Ecuador's Minister of Foreign Affairs by President Guillermo Lasso. Currently, Montalvo serves as the Ecuadorian Ambassador to South Africa, with concurrences to Angola, Mozambique, Namibia, Kenya and Zimbabwe.

Within Ecuador, Montalvo has held several significant roles in the Foreign Ministry, as Under-Secretary for International Cooperation, Under-Secretary of International Organizations, Under-Secretary for Multilateral Affairs and General Coordinator of Summits. He has also served as the Director General of Multilateral Policy, Director General of Social Communication (Spokesperson), and Director General of Border Relations with Colombia. Previously he served in the Departments of Consular and Migration Affairs, of the Americas, and of Sovereignty. He was also Secretary of the Ecuadorian Consultative Board for International Relations.

Outside his diplomatic work, Montalvo has been a Legal Advisor to the Ecuadorian Presidency, an Advisor to the Minister of Finance, and a Consultant for the World Bank.

Additionally, he was appointed Under-Secretary General of Public Administration (Deputy Chief of Staff of the Government), showcasing his vast experience in both public service and academia.

== Distinctions ==
- Grand Cross of the National Order of Merit of Ecuador
- Medal of the Inter-American Defense Board
- Grand Cross of the National Order of Merit of Chile
- Cavalieri of the Order of Solidarity of Italy

== Published work ==
He is co-author of the book "El camino a la integración desde la identidad: Una aproximación suramericana" with the Ecuadorian political scientist Bernardo Gortaire Morejón. In this book, the authors study the importance of identity in the construction of stronger and more successful regional integration processes.
