= Bernarda Ordóñez =

Ecuadorian politician

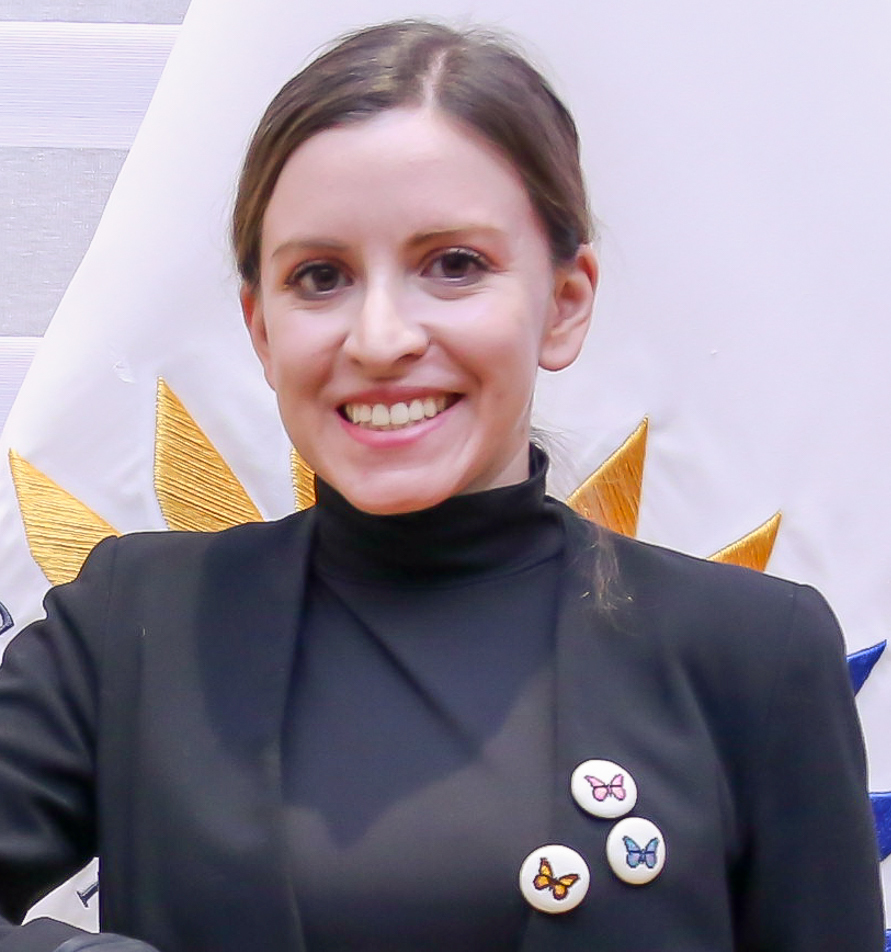
Bernarda Ordoñez Moscoso in 2021.

Bernarda Ordóñez Moscoso is an Ecuadorian politician.

== Political career ==
She was a candidate for the 2021 general election in Azuay Province.

In 2021, she was appointed to the Cabinet of Ecuador as Minister of Justice, with responsibility to lead the Human Rights Secretariat. In April 2022, she resigned from the position. She was replaced by Paola Flores Jaramillo.
