= Alfonso Barrera Valverde =

Ecuadorian writer and diplomat

Alfonso Barrera Valverde (29 March 1929 – 6 September 2013) was an Ecuadorian writer and diplomat. He was born in Ambato in 1929, the sixth of seven siblings. The family moved to Quito, where the young Alfonso studied at the Colegio La Salle and then at the Central University of Ecuador. He also did postgraduate studies at Harvard University.

Starting his career at the foreign ministry, he rose to be ambassador to the Dominican Republic, then under the dictatorship of Leonidas Trujillo. He also served as Ecuador's ambassador to Spain, Canada, Germany and Argentina. In 1980, he was appointed Minister of Foreign Affairs by President Jaime Roldós Aguilera. He was minister during the 1981 Paquisha incident on the Peruvian border. He turned down an offer to run for president, concentrating on the ministry where he spent a total of 49 years.

As a writer of fiction, poetry and non-fiction, he was regarded as a writer of national importance. Some of his notable works include his account of the Paquisha conflict, Hombres de paz en lucha (1982), the children's novel El país de Manuelito (1984) and Sancho Panza en América (2006).

He died on 6 September 2013 at the age of 84.
