= Jorge Salvador Lara =

Ecuadorian politician diplomat, columnist, writer, and historian

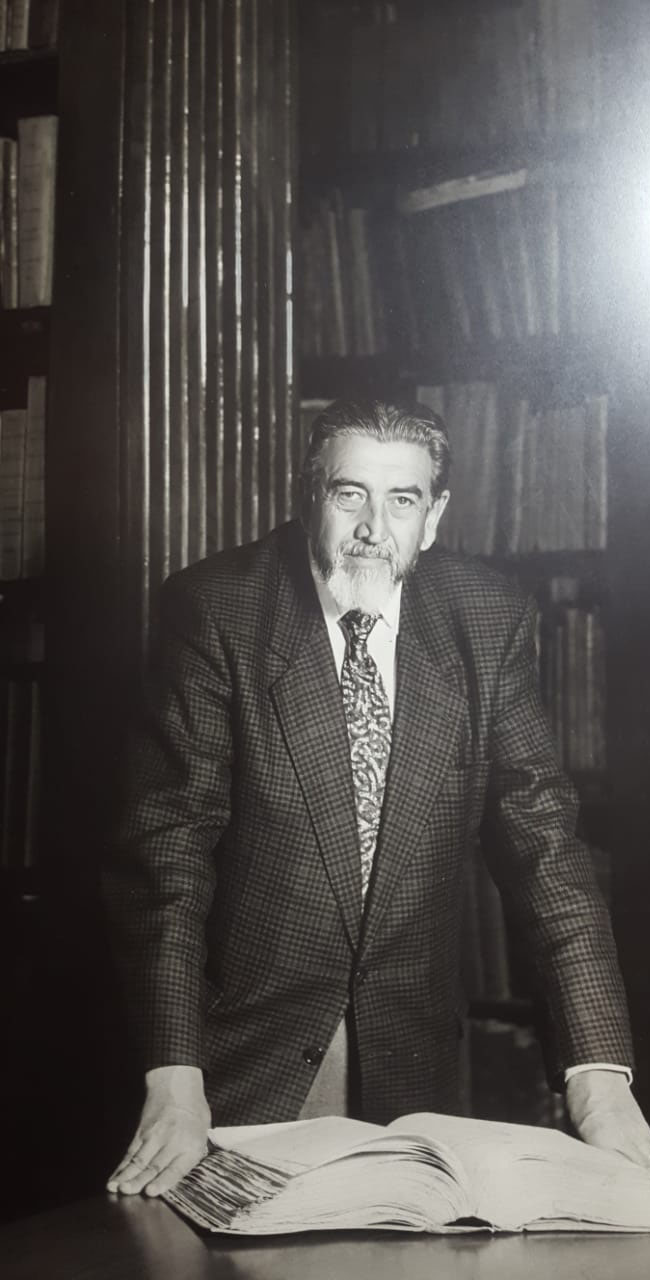

Ecuadorian Foreign minister
- In office 1966–1966

Ecuadorian Foreign minister
- In office 1977–1978

Ecuadorian Ambassador to the Holy See
- In office 1983–1984
- Preceded by: Manuel De Guzmán Polanco
- Succeeded by: Francisco Alfredo Salazar Alvarado

Personal details
- Born: 4 September 1926 Quito, Ecuador
- Died: 8 February 2012 (aged 85)

Jorge Salvador Lara (September 4, 1926 – February 8, 2012) was an Ecuadorian politician diplomat, columnist, writer, and historian. Lara served as the foreign minister of Ecuador for two separate tenures. He first served as foreign minister in 1966 within the government of interim president Clemente Yerovi. Lara again became foreign minister from 1976 to 1977 within the military regime of Vice Admiral Alfredo Poveda.

Lara was born in Quito, Ecuador, on September 4, 1926, to Jorge Salvador Donoso and Josefina Lara Bueno. His parents introduced him to history, while Lara eventually studied under Father Aurelio Espinosa Pólit, the founder of Pontificia Universidad Católica del Ecuador.

Lara worked as an Ecuadorian diplomat. He was appointed Ambassador of Ecuador to the Holy See, Peru, Chile, and the Unesco in Paris. Lara also served as the director of the Academy of National History (Academia Nacional de Historia) for twenty years, as well as the president of the Institute of Geography and History (Instituto de Geografía e Historia). He had originally earned a fellowship within the Academy of National History on June 27, 1967. Lara was considered a leading historian and expert on the history of the capital city, Quito. In addition to his numerous books and publications, Lara taught history at Pontificia Universidad Católica del Ecuador, the Ecuador Military Academy, and San Gabriel High School.

Lara became a columnist for the El Comercio on May 11, 1970, at the behest of the newspaper's then director, Jorge Mantilla Ortega.

Jorge Salvador Lara died in Quito on February 8, 2012, at the age of 85.

His son and daughters have held important public positions and Ministers of Foreign Affairs, Ministers of Tourism and General Prosecutor of the State. His grandsons are also worth of mention as Jorge Izquierdo Salvador, a writer and professor.

== Selected books and publications ==
- Semblanza apasionada de Isabel la Católica
- Cuaderno del Combatiente
- La documentación sobre los próceres de la Independencia y la crítica histórica
- Las Ideas Sociales en los pueblos antiguos. Introducción a la Historia de la Sociología
- La Patria heroica
- Escorzos de Historia Patria
- Memoria del Ministro de Relaciones Exteriores
- Discurso del Canciller
