= Insurgency in Ecuador =

Ongoing armed conflict

- Part of the Ecuadorian security crisis
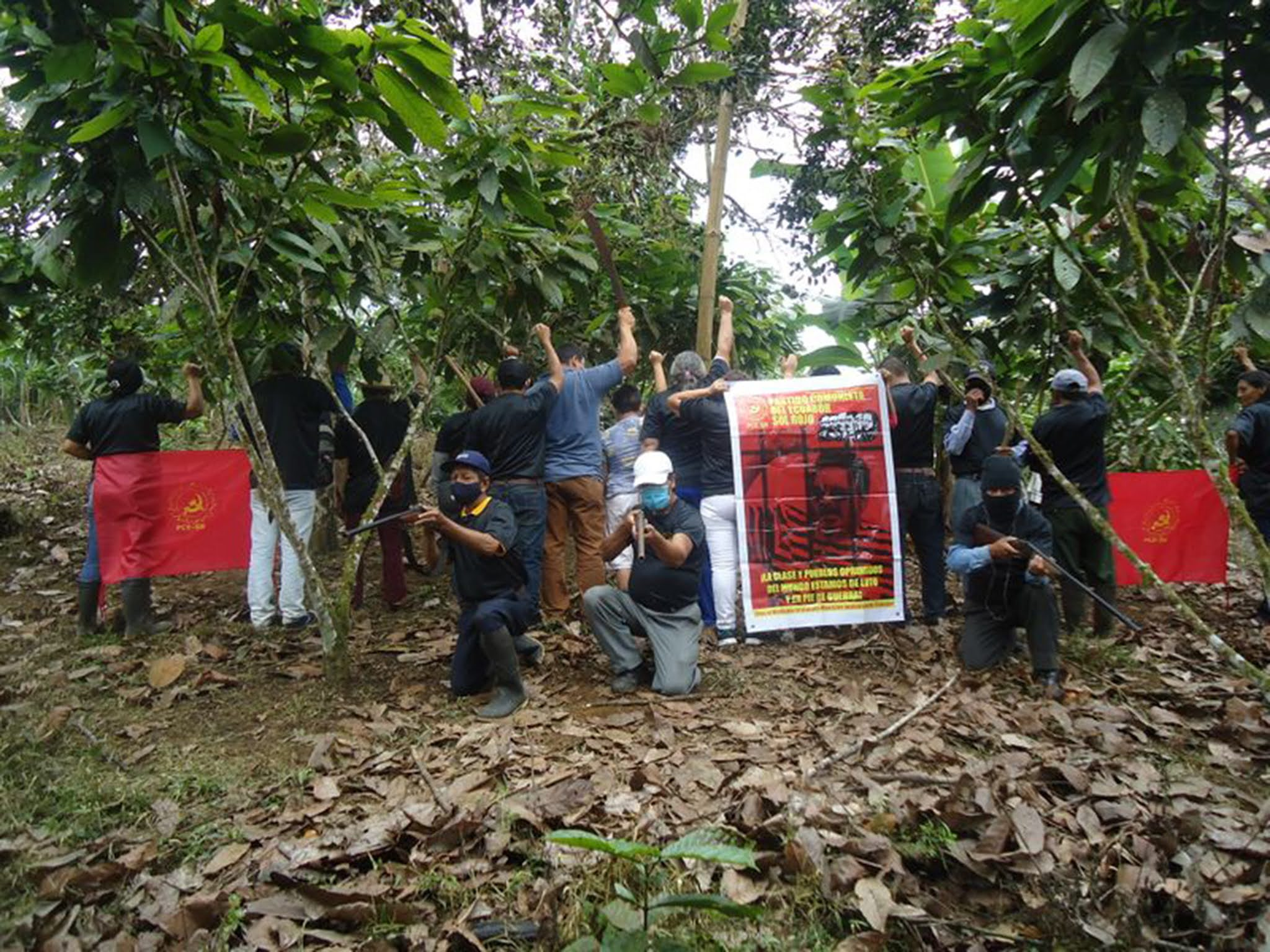
- Group of PCE-SR militants in a forest.
Date	1 June 1993 – Present
Location	Ecuador
Result	Ongoing

Belligerents
Ecuador; Armed Forces of Ecuador; National Police of Ecuador; United States (since 2026)	GCP; PCE-SR (Note: Currently reorganizing); FPLR (until 1994); ELA (2002-2005); FARE; CAR (2001–2008); MRP (2001-2004); IRA (2004); OPM (2004-2005); Comuneros-LN (2006-2017); EGP/N-15 (2009-2012); MRA (2012-2019); FARC dissidents (from 2018); Comandos de la Frontera

Commanders and leaders
(Ecuador) Daniel Noboa; (Ecuador) María José Pinto; Former commanders: (Ecuador) Sixto Durán Ballén; (Ecuador) Abdalá Bucaram; (Ecuador) Fabián Alarcón; (Ecuador) Rosalía Arteaga; (Ecuador) Jamil Mahuad; (Ecuador) Gustavo Noboa; (Ecuador) Lucio Gutiérrez; (Ecuador) Alfredo Palacio; (Ecuador) Rafael Correa; (Ecuador) Lenín Moreno; (Ecuador) Guillermo Lasso; (Ecuador) Alberto Dahik; (Ecuador) Eduardo Peña; (Ecuador) Pedro Aguayo; (Ecuador) Pedro Pinto Rubianes; (Ecuador) Alejandro Serrano; (Ecuador) Jorge Glas; (Ecuador) María Alejandra Vicuña; (Ecuador) Otto Sonnenholzner; (Ecuador) María Alejandra Muñoz; (Ecuador) Alfredo Borrero; (Ecuador) Verónica Abad Rojas; (Ecuador) Sariha Moya; (Ecuador) Cynthia Gellibert	Comrade Joselo (until 2022)

Strength
Unknown	PCE-SR: 1,000 members. FARE: 400 militants

Casualties and losses
Unknown	Unknown

The insurgency in Ecuador is an ongoing armed conflict between communist guerrilla groups and the government of Ecuador. The most prominent groups are the Group of Popular Combatants (GPC), the armed wing of the Marxist–Leninist Communist Party of Ecuador (MLCPE), and the Communist Party of Ecuador – Red Sun (PCE-SR).

It is related to the Colombian Conflict and the Peruvian Internal Conflict, with the Communist Party of Ecuador – Red Sun having ties with other militant groups like Shining Path in Peru.

As of 2006, the PCE-SR have claimed 502 armed actions from 1988 to May 1994.

== Background ==
During the Cold War decades, wars and insurgencies spread over the world. In Latin America, multiple left-wing parties and groups were founded. In Ecuador one of them was the MLCPE.

Before the insurgency, the main guerrilla group in Ecuador was the "¡Alfaro Vive, Carajo!", which operated from 1982 to 1991. In 1991, they made a peace accord with the government of Ecuador, being the first guerrilla group in Latin America to do so.

The economic crisis resulted in an inflationary currency crisis, which enabled the Communist Party of Ecuador – Red Sun to incite violence against other groups and drug traffickers in 1993.

== Insurgency ==
=== Communist Party of Ecuador – Red Sun (PCE-SR) ===
The conflict started with the formation of a supporting Shining Path movement known as the Communist Party of Ecuador – Red Sun (from Spanish: Partido Comunista de Ecuador - Sol Rojo). It is a Maoist guerrilla group, followed by the most influential group: Group of Popular Combatants (GCP). On 1 June 1993, the Communist Party of Ecuador – Red Sun started the conflict and attacked rural areas to the west of Zumba. The group had close ideological and military ties with Shining Path in Peru.

The guerrilla is responsible for skirmishes against the Ecuadorian Army and for indoctrinating the Gonzalo thought in the province of Chimborazo, which in turn serves as the nerve centre of the guerrilla movement. The Communist Party of Ecuador – Red Sun has also been registered in the provinces of Cañar, Tungurahua and Cotopaxi.

The PCE-SR uses sabotage tactics; they attacked banks, Peruvian embassy in Ecuador, courts, transport drivers in multiple operations, and political parties.

The PCE-SR claims that the Ecuadorean Army conducted a campaign in Guayaquil involving 2,000 troops, helicopters, tankettes, and gunboats. The soldiers enter a Guayaquil suburb (38th and K) to dismantle the "Red Sun subversive fabric" of theirs. The repressive operation left some dead, several detainees, and captured many military and quartermaster materials.

==== Operation Red Sun ====
On 3 March, 2012, 10 alleged members of the Group of Popular Combatants were arrested and charged with subversion and terrorism. The PCE-SR condemned this as an escalation of repression by the Ecuadorian state. The case itself, which became known as the "Luluncoto 10," would become controversial over the process of criminalizing political groups as terrorist organizations. Months later, the PCE-SR ruled on the forced disappearance of 43 students in Ayotzinapa, calling it a state crime and accusing President Enrique Peña Nieto of being in charge of a narco-state. In October 2014, the PCE-SR announced its solidarity with the Popular Protection Units for the defense carried out in the siege of Kobane.

=== Group of Popular Combatants (GCP) ===
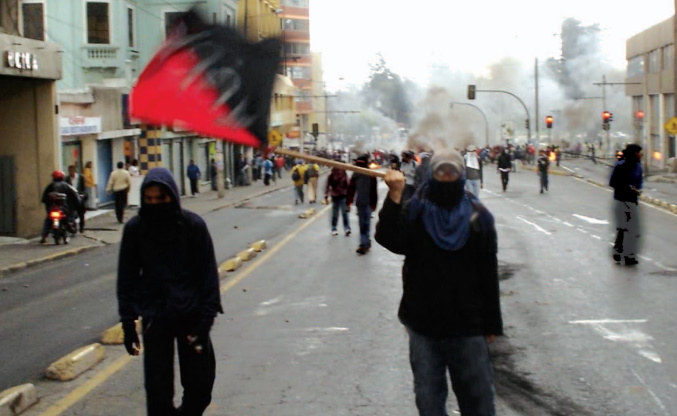
GCP Protesters.

The Group of Popular Combatants (from Spanish"' Grupos de Combatientes Populares'") was formed in 1994, during the presidency of Sixto Durán Ballén. It became much more active in the 2000s, and since then, it has participated in a series of attacks against foreign diplomats, as well as several bomb attacks.

GCP committed an attack on 28 September, 1997, in Quito. No one was injured or killed in the attack.

Another GCP attack occurred on 16 February, 2000, in Guayaquil. A television network received a videotape that contained a concealed bomb. The civil Rafael Cuesta, the news editor at the station, and the only casualty in the attack, was wounded when the bomb went off inside the station. Before the attack, the news station had warnings about a possible attack from a different group, This initially led authorities to blame a different organization. However, the Group of Popular Combatants did eventually take responsibility. Rafael Cuesta was the only person injured, and no one was killed.

In 2002, it was reported that the Group of Popular Combatants was attempting to establish a rural base in a remote jungle region bordering Colombia and that they may have been receiving training from some of the guerrilla groups involved in the Colombian conflict.

The GCP claimed that, in its system, the combatants accumulate revolutionary merits; they strive to contribute through initiatives so that the organization develops, advances, expresses itself democratically, and responsibly fulfils the resolutions adopted by the groups and the leadership teams. Those who accumulate more merits serve on provincial leadership teams and are democratically elected by an assembly.

On 22 November, 2010, the GCP claimed responsibility for a bomb attack on the head office of the University of Guayaquil. The GCP claimed they used the bomb to attempt to influence student elections held at the university.

The GCP claimed on 6 December, 2010, to have presence in Azuay Province and to be in solidarity with the population against the troops of the police army and the air force in the province.

On 3 March 2012, 10 alleged members of the GCP were arrested and charged with subversion and terrorism. The PCE-SR condemned this as an escalation of repression by the Ecuadorian state. The case itself, which became known as the "Luluncoto 10," would become controversial over the process of criminalizing political groups as terrorist organizations.

=== Alfarist Liberation Army (ELA) ===
The Alfarist Liberation Army (ELA) (from Spanish' Ejército de Liberación Alfarista') was another combatant in the conflict, of which little information is known.

This group is said to have resumed the "revolutionary armed struggle" and infiltrated, in Quito, the popular and student demonstrations that led to the fall of the government of Lucio Gutiérrez.

Intelligence reports from the Ecuadorian government suggest that ELA's contacts with people from Venezuela are not only certain but frequent, and include some meetings that would have taken place in Quito itself, such as those that served to launch a clandestinely printed magazine, entitled Liberación.

=== Revolutionary Armed Forces of Ecuador (FARE) ===
The Revolutionary Armed Forces of Ecuador (FARE) (from Spanish' Fuerzas Armadas Revolucionarias de Ecuador') is another group with very little information.

Allegedly, this group is 400 men strong and has been trained and equipped by the FARC. It is held responsible for a 2003 bomb attack in Guayaquil. The Ministry of Defence believes that the FARE does not pose a security threat, but the Ecuadorian police view it as a problem.

On 22 July, 2002, The Freedom House stated that Colombian right-wing paramilitary groups had "infiltrated northern Ecuador" to "target locals there who they believed might be cooperating with the guerrillas".

On 22 November, 2011, FARE set two separate bombs that exploded nearly simultaneously in downtown Guayaquil, the first of which went off in front of the local Ministry of Health offices, while the second detonated several blocks away.

=== Amazonic Revolutionary Command (CAR) ===
The Amazonic Revolutionary Command (from Spanish' Comando Amazónico Revolucionario') (CAR) was another group in the conflict. On May 29, 2005, CAR exploded a leaflet bomb in the city of Macas. The incident occurred at 11:35 a.m. when members of the Ecuadorian Army stationed in the 21st Condor Brigade in Patuca were participating in the civic parade in honour of the founding celebrations of Macas.

=== FARC dissidents ===
After the FARC dissolved itself in 2016, its dissidents started operating in Ecuador, in border towns with Colombia.

The Washington Office on Latin America (WOLA) claimed that Colombian paramilitary officers in Lago Agrio, Sucumbios province, have been known to have local taxi drivers and citizens "working for them as informants regarding FARC guerrilla movements in the area".

In March, April, and May 2018, the FARC dissidents attacked border towns with Colombia in Mataje, San Lorenzo and Tobar Donoso. They also attacked Puerto Mestanza in January 2019.

On March 6, 2026, Ecuador, with direct United States participation, conducted "Operation Total Extermination" in which the U.S. and Ecuador bombed Comandos de la Frontera, a group of FARC dissidents along the Colombian border, who are accused of drug smuggling. It was not clear how many were killed or captured. Still, it has been reported that the Commandos had a capacity of 50 people, according to Ecuador's defence ministry. This marks the first instance of a direct military participation by the United States in the Ecuadorian conflict. It was later clarified by USSOUTHCOM that the strike specifically targeted one of the hideout for the Comandos current leader Mono Tole, which also served as a training center for Comandos' drug trafickers.
