= Economic history of Ecuador =

The economic history of Ecuador covers the development of Ecuador's economy throughout its history, beginning with colonization by the Spanish Empire, through independence and up to the 21st century. The Ecuador economy has historically and into the present been highly reliant on exports of primary resources. This has contributed to boom-and-bust cycles, as the economy fluctuates with shifts in resource prices. In the modern era, the Ecuador economy has been particularly affected by oil prices.

Colonial Ecuador relied on agriculture rather than mining that dominated the capitals of the Viceroys of Peru and Nueva Granada. The temperate climate of the Sierra was ideal for crop cultivation and the Costa became a top producer of cash crops, with Ecuador being one of the leading producers of cacao.

Ecuador's post-independence economy relied on a system of peonage by natives on lands of the plantation owners. The economy remained reliant on cash crops. It was subject to fluctuations corresponding with the international market, and instability was common. By the 1950s bananas had replaced cocoa beans as Ecuador's main export crop. After the 1950s, Ecuador's economy began experiencing a period of growth. Agriculture's importance in the economy shrank as the manufacturing and service sector of the economy grew. The discovery of petroleum in the eastern region of the country and natural gas in the Gulf of Guayaquil brought a large growth to government revenue, and rapid economic growth. The economic growth resulted in inflation, and the external debt of the country increased by 15 times in a period of 5 years.

With the fall of oil prices in the 1980s, the economy declined with traditional agricultural products losing market. The damage caused by El Niño from 1982–83 damaged farms and infrastructure. Pressure caused by inflation and foreign credit disappearing led to a shortage of government capital. An austerity program including the devaluation of the sucre proved unpopular domestically but allowed Ecuador to negotiate debt repayment with the International Monetary Fund and receive financial aid. By 1984 the economy had largely recovered, so Ecuador withdrew from the OPEC in order to increase oil revenue. A drop in international oil prices hurt the economy which was heavily reliant on petroleum production by this point. To remedy this, president León Febres Cordero entered office promising economic deregulation. He achieved this by reducing import quota and tariffs while encouraging foreign investment. The GDP growth rate recovered, but a drop in petroleum export prices led to a fiscal deficit and the economy neared crisis.

The 1987 Ecuador earthquakes destroyed large parts of the Trans-Ecuadorian Pipeline and oil production ceased for six months. The economy took a heavy hit as the older agricultural industries could not make up for the lack of petroleum profits. The government raised domestic gas prices by 80% and Ecuador acquired international loans to save the ailing economy. The election of Febres Cordero's rival Rodrigo Borja brought a period of government involvement in the economy. His national economic austerity program did little to help the already declining economy and proved unpopular among the populace resulting in strikes. Borja continued with his anti-inflationary program, but implemented economic liberalization programs to reduce criticism of his policies.

In 1992 the election of Sixto Durán led to the successful implementation of a few modernization reforms. His successor Abdalá Bucaram promised populist economic reforms, but they never came to be before he was unseated by Congress. The economy deteriorated in the second half of the decade leading to a financial crisis in 1999. President Jamil Mahuad announced the implementation of the U.S dollar as Ecuador's currency leading to coup d'état and his replacement with vice-president Gustavo Noboa. Noboa successfully implemented the dollar and Ecuador negotiated a stand-by program with the IMF. Ecuador's economy was slightly boosted by the heightening of oil prices from 2000-01.

Ecuador experienced economic growth over the period 2000–2014, owing to higher oil prices. The decline in oil prices from 2014 onwards (in particular during the COVID pandemic) substantially reduced GDP per capita (2019 GDP per capita was 6% lower than 2014 GDP per capita).

== Colonial Ecuador ==
Colonial Ecuador was governed first by the Viceroyalty of Peru and then by the Viceroyalty of Nueva Granada. Ecuador differed significantly from the viceroyalty centers (Lima and Bogotá), however, in that mining never became a vital part of the economy. Instead, crop cultivation and livestock raising dominated the economy, especially in the Sierra. The Sierra's temperate climate was ideal for producing barley, wheat, and corn. The Costa became one of the world's leading producers of cacao. Sugarcane, bananas, coconuts, tobacco, and cotton also were grown in the Costa for export purposes. Foreign commerce expanded gradually during the eighteenth century, but agricultural exports remained paramount. Manufacturing never became a significant economic activity in colonial Ecuador, but busy sweatshops, called obrajes, in Riobamba and Latacunga made Ecuador an exporter of woolen and cotton fabrics; a shipyard in Guayaquil was one of the largest and best in Spanish America; and sugar mills manufactured sugar, molasses, and rum made from molasses.

== 1830–1950 ==
Ecuador gained complete independence in 1830, it had a largely rural population of about one-half million. The rural economy came to rely on a system of peonage, in which Sierra and Costa Indians were allowed to settle on the lands belonging to the hacendado, to whom they paid rent in the form of labor and a share of their crop. The economy of the new republic, based on the cultivation of cash crops and inexpensive raw materials for the world market and dependent on peonage labor, changed little during the remainder of the nineteenth and first half of the twentieth century. Vulnerable to changing international market demands and price fluctuations, Ecuador's economy was often characterized by instability and malaise.

The Ecuador economy was in crisis from the early 1920s to the late 1940s. Cacao exports halved from 1920 to 1923 due to disease. The Great Depression led to reduced value for Ecuadorian exports.

During the second half of the nineteenth century, cacao production nearly tripled, and total exports increased tenfold. As a result, the Costa became the country's center of economic activity. Guayaquil dominated banking, commercial, and export-import affairs. During the first two decades of the twentieth century, cacao exports continued to be the mainstay of the economy and the principal source of foreign exchange, but other agricultural products like coffee and sugar and fish products were also important exports. The decline of the cacao industry in the 1930s and 1940s, brought about by chronic pestilence and the loss of foreign markets to competitors, had debilitating repercussions for the entire economy. During the 1950s, government-sponsored replanting efforts contributed to a partial revival of the cacao industry, so that by 1958 Ecuador was the world's sixth leading exporter of cacao.

As cacao dominated the coast, the Andean region continued to produce for local consumption, and opposed free trade, as its agriculture and textile industries depended on economic protections from foreign competitors. Around the time that cacao became central to the national economy, Ecuador's Amazon region became dominated by the rubber boom. Unlike cacao, rubber did not produce much local development nor strengthen the state. The central government did try to expand its power over the Amazon region in order to take advantage of rubber export revenues. Like elsewhere in Amazonia, the rubber boom included violent enslavement of local people.

There was a banana boom in the 1940s. By the early 1950s bananas had replaced cocoa beans as the country's primary export crop.

== 1950–1980 ==
The Ecuadorian economy made great strides after 1950, when annual exports, 90 percent of which were agricultural, were valued at less than US$30 million, and foreign-exchange reserves stood at about US$15 million. Between 1950 and 1970, a slow, steady expansion of nonagricultural activities took place, especially in the construction, utilities, and services sectors. Construction, for example, made up only 3 percent of the GDP in 1950, but it contributed 7.6 percent to the GDP in 1971. Agriculture's annual share of the GDP was 38.8 percent in 1950 compared with a 24.7 percent share in 1971.

The 1960s saw an acceleration and diversification of the manufacturing sector to meet domestic demand, with an emphasis on intermediate inputs and consumer durable goods. By 1971 these accounted for about 50 percent of industrial output. Still, manufactured products—mainly processed agricultural goods—made up only about 10 percent of Ecuador's exports in 1971. Industry was still at an early stage of development, and about 50 percent of the labor force worked in agriculture, forestry, and fishing. Traditional industries, such as food processing, beverages, and textiles, were largely dependent on agriculture. The small size of the domestic market, the high production cost in relation to available external markets, and an undeveloped human, physical, and financial infrastructure all combined to limit the expansion of consumer durable goods in the Ecuadorian economy.

The discovery of new petroleum fields in the Oriente (eastern region) after 1967 transformed the country into a world producer of oil and brought large increases in government revenue beginning in 1972. That year saw the completion of the Trans-Ecuadorian Pipeline, a 503-kilometer-long oil pipeline leading from the Oriente to the port city of Esmeraldas. A refinery also was constructed just south of Esmeraldas. In addition, in 1970 large quantities of natural gas deposits were discovered in the Gulf of Guayaquil. Largely because of petroleum exports, Ecuador's net foreign-exchange earnings climbed from US$43 million in 1971 to over US$350 million in 1974.

The production and export of oil that began in the early 1970s, coupled with dramatic international price increases for petroleum, contributed significantly to unprecedented economic growth. Real GDP increased by an average of more than 9 percent per year during 1970 to 1977 as compared with only 5.9 percent from 1960 to 1970. The manufacturing sector alone experienced a 12.9 percent average annual GDP real growth rate during 1975–77. Ecuador became a lower middle-income country, although it remained one of the poorer countries of South America. Economic growth had negative side effects, however. Real imports increased by an annual average of 7 percent between 1974 and 1979; this spawned an inflationary pattern that eroded income. During the same period, the country's external debt grew from US$324 million to about US$4.5 billion.

== 1980–1990 ==
In the early 1980s, the economy faltered as the international price of petroleum began a gradual decline and the country lost some foreign markets for its traditional agricultural products. Dramatic climatic changes caused by El Niño during 1982-83 produced coastal floods, torrential rains, and severe drought, which were highly damaging to crops and to the transportation and marketing infrastructures. The economy also began to feel the pinch of the country's growing external debt, which amounted to US$8.4 billion in 1984. Debt servicing in that year absorbed approximately 60 percent of the country's export earnings. Foreign sources of credit began to dry up as early as 1982, leaving the national government and hundreds of state-owned companies short of capital. Inflationary pressures mounted during the early 1980s; consumer prices, which rose 14 percent in 1980, increased by 25 percent in 1982 and by 53 percent in 1983.

In March 1983, the government, with an eye toward rescheduling the external debt, introduced several austerity measures, including a second devaluation of the sucre in two years, this time a 21-percent devaluation of the sucre, a 16-percent rise in the commercial interest rate, and a deceleration of government spending. The government's stabilization program, which included new exchange controls and the reduction of fuel and export subsidies, was unpopular domestically, but it enabled Ecuador to successfully negotiate a new debt repayment schedule with the International Monetary Fund, which also proved willing to grant Ecuador an additional US$107 million in financial assistance. The government, after several months of negotiation, also concluded multiyear rescheduling agreements with foreign private banks in December 1984 and with the Paris Club (a financial consortium of Western banks and governments) in April 1985. By successfully refinancing nearly all of the public-sector debt, the government narrowly avoided defaulting on payments, and, for the period 1985–89, the external debt service ratio was reduced from 60 percent of export earnings to a manageable 30 percent. From 1985 until the beginning of 1987, Ecuador paid only the interest on its external debt.

The Ecuadorian economy recovered during 1984, partly as a result of temporary stability in the international price of crude oil and partly because of a rebound in the agricultural sector. By late 1984, the balance-of-payments current account, which had reflected a US$58 million deficit in 1983, had a US$19 million credit, and the trade surplus reached US$1 billion. The real GDP growth rate was 4 percent, nearly a 7-percent increase over 1983. These improvements in the economy, combined with wage restraints and a tight national government budget, made it possible to reduce the inflation rate in 1984 to 25 percent; for the next two years, the inflation rate was contained at about 24 percent.

In 1985 Ecuador withdrew for one year from the Organization of Petroleum Exporting Countries (OPEC) in order to free itself from that organization's export quotas and thus increase oil export revenue. In 1984 petroleum had accounted for about 70 percent of all commodity exports and about 50 percent of the central government's revenues. In 1985 Ecuador earned over US$1.8 billion in revenue from petroleum exports, two-thirds of Ecuador's export revenue that year. But a sharp decline in international oil prices in 1986 resulted in a US$1.1-billion drop in petroleum export revenue. The balance-of-payments current account, which registered a surplus of US$149 million in 1985, showed a US$613-million deficit for 1986. Foreign-exchange reserves declined to US$145 million by mid-1986, and real GDP growth for 1986 came to only 1.7 percent, compared with 3.8 percent in 1985. To meet the economic crisis, in January 1987 the government suspended debt repayments to all private lending institutions and imposed a 25-percent surcharge on many imported items.

León Febres Cordero had entered office promising prosperity and neoliberal economic reforms featuring governmental efficiency, a free-enterprise approach in managing the economy, and a free-market exchange system that would promote economic deregulation. To fulfill these promises, Febres Cordero removed government price controls, devalued the currency, and eliminated most import quotas. In addition, he reduced import tariffs on industrial raw materials by one-half and invited new foreign investment into the country. Although GDP growth had bounced back from a negative 2.8 percent in 1983 to a healthy 4.0 percent in 1984 and 3.8 percent in 1985, the sharp drop in petroleum export revenue in 1986 and the resulting increase in the fiscal deficit, 81 percent of which was financed through foreign borrowing, brought the nation to the brink of an economic crisis. In 1986 GDP growth fell to 1.7 percent, unemployment went up, and per capita income fell to its lowest level since 1978.

In March 1987, an earthquake destroyed about forty kilometers of the Trans-Ecuadorian Pipeline and its pumping stations, causing a nearly six-month suspension in crude petroleum production and the loss of an additional US$700 million in export revenue. Meanwhile, revenue from other exports—cocoa, coffee, and shrimp—did not increase and failed to compensate for the decline in oil income. The Ecuadorian government acquired a World Bank loan of US$80 million to help finance the reconstruction of the damaged pipeline, but repairs cost the government a total of US$150 million. GDP fell to -5.2 percent in 1987, inflation inched up to 32.5 percent, and the trade deficit stood at US$33 million. The government responded to its financial emergency by raising domestic gasoline prices by 80 percent and bus and taxi fares by 14 percent. To help make up for the oil revenue shortfall, a consortium of international banks loaned Ecuador an additional US$220 million, bringing public-sector external debt at the end of 1987 to about US$9.6 billion, one of the world's highest on a per-capita basis. (Ecuador's GDP for 1987 was US$10.6 billion.)

During Febres Cordero's last two years in office, his economic team concentrated on implementing monetary reforms, renegotiating the external debt, and encouraging foreign investment. Its efforts were only partially successful. The government failed to hold wages down, and, despite efforts to curtail government spending, public-sector expenditures increased dramatically in 1987 and in the first half of 1988. Ecuador's halting experiment with neoliberal economic measures unofficially came to a close on March 3, 1988, when Febres Cordero announced the end of the free-market foreign-exchange system. Two months later, on May 8, 1988, Febres Cordero's longtime rival, Rodrigo Borja of the center-left Democratic Left (Izquierda Democrática, ID) was elected president with 46 percent of the vote.

In contrast to Febres Cordero, Borja advocated an expanded state role in the national economy. During the campaign, he promised to promote industrialization and nontraditional exports and stressed the importance of agrarian reform. Borja, however, inherited a rapidly worsening economy as he assumed office on August 10, 1988; within a month he announced a national economic austerity program that included a sharp devaluation of the sucre, tax increases, new import restrictions, a reduction in public-sector spending, a 100-percent increase in fuel prices, and a 40-percent boost in electricity rates for private households. Borja also opened new negotiations with foreign creditors to whom Ecuador was in arrears for almost US$1 billion. The president, however, refused to lift the suspension of foreign debt payments, imposed by Febres Cordero in 1988, until April 1989.

Borja's austerity policies and the resulting climb in the unemployment rate to 13 percent by the end of 1988, the highest in ten years, spawned strikes by labor unions, public employees, and students. The government, however, continued its anti-inflationary program. Despite government cost-cutting efforts, inflation reached 86 percent in 1988, the highest in the country's history. On the positive side of the economic ledger, GDP expanded by 8 percent in 1988, as petroleum exports returned to pre-earthquake levels.

In an attempt to blunt criticism of his policies, Borja introduced a new package of economic liberalization measures in 1989, including a relaxation of import restrictions, a further devaluation of the official exchange rate to prod exports, and a loosening of banking controls to stimulate the manufacturing sector. About 62 percent of the import items that had been barred since mid-1988 were to be allowed into the country beginning in 1990.

== 1990–present ==
In 1992, Sixto Durán Ballén won his third run for the presidency. His tough macroeconomic adjustment measures were unpopular, but he succeeded in pushing a limited number of modernization initiatives through Congress. In 1996, Abdalá Bucaram, from the populist Ecuadorian Roldosista Party, won the presidency on a platform that promised populist economic and social reforms, but Congress unseated Bucaram in February 1997 on grounds of mental incompetence.

Deteriorating economic performance in 1997-98 culminated in a severe financial crisis in 1999. The crisis was precipitated by a number of external shocks, including the El Niño weather phenomenon in 1997, a sharp drop in global oil prices in 1997–98, and international emerging market instability in 1997–98. These factors highlighted the Government of Ecuador's unsustainable economic policy mix of large fiscal deficits and expansionary money policy and resulted in a 7.3% contraction of GDP, annual year-on-year inflation of 52.2%, and a 65% devaluation of the national currency in 1999.

On January 9, 2000, the administration of President Jamil Mahuad announced its intention to adopt the U.S. dollar as the official currency of Ecuador to address the ongoing economic crisis. Subsequent protest led to the 2000 Ecuadorean coup d'état which saw Mahuad's removal from office and the elevation of Vice President Gustavo Noboa to the presidency.

US Dollar has been the only official currency of Ecuador since the year 2000.

The Noboa government confirmed its commitment to convert to the dollar as the centerpiece of its economic recovery strategy, successfully completing the transition from sucres to dollars in 2001. Following the completion of a one-year stand-by program with the International Monetary Fund (IMF) in December 2001, Ecuador successfully negotiated a new $205 million stand-by agreement with the IMF in March 2003.

Buoyed by higher oil prices, the Ecuadorian economy experienced a modest recovery in 2000–01, with GDP rising 2.3% in 2000 and 5.4% in 2001. GDP growth leveled off to 3.3% in 2002. Inflation fell from an annual rate of 96.1% in 2000 to an annual rate of 22.4% in 2001.

== Data ==
The following table shows the main economic indicators in 1980–2017. Inflation below 5% is in green.

Year	GDP (in Bil. US$ PPP)	GDP per capita (in US$ PPP)	GDP growth (real)	Inflation rate (in Percent)	Unemployment (in Percent)	Government debt (in % of GDP)
1980	26.1	3,246	▲4.9 %	▲13.0 %	n/a	n/a
1981	▲29.6	▲3,584	▲3.9 %	▲16.4 %	n/a	n/a
1982	▲31.8	▲3,746	▲1.2 %	▲16.3 %	n/a	n/a
1983	▼32.1	▼3,681	▼−2.8 %	▲48.4 %	n/a	n/a
1984	▲34.6	▲3,867	▲4.2 %	▲31.2 %	n/a	n/a
1985	▲37.3	▲4,058	▲4.4 %	▲28.0 %	n/a	n/a
1986	▲39.3	▲4,160	▲3.1 %	▲23.0 %	n/a	n/a
1987	▼37.9	▼3,911	▼−6.0 %	▲29.5 %	n/a	n/a
1988	▲43.3	▲4,359	▲10,5	▲58.2 %	7.0 %	n/a
1989	▲45.1	▲4,432	▲0.3 %	▲76.6 %	▲7.9 %	n/a
1990	▲48.2	▲4,625	▲3.0 %	▲48.5 %	▼6.1 %	n/a
1991	▲52.4	▲4,910	▲5.1 %	▲48.8 %	▲8.5 %	n/a
1992	▲55.5	▲5,088	▲3.6 %	▲54.3 %	▲8.9 %	n/a
1993	▲58.0	▲5,200	▲2.0 %	▲45.0 %	▼8.3 %	n/a
1994	▲61.7	▲5,425	▲4.3 %	▲27.4 %	▼5.7 %	n/a
1995	▲64.4	▲5,556	▲2.3 %	▲22.9 %	▼5.4 %	n/a
1996	▲66.8	▲5,658	▲1.7 %	▲24.4 %	▲9.0 %	n/a
1997	▲70.8	▲5,910	▲4.3 %	▲30.6 %	▼7.8 %	n/a
1998	▲73.9	▲6,077	▲3.3 %	▲36.1 %	▲10.2 %	n/a
1999	▼71.5	▼5,792	▼−4.7 %	▲52.2 %	▲13.1 %	n/a
2000	▲73.9	▲5,901	▲1.1 %	▲96.1 %	▼7.6 %	n/a
2001	▲78.7	▲6,139	▲4.0 %	▲37.7 %	▲9.6 %	63.4 %
2002	▲83.1	▲6,350	▲4.1 %	▲12.5 %	▼7.8 %	▼55.5 %
2003	▲87.1	▲6,540	▲2.7 %	▲7.9 %	▲10.2 %	▼49.0 %
2004	▲96.9	▲7,148	▲8.2 %	▲2.7 %	▼7.2 %	▼43.0 %
2005	▲105.3	▲7,672	▲5.3 %	▲2.2 %	▼7.1 %	▼38.7 %
2006	▲113.3	▲8,112	▲4.4 %	▲3.3 %	▼6.7 %	▼38.1 %
2007	▲118.8	▲8,361	▲2.2 %	▲2.3 %	▲6.9 %	▼35.3 %
2008	▲128.9	▲8,905	▲6.4 %	▲8.4 %	▼6.0 %	▼28.7 %
2009	▲130.6	▲8,860	▲0.6 %	▲5.2 %	▲6.5 %	▼25.3 %
2010	▲136.8	▲9,116	▲3.5 %	▲3.6 %	▼5.0 %	▼23.1 %
2011	▲150.7	▲9,869	▲7.9 %	▲4.5 %	▼4.2 %	▼21.4 %
2012	▲162.1	▲10,444	▲5.6 %	▲5.1 %	▼4.1 %	▼20.6 %
2013	▲172.9	▲10,958	▲4.9 %	▲2.7 %	▲4.2 %	▲21.1 %
2014	▲182.6	▲11,394	▲3.8 %	▲3.6 %	▼3.8 %	▲27.1 %
2015	▲184.7	▼11,351	▲0.1 %	▲4.0 %	▲4.8 %	▲33.8 %
2016	▼184.2	▼11,144	▼−1.6 %	▲1.7 %	▲5.2 %	▲42.9 %
2017	▲192.6	▲11,482	▲2.7 %	▲0.4 %	▼4.6 %	▲45.0 %
