= Antonio Vargas =

Ecuadorian politician and Indigenous leader (1958–2025)

- Born: 1 December 1958; Unión Base, Puyo, Ecuador
- Died: 29 June 2025 (aged 66)
- Occupation: Politician

Carlos Antonio Vargas Guatatuca (1 December 1958 – 29 June 2025) was an Ecuadorian politician and indigenous Quechua leader. He was leader of the Confederación de Nacionalidades Indígenas de Ecuador (CONAIE) and Minister for Social Welfare under president Lucio Gutiérrez from 2003 to 2005.

Vargas was involved in the 2000 Ecuadorian coup d'état.

== Life and career ==
Vargas' mother, Eliseo, was a naturopath who spoke one of the Zaparoan languages, while his father, Acevedo, was a Kichwa-speaking merchant specializing in iron housewares. Oil was discovered in neighboring Napo Province when Vargas was eight, after which he attended school in Puyo and studied to be a primary school teacher. He later studied the Basque nationalist and Catalan nationalist movements. Cultural discrimination against indigenous people during this period motivated him to become an activist for social justice, land reform, and indigenous language preservation. Vargas was then elected chairman of the Pastaza Indigenous Peoples' Organization (Spanish: Organización de Pueblos Indígenas de Pastaza), with which he led protests against environmental destruction by oil companies, and served in the position until 1994. In 1997, Vargas was elected president of CONAIE. In January 2000, Vargas was one of the lead participants in the coup d'état that took place against President Jamil Mahuad as a result of the 1998–1999 economic crisis. In 2002, Vargas ran for the presidency of Ecuador under the banner of the Movimiento Independiente Amauta Jatari, finishing in last place. From 2003 to 2005, he served as Minister of Social Welfare under President Lucio Gutiérrez, despite the opposition of CONAIE, after which he was expelled from the organization.

On 20 June 2021, Vargas was arrested and sentenced to three years and four months detention in the Morona Santiago Social Rehabilitation Center, as well as a fine of twelve times the minimum wage, for illegal use/occupation and trafficking of land. He was pardoned by president Guillermo Lasso on 8 November of that year for good behavior. On 29 June 2025, Vargas died at the age of 66.
