= Pedro Aguayo =

Ecuadorian politician (1939–2025)

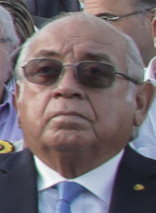
Pedro Aguayo Cubillo

Pedro Aguayo Cubillo (15 July 1939 – 5 July 2025) was an Ecuadorian politician, who served as Vice President from 2 April 1998 to 10 August 1998, the last four months of the presidency of Fabián Alarcón.

== Political career ==
Before his election, Aguayo was the Ecuadorian representative in the Inter-American Development Bank (IDB).

=== Vice Presidency (1998) ===
Aguayo was nominated by Alarcón and selected by the National Congress to replace Rosalía Arteaga upon her resignation in late March 1998. Aguayo was sworn in by the then-president of Congress, Heinz Moeller.

His four-month tenure was described as a "total turn" and a departure in relations between the heads of the executive branch after the tense first year between Alarcón and Arteaga. From 20 April, the activities of Aguayo's office became intense as, per an executive decree, he received four functions: coordinate the economic front, execute reconstruction and rehabilitation tasks after that year's El Niño phenomenon, head the committee to construct new airports and the new Terrestrial (Bus) Terminal of Guayaquil.

The new VP gained support among various political, social, and business sectors that even came to call for the increasingly unpopular Alarcón to resign so that Aguayo could assume the Presidency.

One indication of the change in relations between the President and Vice President was that Alarcón made eight trips abroad; in five of them, he did not entrust power to Arteaga. Aguayo, however, took charge of the Presidency on three occasions.

Aguayo reportedly cared for the rehabilitation of the provinces affected by El Niño and achieved the auspices of the United Nations to carry out a study on the phenomenon's impact, meant for the newly elected authorities to continue total reconstruction. Finally, he was involved in the preparation of a transition team that also contacted the newly-elected government of Jamil Mahuad and his running mate, Gustavo Noboa, to inform them about ongoing and pending plans.

== Personal life and death ==
Aguayo was born on 15 July 1939. He died on 5 July 2025, at the age of 85.

Political offices
Preceded by Rosalía Arteaga Serrano	Vice President of Ecuador; 1998	Succeeded by Gustavo Noboa Bejarano
