= 2021 United Nations Secretary-General selection =

Reappointment of António Guterres

- SC: 8 June 2021; GA: 18 June 2021
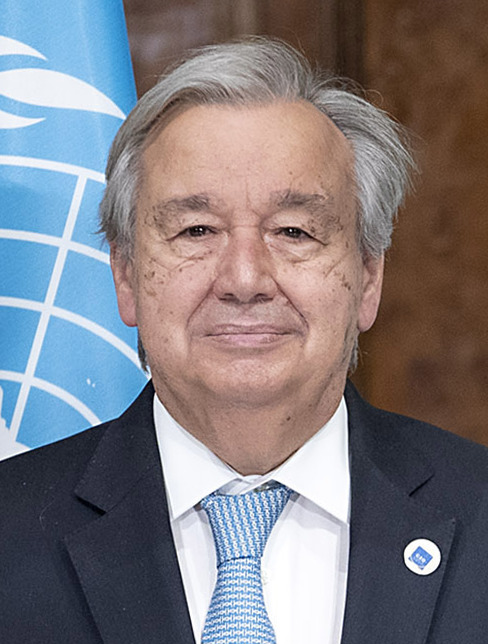
Nominee	António Guterres
Country	Portugal
Result	Acclaimed
Secretary General before election
António Guterres
Elected Secretary General
António Guterres

A United Nations Secretary-General selection was held in June 2021 to choose the Secretary-General of the United Nations. Incumbent António Guterres was the only official candidate for the position. On 8 June 2021, Guterres was unanimously recommended by the United Nations Security Council (SC) for a second term at the helm of the organisation. His re-election was ratified by the United Nations General Assembly (GA) by acclamation on 18 June 2021, without a vote. Guterres commenced his second five-year term on 1 January 2022.

== Background ==
Article 97 of the United Nations Charter provides that "the Secretary-General shall be appointed by the General Assembly upon the recommendation of the Security Council". As a result, the selection is subject to the veto of any of the five permanent members of the Security Council. The Charter's minimal language has since been supplemented by other procedural rules and accepted practices.

Although different regions have held the office, no secretary from Eastern Europe has ever been selected Secretary-General. No woman has ever been selected either. In 2016 there were various international campaigns to select an eastern European or a woman. Despite this, the selection was won by the only candidate who was neither female nor from Eastern Europe. In 2021, some groups attempted to revive the campaign to elect a woman at the helm of the United Nations, but no female candidate was nominated by a member state to be considered by the Security Council.

== Candidates ==
In order to be eligible for selection, a candidate must be nominated by at least one member state. On 8 June, the day the Security Council convened to recommend a candidate to the General Assembly, there was only one official candidate in the selection process (incumbent António Guterres), and seven additional self-declared applicant candidates.

=== Official candidate ===
The incumbent Secretary General António Guterres confirmed he would be seeking a second five-year term.

Official candidate
Image	Name	Prior experience	Nominator	Nominated	Regional group
	António Guterres	Prime Minister of Portugal (1995–2002); United Nations High Commissioner for Refugees (2005–2015); Secretary-General of the United Nations (2017–)	Portugal	26 February 2021	Western European and Others Group (WEOG)

=== Other notable declared candidate ===
- Rosalía Arteaga, President of Ecuador from 9 to 11 February 1997. This candidate was proposed by the Forward campaign, an initiative promoted by Colombe Cahen-Salvador and Andrea Venzon of the Atlas Movement.

== Campaign ==
By May 2021, incumbent António Guterres had already secured the support of all five permanent members of the United Nations Security Council, the European Union and of the Non-Aligned Movement, leading some observers to believe that his re-election was almost a certainty.

== Endorsements ==
Rosalía Arteaga

Private citizens

- Paula María Bertol, former member of the Argentine Chamber of Deputies
António Guterres

Nations

- China
- France
- Germany
- India
- Pakistan
- Portugal
- Russia
- United Kingdom
- United States

Organisations

- European Union
- Non-Aligned Movement

== Results ==
On 8 June 2021, the Security Council unanimously adopted resolution 2580 recommending António Guterres for a second term at the helm of the United Nations. His re-election was ratified by the United Nations General Assembly by acclamation on 18 June 2021, without a vote.
