= Group of Popular Combatants =

Ecuadorian far-left insurgent movement

- Grupos de Combatientes Populares
- Dates active: 1994–present
- Country: Ecuador
- Allegiance: PCMLE
- Ideology: Communism; Marxism–Leninism; Stalinism; Hoxhaism; Anti-revisionism
- Political position: Far-left
- Wars: Insurgency in Ecuador

The Group of Popular Combatants (Spanish: Grupos de Combatientes Populares, GCP) is a far-left Marxist–Leninist insurgent movement active in the Republic of Ecuador. It is the armed wing of the Marxist–Leninist Communist Party of Ecuador (Spanish: Partido Comunista Marxista–Leninista del Ecuador, PCMLE), a party formed in 1964 as a split from the Communist Party of Ecuador and internationally affiliated with the International Conference of Marxist–Leninist Parties and Organizations (Unity & Struggle). The party belongs to an anti-revisionist tradition of Marxism–Leninism, one originally aligned with Albania during the Cold War and frequently referred to as Hoxhaism.

== History ==
The Group of Popular Combatants is the militant and armed sector of the Marxist–Leninist Communist Party of Ecuador. The goal of the Marxist–Leninist Communist Party of Ecuador is to create a revolution in Ecuador that will lead to socialism and communism. The Marxist–Leninist Communist Party of Ecuador gets its political inspiration from other countries' communist parties. These communist parties share similar Marxist–Leninist ideologies, so they meet to share each country's political successes.

== Militia ==
The armed wing was originally formed in 1994, during the presidency of Sixto Durán Ballén. It became far more active in 2000, and has since engaged in a number of attacks on foreign diplomats, as well as several bombings. These bombings have utilized so-called airborne leaflet propaganda, a tactic relatively popular among Latin American revolutionaries. For example, in 2001 the GCP was blamed by authorities for a pamphlet bomb and later the same year the group claimed responsibility for detonating a pamphlet bomb in downtown Quito that let out hundreds of pamphlets protesting against Plan Colombia.

In 2002 it was reported that the Group of Popular Combatants was attempting to establish a rural base in a remote jungle region bordering Colombia, and that they may have been receiving training from some of the guerrilla groups involved in the ongoing Colombian conflict.

== Claimed attacks ==
The Group of Popular Combatants have three attacks where they claimed responsibility in Ecuador. The Group of Popular Combatants committed their first attack on September 28, 1997 in Quito, Pichincha, Ecuador. No one was injured or killed in the attack.

Their second attack occurred on February 16, 2000 in Guayaquil city, Guayas, Ecuador. A television network received a video tape which contained a concealed bomb. Rafael Cuesta, the news editor at the station, and the only casualty in the attack, was wounded when the bomb went off inside the station. Prior to the attack, the news station had warnings about a possible attack from a different group, This initially led authorities to blame a different organization, although, the Group of Popular Combatants did eventually take responsibility. Rafael Cuesta was the only person injured and no one was killed.

On February 21, 2000 the Group of Popular Combatants committed their third terrorist attack. It took place in Guayaquil, Guayas, Ecuador. Their target was indigenous rights leader, Marcos Murillo. In this attack too, a videocassette sent to the location of Marcos contained a concealed bomb. The police were called and the bomb was defused. There was no one killed or injured in this attack.

On November 22, 2010, the Group of Popular Combatants claimed responsibility for a bomb placed in the head office of the University of Guayaquil. The group had not been active for almost a decade when this occurred. The Group of Popular Combatants claimed they used the bomb to attempt to influence student elections held at the University.

== Weaponry ==
Two of the incident reports from the Global Terrorism Database show that the Group of Popular Combatants placed bombs inside video cassettes and sent them to specific designated places to target people or make a political statement. The fourth attack is not included on the Global Terrorism Database because there is some speculation about whether they actually did it. However, this attack did use a bomb as well, which is consistent to the weaponry used in their previous attacks.

== See also ==
- Terrorism in Ecuador
- Popular Liberation Army
- Shining Path
- Insurgency in Ecuador
