= Workers' Party of Ecuador =

Communist party in Ecuador

Workers' Party of Ecuador Partido de los Trabajadores del Ecuador
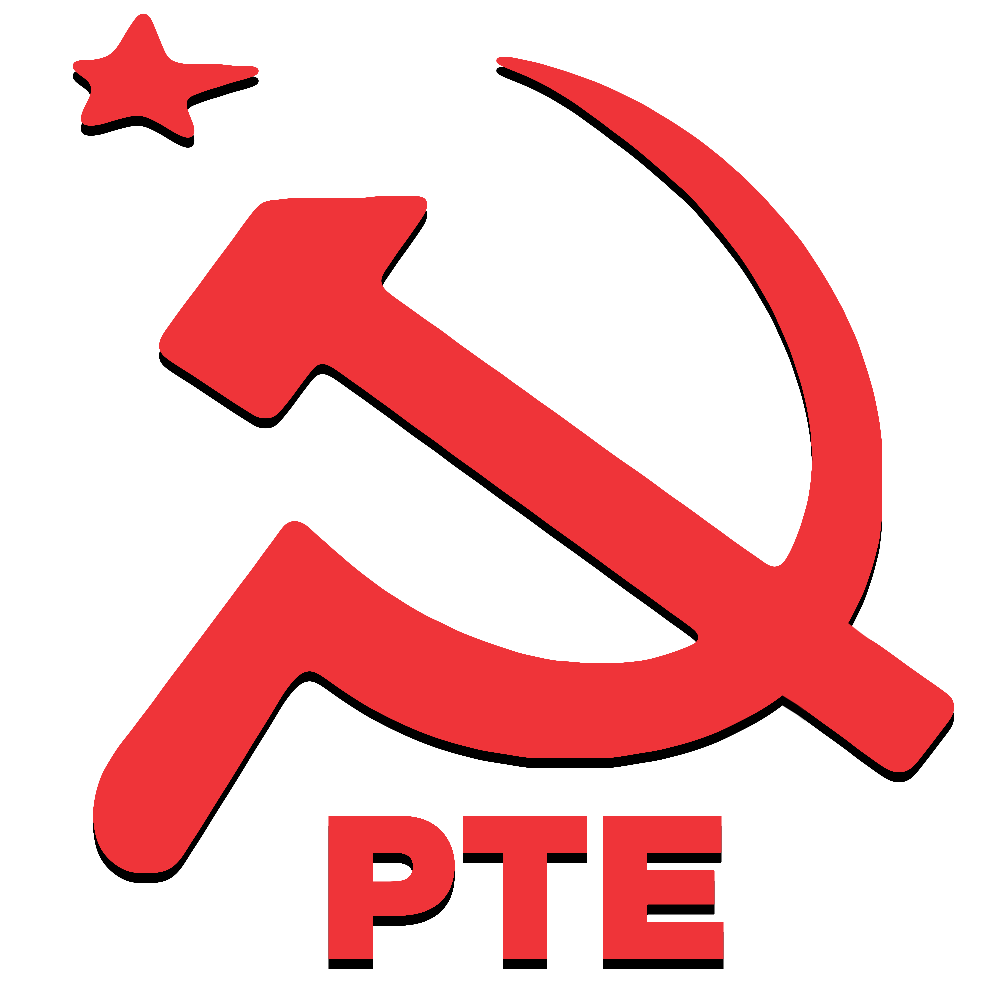
- Abbreviation: PTE
- Founded: 1996
- Split from: Marxist–Leninist Communist Party of Ecuador
- Headquarters: Quito
- Newspaper: Amanecer Insurgente
- Ideology: Communism; Marxism–Leninism; Hoxhaism; Anti-revisionism
- Political position: Far-left
- Slogan: Proletarians of all countries, unite!

Workers' Party of Ecuador (in Spanish: Partido de los Trabajadores del Ecuador) is a Marxist-Leninist and Hoxhaist party in Ecuador. PTE was formed in 1996 as a split from the Marxist–Leninist Communist Party of Ecuador. PTE publishes Amanecer Insurgente.

The Workers' Party of Ecuador (WPE) is a political party that focuses on representing the working class and advocating for the rights of marginalized groups in Ecuador. It emphasizes opposition to exploitation, corruption, and capitalist globalization, and promotes democratic values, human rights, and environmental protection. The WPE adheres to Marxist–Leninist principles and aims to establish popular power in Ecuador through political and ideological education, as well as the organization of local power structures. The party's long-term goal is to lead a revolution that will overthrow bourgeois and imperialist dominance, paving the way for a government that initiates democratic and anti-imperialist reforms towards a socialist society. The WPE integrates scientific socialism with Ecuador's labor and popular movements, aiming to influence the country's socio-political landscape through both ideological and practical engagement.

== See also ==
- List of anti-revisionist groups
