= Communist Party of Ecuador – Red Sun =

Maoist guerilla group in Ecuador

Communist Party of Ecuador – Red Sun Partido Comunista de Ecuador – Sol Rojo
- Abbreviation: PCE-SR
- Founded: 1 June 1993
- Ideology: Communism; Marxism–Leninism–Maoism; Gonzalo Thought; Anti-revisionism; Revolutionary socialism
- Political position: Far-left
- International affiliation: ICL

Party flag

Website
- Puka Inti

Alternative flag of the PCE-SR

The Communist Party of Ecuador – Red Sun (Spanish: Partido Comunista de Ecuador - Sol Rojo, PCE-SR), also known as Puka Inti (Quechua for "Red Sun") is a Marxist–Leninist–Maoist group in Ecuador. It was founded on 1 June 1993 and carried out several minor bombings in that year. In 1994 the US State Department estimated that the group had less than 100 members. From inception, until their death, the group's former leader used the nom de guerre "Comrade Joselo". Joselo died on November 6, 2022 with no announcement of a successor. The PCE-SR consists mostly of former members of the underground leftist group ¡Alfaro Vive, Carajo! The organization follows the ideas of the Peruvian communist leader Abimael Guzmán, founder and longtime chairman of the Shining Path in Peru. The organization has also become close to the Mantaro Red Base Committee, the Communist Party of India (Maoist), and is also a member of the International Communist League (Maoist).

== History ==
PCE-SR was founded in 1993 by Comrade Joselo and initially drew a large membership from the defunct guerrilla organization ¡Alfaro Vive, Carajo!. The ideological basis for the PCE-SR originates from the Peruvian Shining Path with the aspiration of implementing the contributions of Gonzalo Thought to the conditions of Ecuador.

In 2007, a documentary titled Alfaro Vive Carajo: Del Sueño al Caos (From Dream to Chaos) was released which gave testimonies by former AVC members. In response, PCE-SR criticized Santiago Kingman for allegedly distorting the guerrilla struggle and capitulating to the government.

Puka Inti has been accused of being a direct puppet of Shining Path, though it asserts that it is only a supporter of Gonzalo Thought and of the broader international Maoist movement.

== See also ==
- Insurgency in Ecuador
- List of anti-revisionist groups
