= Marxist–Leninist Communist Party of Ecuador =

Marxist–Leninist Communist Party of Ecuador Partido Comunista Marxista–Leninista del Ecuador
- Abbreviation: PCMLE
- Spokesperson: Oswaldo Palacios
- Founded: August 1, 1964
- Split from: PCE
- Headquarters: Quito
- Newspaper: En Marcha
- Youth wing: Revolutionary Youth of Ecuador
- Armed Wing: GCP
- Ideology: Communism; Marxism–Leninism; Stalinism; Hoxhaism; Anti-revisionism
- Political position: Far-left
- National affiliation: MPD (1978–2014); UP (since 2014)
- Regional affiliation: São Paulo Forum
- International affiliation: ICMLPO
- Colours: Red
- Slogan: For People's Power and Socialism!

Party flag

Website
- www.pcmle.org

A 2007 issue of En Marcha. The header contains the heads of Karl Marx, Friedrich Engels, Vladimir Lenin and Joseph Stalin. Next to them is the slogan "Workers of the world, unite!", written in Spanish.

A 2008 issue of En Marcha. In the top right corner, a photo of Enver Hoxha shows the party's ideological orientation. This issue's main article is about May 1968.

The Marxist–Leninist Communist Party of Ecuador (Spanish: Partido Comunista Marxista-Leninista del Ecuador) is an anti-revisionist Marxist–Leninist communist party in Ecuador, founded August 1, 1964, following a split from the Communist Party of Ecuador.

PCMLE publishes En Marcha, and is an active participant in the International Conference of Marxist–Leninist Parties and Organizations (Unity & Struggle).

In 1978, PCMLE founded the electoral wing Democratic People's Movement (MPD) before it was dissolved and replaced with Popular Unity (UP) in 2014.

The Workers' Party of Ecuador split from the PCMLE in 1996.

== Ideology ==
The party adheres to anti-revisionist Marxism–Leninism and strongly supports the ideology of Karl Marx, Friedrich Engels, Vladimir Lenin, Joseph Stalin, Enver Hoxha and Che Guevara.

== Armed wing ==
The Group of Popular Combatants (GCP) was founded in 1994 as the armed wing of the party during the presidency of Sixto Durán Ballén. The GCP committed three mail bombing attacks between 1997-2000, but has been inactive since. On March 3rd, 2012, 10 alleged members of the GCP were arrested and charged with subversion and terrorism. The case itself, which became known as the Luluncoto 10, would become controversial over the process of criminalizing political groups as terrorist organizations.

== See also ==
- Insurgency in Ecuador
- List of anti-revisionist groups
