= 2000 Ecuadorian coup d'état =

Coup in Ecuador

Date	21 to 22 January 2000
Location	Ecuador
Result	Coup successful: Jamil Mahuad is deposed and goes into exile.; National Salvation Junta declared on 21 January; Military forces dissolution of National Salvation Junta on 22 January; Vice President Gustavo Noboa installed as president; Military officers participating in the National Salvation Junta arrested, later granted amnesty

Belligerents
Government of Ecuador	Confederation of Indigenous Nationalities of Ecuador; Military officers	Armed Forces of Ecuador

Commanders and leaders
(Ecuador) Jamil Mahuad	Antonio Vargas; Lucio Gutiérrez (Ecuador) Carlos Solórzano	Carlos Mendoza; Telmo Sandoval

The 2000 Ecuadorian coup d'état took place on 21 January 2000 and resulted in President Jamil Mahuad being deposed, and replaced by Vice President Gustavo Noboa. The coup coalition brought together a short-lived junta composed by the country's most powerful indigenous group, Confederation of Indigenous Nationalities of Ecuador (CONAIE), and a group of junior military officers led by Lieutenant Colonel Lucio Gutiérrez.

Amidst a severe economic crisis, the coup coalition sought to emulate the populist democracy and economy of Hugo Chávez's Venezuela. The coup ultimately failed, with senior military officers opposed to the programme installing the elected Vice President as President, and imprisoning coup leaders.

== Background ==
There was a severe economic crisis in Ecuador (including the 1998–99 Ecuador economic crisis), which had led to a 60% cut in the armed forces budget. There were also concerns about corruption. Mahuad's popularity rating had fallen from 60% in October 1998 to 6% in January 2000. In the early days of 2000, Mahuad announced the dollarization of the economy of Ecuador, along with a number of International Monetary Fund measures.

== Coup ==
In response to the economic plans "Indigenous crowds flocked to Quito demanding Mahuad's dismissal and occupying Congress and the Supreme Court." On 21 January 2000 Lucio Gutiérrez and CONAIE President Antonio Vargas declared a "government of national salvation". This led to "frantic consultations among generals, politicians, and US diplomats", and ultimately saw senior military officers install Vice President Gustavo Noboa as president and arrest the coup leaders.

During the coup, there was little mobilisation against it, and a survey showed widespread popular support for CONAIE's occupation of Congress, which had allowed the military to call for Mahuad's resignation. However, there was little public support for military rule, a fact senior military officers conducting the negotiations during the coup were aware of. The military's senior officers opposed the coalition's plans, and had close ties with the country political and economic elite, who also opposed them (such as influential former president and then-Mayor of Guayaquil León Febres Cordero). They were also influenced by threats of US economic sanctions.

In addition, the role of junior officers in the coup was seen as a subversion of the military hierarchy, and Chief of the Military High Command, General Carlos Mendoza, said that the generals could not accept Lieutenant Colonel Lucio Gutiérrez as a ruling junta's military representative. There were negotiations about replacing Gutiérrez with Mendoza, but shortly after the junta accepted this, "Mendoza hijacked the coup and put an end to it by handing power over to the vice president of the country."

== Aftermath ==
Gutiérrez was imprisoned for four months, and then expelled from the army. He ran for president in the 2002 general elections and was elected, taking office in January 2003, but his support collapsed and he was himself ousted after a popular revolt in April 2005, which saw the third and final overthrow (to date) of a democratically elected government in Ecuador.

This recently turbulent period of Ecuadorian history ended with the 2006 election of Rafael Correa, an academic outsider who opposed and condemned the practices of traditional parties, political and economical elites, while moving a leftist, anti-neoliberal and populist agenda which since 2007 has seen an increase in public spending, a new Constitution, social programs and an anti-imperialist foreign policy aligned with the socialism of the 21st century, despite accusations of curtailing freedoms, particularly speech and press.
