= Pedro Pinto Rubianes =

Vice President of Ecuador (1931–2022)

Pedro Alfredo Pinto Rubianes (31 January 1931 – 18 April 2022) served as Vice President of Ecuador from 27 January 2000 to 15 January 2003, during the presidency of Gustavo Noboa. He was elected by National Congress to fill vacancy of vice presidency as Noboa became president.

Pinto obtained an industrial engineer degree in Germany and studied economics in Ecuador.

In politics prior to vice presidency, Pinto was a provincial deputy for Pichincha and served as Minister of Finance in the government of Osvaldo Hurtado from 1982 to 1984.

Political offices
| Preceded by Gustavo Noboa Bejarano | Vice President of Ecuador; 2000–2003 | Succeeded by Luis Alfredo Palacio González |
