= 1998–1999 Ecuador economic crisis =

Period of economic instability

The 1998–99 Ecuador economic crisis was a period of economic instability that resulted from a combined inflationary-currency crisis, financial crisis, fiscal crisis, and sovereign debt crisis. Severe inflation and devaluation of the sucre led to President Jamil Mahuad announcing on January 9, 2000, that the U.S. dollar would be adopted as the national currency. Poor economic conditions and subsequent protests against the government resulted in the 2000 Ecuadorian coup d’état in which Jamil Mahuad was forced to resign and was replaced by his vice president, Gustavo Noboa.

== Background ==
Throughout the 20th century, Ecuador was one of the poorer countries in Latin America and it had high rates of poverty and income inequality compared to other countries in the region. By the late 1990s, around 45% of the population lived below the national poverty line, making them especially vulnerable. The discovery of oil in the 1960s led to rapid economic growth but created an economy that was dependent on exports of oil and agricultural products such as bananas, coffee, and shrimp. Lower oil prices resulted in economic stagnation throughout the 1980s and into the 1990s, as oil exports alone accounted for half of the country's total exports and about a third of all government revenue in the late 1990s. Ecuador's population and economy can be geographically divided into four general regions: the Pacific coastal region in the west, the central Andean highlands, the eastern Amazonian regions, and the Insular region comprising the Galápagos Islands. 95% of the population lives on the coast or in the central highlands, and this accounts for the majority of Ecuador's economic activity. The Amazonian regions are mostly populated by indigenous people who are generally poorer, despite the fact that the Amazon contains Ecuador's significant oil reserves. Across all four regions, poverty is much worse in rural areas than in urban areas. Ecuador's social and economic inequalities have contributed to internal tensions and political divides on a national level, which became evident during the government's response to the financial crisis.

== Causes ==
In 2010, author and professor Alberto Valencia Granada published a book called When Success is a Crime: Filanbanco: A Case of Violation of Human Rights in Ecuador. His book summarizes the causes of the financial crisis:

In the late 1990s, Ecuador (and the entire region) experienced capital flight following the East Asian and Russian crises. Ecuador then experienced a political-economic crisis that was aggravated by many factors: military confrontation with Peru, lack of sufficient hydroelectric energy production (due to low water levels), and difficulties in the agricultural sector because of the El Niño weather phenomenon. These factors together deepened the political crisis in the country — a time period that saw four presidents within eight years. The biggest victims of the economic crisis were the agricultural export industry located along the coasts, which were Filanbanco’s principal credit recipients. Lack of payments from these customers, combined with restrictions on opening new lines of international credit, squeezed the bank. Thus, the bank turned to other companies within the Isaias Group for cash along with liquidity loans from the Central Bank.

=== Structural weaknesses in Ecuador ===
Ecuador's economic conditions facilitated the emergence of a fragile financial system, making it more susceptible to disruptions. The financial sector was also affected by the regional fragmentation between policy makers in the capital, Quito, and banks based in the port city of Guayaquil, the most populous and economic center of the country in 1999. Financial liberalization policies had been adopted in the early 1990s by conservative president Sixto Durán-Ballén and his vice president Alberto Dahik (widely considered the economic tsar of the government and mastermind of neoliberal policies), allowing easier access to international markets and investors, but they also created a largely deregulated domestic financial sector. Many Ecuadorian banks were well connected to prominent business groups and politicians, and financial supervision and regulation was not strongly enforced. As a result, Ecuadorian banks experienced a credit boom in the 1990s, providing high-risk loans to well-connected customers, assuming that the government and Central Bank would bail them out if needed. Lack of oversight also allowed many banks to engage in lucrative but risky offshore banking in U.S. dollar denominations, creating an informal dollarization of the financial sector, and a vulnerability to fluctuations in the exchange rate.

=== Shocks and vulnerability ===
Ecuador's public finances in the 1990s were heavily dependent on oil revenue, and public spending was high. A series of external shocks triggered the financial crisis in the short term. A strong El Niño in 1997–1998 brought heavy rains and flooding that ruined crops and damaged infrastructure, costing the country about 13% of its GDP. These shocks occurred soon after several financial crises in Asia (1997), Russia (1998), and Brazil (1998), which were damaging to the world economy. In this context, global financial institutions were more reluctant to offer credit lines to Ecuador and other developing countries. Oil prices plunged in 1998, partly in response to the global economic slowdown following the Asian financial crisis, which significantly reduced the government's revenues. These shocks created a situation where the public deficit grew uncontrollably, as the government had to recover from El Niño damage but had restricted access to oil revenues and international financing. For example, the public sector deficit increased from 2.6% of GDP in 1997 to 6.2% in 1998.

Ecuador was also undergoing a period of political vulnerability in the 1990s. The fragmentation and divided politics of the country resulted in a relatively weak state throughout the 1990s, which never gained widespread support. Populist president Abdalá Bucaram, known as "El Loco", was declared mentally unfit by Congress and fled after nation-wide protests in 1997, and an interim government under Fabián Alarcón was in power until Jamil Mahuad was elected in 1998, just as the banking crisis was developing.

== Crisis and government response ==
The economic crisis began in the context of increasing public debt and poor economic performance on a national level. In the private financial sector, banks had given out excessively risky loans but were struggling to maintain liquidity. The banking crisis started in April 1998 with the failure of a small bank, but the ensuing atmosphere of uncertainty caused excessive withdrawals and triggered more bank failures throughout 1998. By August, important bank failures had reached the point where the government could no longer intervene by bailing out and supporting struggling banks. By December, the newly established Deposit Guarantee Agency (Spanish: Agencia de Garantía de Depósitos, AGD) set up deposit insurance in an attempt to discourage further withdrawals. Another law starting in January 1999 established a 1% tax on any financial transactions, which would discourage withdrawals and raise revenue for the struggling government. However, this tax proved devastating for both the financial system and ordinary people, as it discouraged all financial activity and did not prevent deposit withdrawals. Other proposed government policies included increases in general sales taxes and gasoline taxes.

Early in 1999, the AGD took over and closed major banks that were failing, all the while providing a deposit guarantee. Increasing consumer prices and the depreciation of the Sucre raised fears of hyperinflation, and in March 1999 the government declared a national bank holiday, which ended up lasting a full week from March 8–12. At the end of the holiday, the government announced a partial deposit freeze in which dollar-denominated bank deposits were frozen for between six months to a year. This did temporarily slow inflation, but it caused the collapse of trust in the banking system and poor economic conditions. Throughout 1999, the government did gradually unfreeze deposits, but this was followed by widespread withdrawals and more bank failure, due to a lack of confidence in the banks. By September, the government itself had defaulted on external debts as it had spent significant resources supporting the central bank and its deposit guarantees.

== Economic effects ==
=== Dollarization ===
Even though the government tried to keep inflation down, the sucre lost value quickly at the end of 1999, which led to a lot of people using U.S. dollars unofficially. money in the banking system. As a last resort to prevent hyperinflation, the government formally adopted the U.S. dollar in January 2000. The stability of the new currency was a necessary first step towards economic recovery, but the exchange rate was fixed at 25,000:1, which resulted in great losses of wealth.

=== Poverty and living conditions ===
The severe effects of the financial crisis were especially visible in Ecuador because of the preexisting problems of poverty and national inequality. The general economic uncertainty resulted in loss of jobs and wealth, which had the most significant effect on people who were already vulnerable. The government was financially limited due to its debt defaults, and it had to focus on macroeconomic solutions rather than the social problems that developed during the financial crisis. Measures of poverty, including extreme poverty and the poverty gap, all increased during the crisis and peaked in 1999. Rural areas were especially affected, and metrics such as worse child nutrition, reduced educational spending, and poor health outcomes all showed that the financial crisis had severe effects. An estimated 200,000 Ecuadorians also left the country between 1998 and 2000, representing 2% of the labor force of the country.

== Political effects ==
President Jamil Mahuad suffered declining popularity ratings throughout the financial crisis, decreasing from 60% in 1998 to 6% in early 2000. The dollarization policy was particularly unpopular even if it was implemented successfully. Protests led by a coalition of indigenous peoples (CONAIE) and supported by the military occupied Congress and forced President Mahuad to resign.

== Social effects ==
=== Migration to the United States ===
The Ecuadorian financial crisis caused massive migrations, primarily to the United States and Spain. Between the years 1999 and 2000, approximately 400,000 Ecuadorians migrated to the United States. This was not the first wave of Ecuadorian migration to the U.S., and so this wave of migrants joined roughly half a million other Ecuadorians who had already paved the way for migration. Most Ecuadorians who migrated to the U.S. as a result of the Ecuadorian financial crisis were from the regions of Azuay and Cañar. The largest community of Ecuadorians in the U.S. resides in the New York metropolitan area. Half of the Ecuadorian diaspora is within the United States.

Ecuadorian migration to the US has become increasingly transnational in nature. This change in the currency is due in part to remittances sent back to communities in Ecuador by migrant communities in the US. The sending of these remittances facilitates a continuous connection between migrants and those at home, which in turn facilitates further migration. Remittances to Ecuador were at around $643 million in 1997 and increased to $1.41 billion in 2001, which highlights the sudden impact emigration had on Ecuador.

=== Migration to Spain ===
Many Ecuadorians migrated to Spain in search of financial opportunity, as Spain's economy had been flourishing. Around 7,000 Ecuadorians arrived in Spain each month in 2000. This early wave left Ecuador during the hardest part of the economic crisis and was composed of young people eager to work. By 2005, the Ecuadorian community in Spain was around 500,000 people. During the period until 2004, the migrants were mainly composed of family members joining those who had first migrated. The Ecuadorian diaspora in Spain differs from the U.S. This led to a situation where Ecuadorians experienced greater economic prosperity in Spain. They sent up to 46% of their salary, 16% invested in improving living conditions for their families back in Ecuador. A lot of whom were young kids reuniting with their parents; such kids grew up in Spain, attended school, and are now making up the second generation of Ecuadorians in Spain.
