= Ecuadorian sucre =

Currency of Ecuador from 1884 to 2000

sucre ecuatoriano (Spanish)
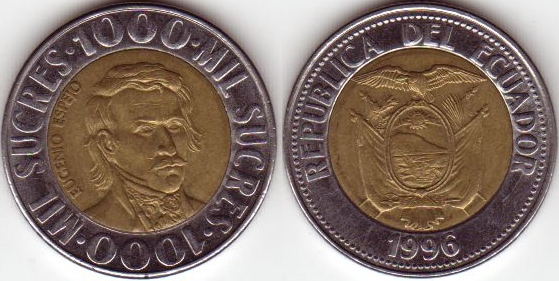
1000 sucres, 1996
The final series of Ecuadorian sucre banknotes used in the last years before dollarization.

ISO 4217
- Code: ECS

Unit
- Plural: sucres
- Symbol: S/.

Denominations
- Subunit
- 1/100: centavo
- Plural
- centavo: centavos
- Banknotes: 5000, 10,000, 20,000, 50,000 sucres
- Coins: 100, 500, 1000 sucres

Demographics
- Date of introduction: 1884
- Date of withdrawal: 2000
- User(s): Ecuador

Issuance
- Central bank: Banco Central del Ecuador
- Website: www.bce.fin.ec
- This infobox shows the latest status before this currency was rendered obsolete.

The sucre (Spanish pronunciation: [ˈsukre]) was the currency of Ecuador between 1884 and 2000. Its ISO code was ECS and it was subdivided into 10 decimos and 100 centavos. The sucre was named after Latin American political leader Antonio José de Sucre. The currency was replaced by the United States dollar as a result of the 1998–99 financial crisis.

== History ==
The Ecuadorian peso was renamed as the sucre on March 22, 1884, and was then linked to the silver standard. The sucre was tied to 22.5 g of fine silver (equivalent to 5 LMU francs). Outdated coins were taken out of circulation between 1887 and 1892, with only the silver-backed coins remaining in circulation.

The decline of the international price of silver during the 1890s prompted Ecuador to switch to the gold standard on 3 November 1898, with the sucre tied to 732.224 mg of fine gold (equivalent to 2 shillings sterling).

The sucre became inconvertible shortly after World War I began in 1914 due to international political tension. Despite extensive measures to support the sucre's value, the exchange rate rapidly continued to decline. The sucre's exchange rate was eventually stabilized during 1926, at which point Ecuador re-established the gold standard with the sucre equal to 300.933 mg fine gold or $0.20 USD (a devaluation of 58.8%).

Following the suspension of the gold standard on February 8, 1932, foreign exchange controls were adopted on April 30, which fixed the official buying rate at 5.95 per U.S. dollar. Once the price of silver rose above the nominal value of most silver coins during the 1930s, Ecuador banned its export on May 17, 1935. Following this event, the nation's foreign exchange system underwent several adjustments as the sucre's depreciation continued. The foreign exchange controls were finally lifted in September 1937, and the official rate was set at 13.5 sucre per U.S. dollar. On June 4, 1940, the sucre was finally devalued to 14.77 sucre per USD, and controls were put back in place. The official rate became 14 sucre per USD in 1942 and 13.5 per USD in 1944.

The International Monetary Fund (IMF) established the purchasing power parity of the sucre at 13.5 per USD on 18 December 1946. When the IMF adopted a system of multiple exchange rates in 1947, the sucre's IMF parity was devalued to 15 sucre per USD by 1950, 18 by 1961, and 25 per USD by 1970.

The sucre maintained a fairly stable exchange rate against the U.S. dollar until 1983, when it was devalued to 42 per USD and a crawling peg was adopted. Depreciation increased rapidly, and the Sucre's free market rate was over 800 per USD by 1990 and nearly 3000 by 1995. The sucre lost 67% of its foreign exchange value during 1999; its value nosedived an additional 17% over the course of one week, ending at 25,000 sucre per USD on 7 January 2000.

On 9 January, President Jamil Mahuad announced that the US dollar was to be adopted as Ecuador's official currency, although the US dollar had already had wide informal use in Ecuador before this decision was made. The US dollar became legal tender in Ecuador on 13 March 2000, as sucre notes ceased to be legal tender on 11 September 2000. Sucre notes were exchangeable at a rate of 25,000 sucre per dollar at the Banco Central until 30 March 2001.

== Coins ==
In 1884, the government introduced ⁣⁣cupronickel⁣⁣ one-and-a-half centavo coins, along with silver half decimo coins, one and two decimo coins, and sucre and half sucre coins. Centavo coins minted as denominations of the peso continued to circulate after the introduction of the sucre. Copper replaced cupronickel as the material used for the one-and-a-half-centavo in 1890, while silver half-decimo coins were introduced in 1893. The 10 centavo coin was called a real, with the 5 centavo coin known as a medio (meaning half). Gold 10-sucre coins were issued in 1899 and 1900.

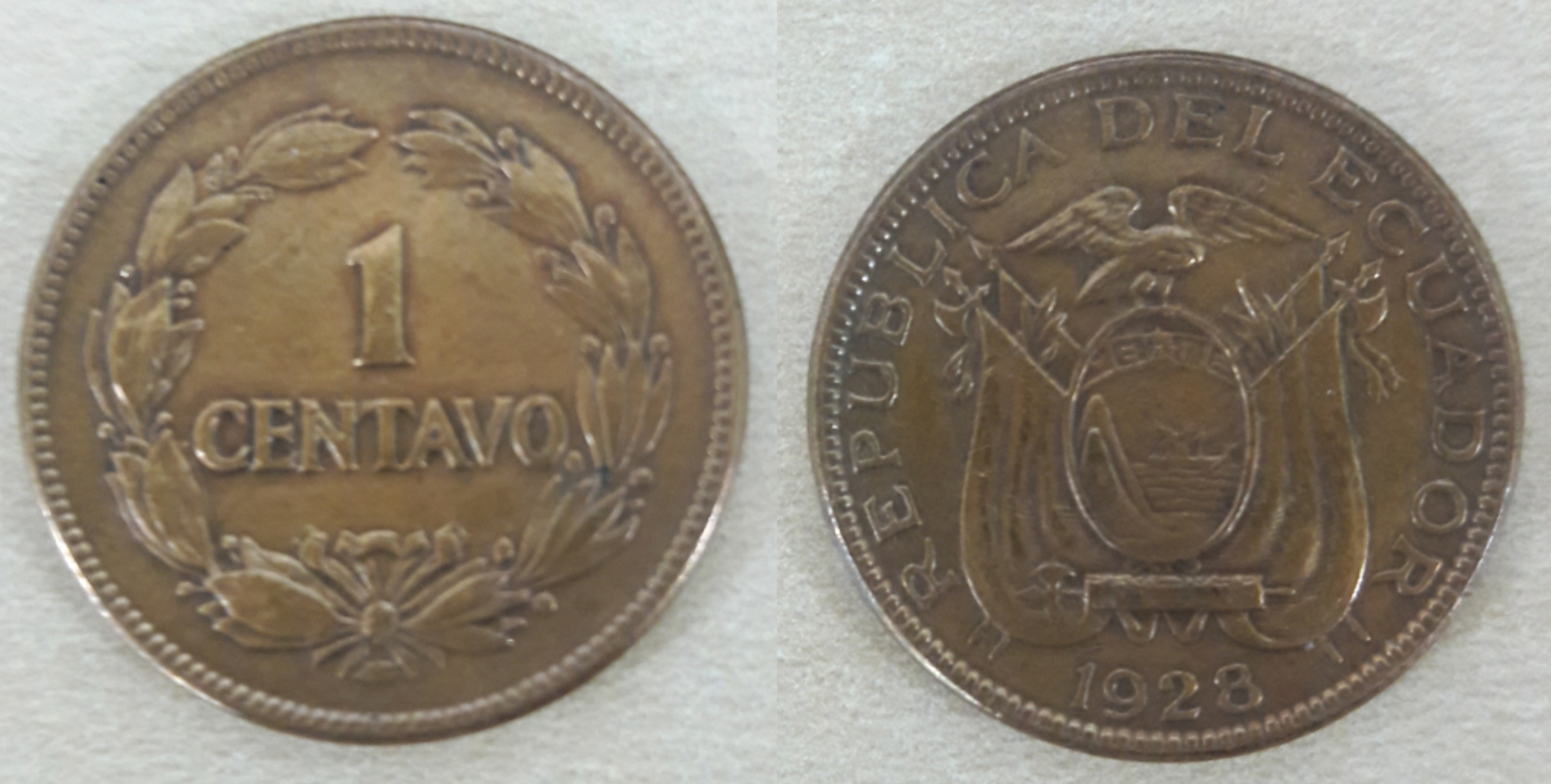
1928 one-centavo coin

In 1909, cupro-nickel 1, 2 and 5 centavo coins were issued, followed by 2 1/2 centavo in 1917 and 10 centavos in 1918. Production of silver coins was suspended in 1916. In 1928, a new coinage was introduced consisting of a bronze 1 centavo, nickel 2 1/2, 5, and 10 centavos; silver 50 centavos; 1 and 2 sucres; and gold 1 condor. The 1-sucre coin was reduced from 25 grams of 90% silver to 5 grams of 72% silver, while the condor, worth 25 sucres, was equivalent to a U.S. quarter eagle coin. The new coins were dubbed "Ayoras" after the president, Isidro Ayora. In 1937, nickel 20 centavo and 1 sucre coins were introduced, followed by brass 5, 10, and 20 centavos in 1942 and silver 5 sucres in 1943. The last silver coins (2 and 5 sucres) were struck in 1944.

Cupro-nickel replaced brass in the 5, 10, and 20 centavos in 1946, with a cupro-nickel 1 sucre introduced in 1959. 1959 also saw the introduction of nickel-clad-steel 20 centavos, with this metal replacing others in the 5, 10, and 50 centavos and 1 sucre between 1963 and 1970.

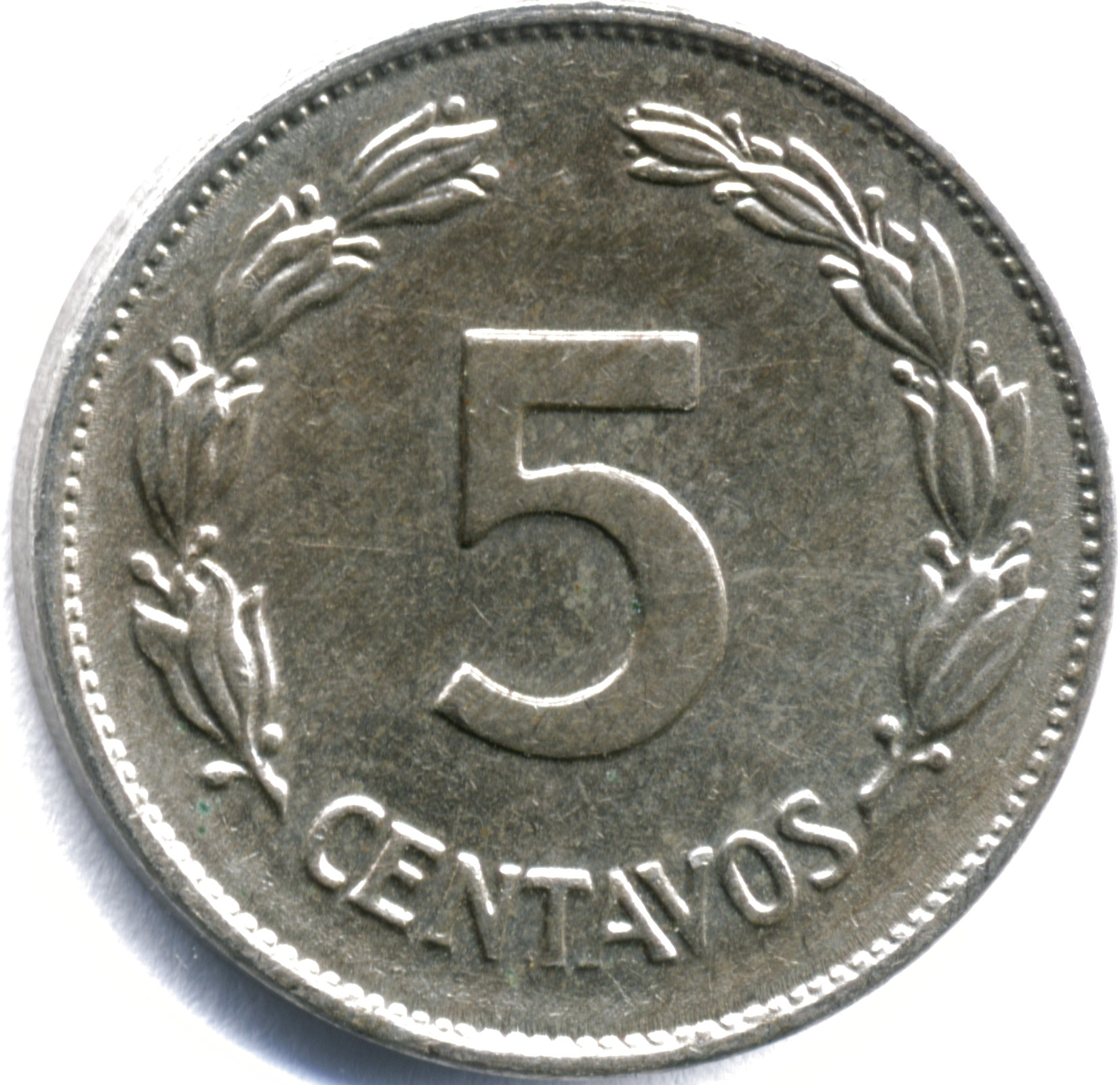
1946 five centavos coin

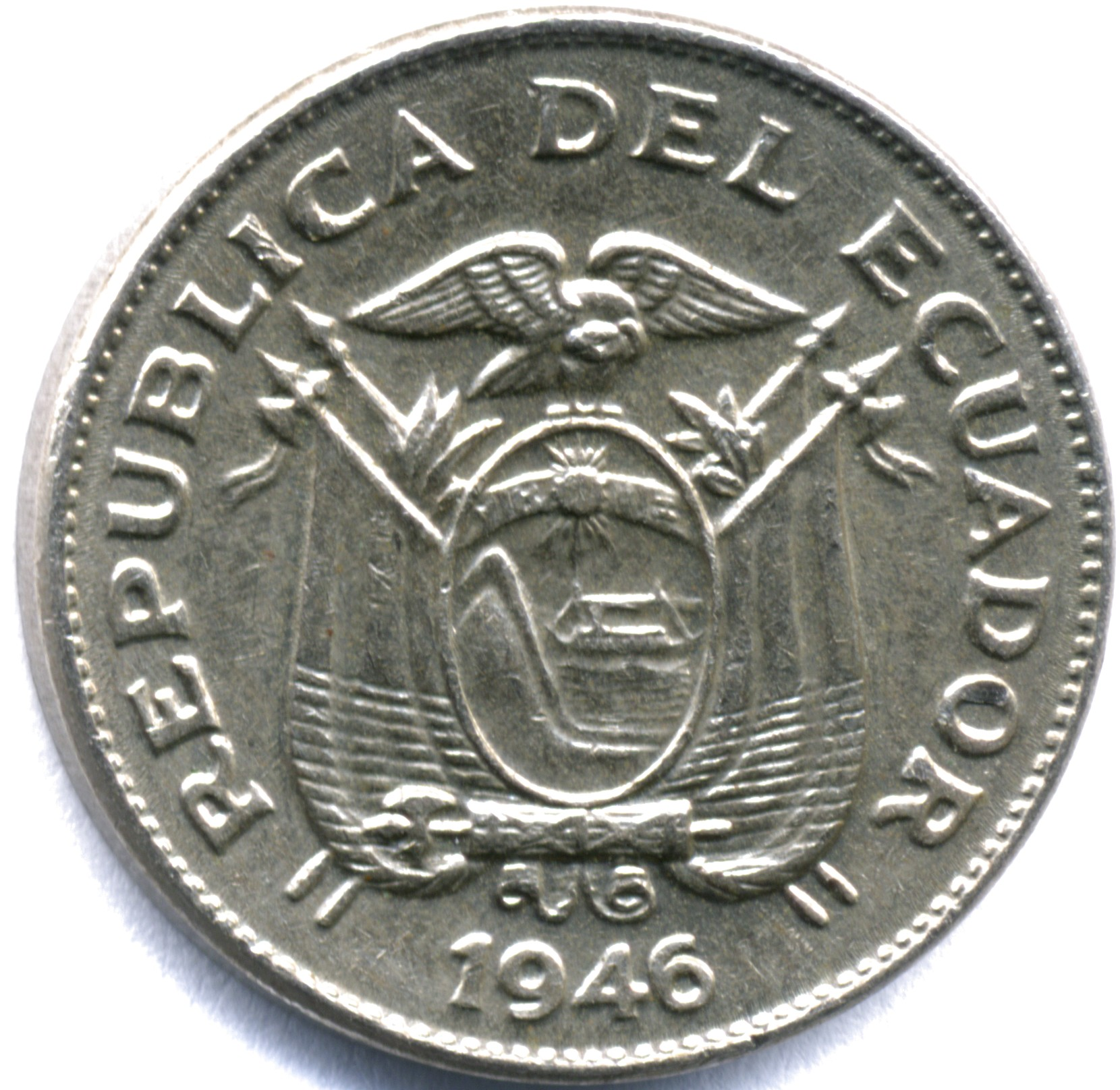
1946 five centavos coin

In 1988, nickel-clad steel coins for 10, 20, and 50 sucres were introduced, and high inflation in the 1990s resulted in the introduction of bimetallic coins for 100, 500, and 1000 sucres between 1995 and 1997.

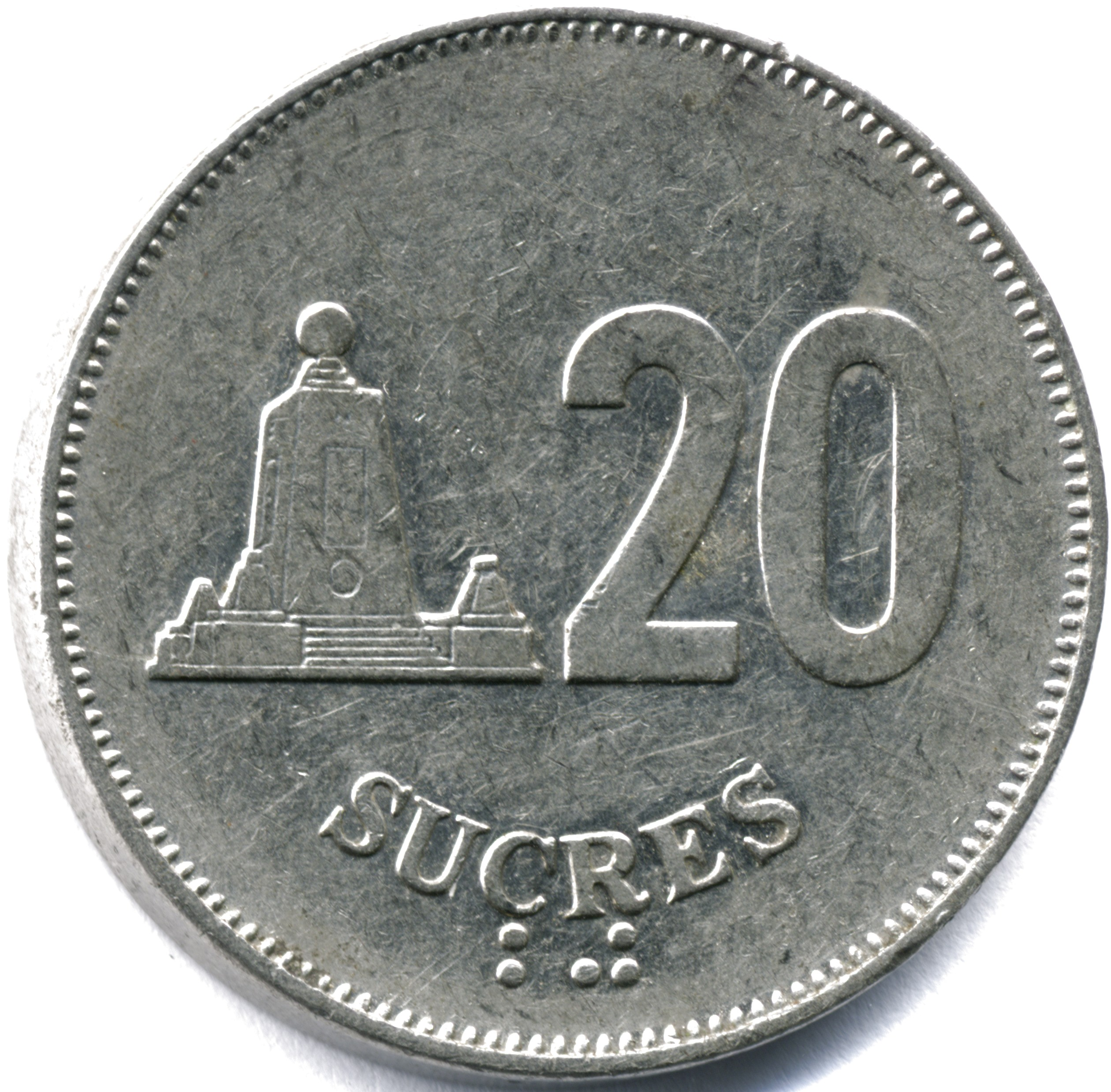
1988 twenty sucres coin

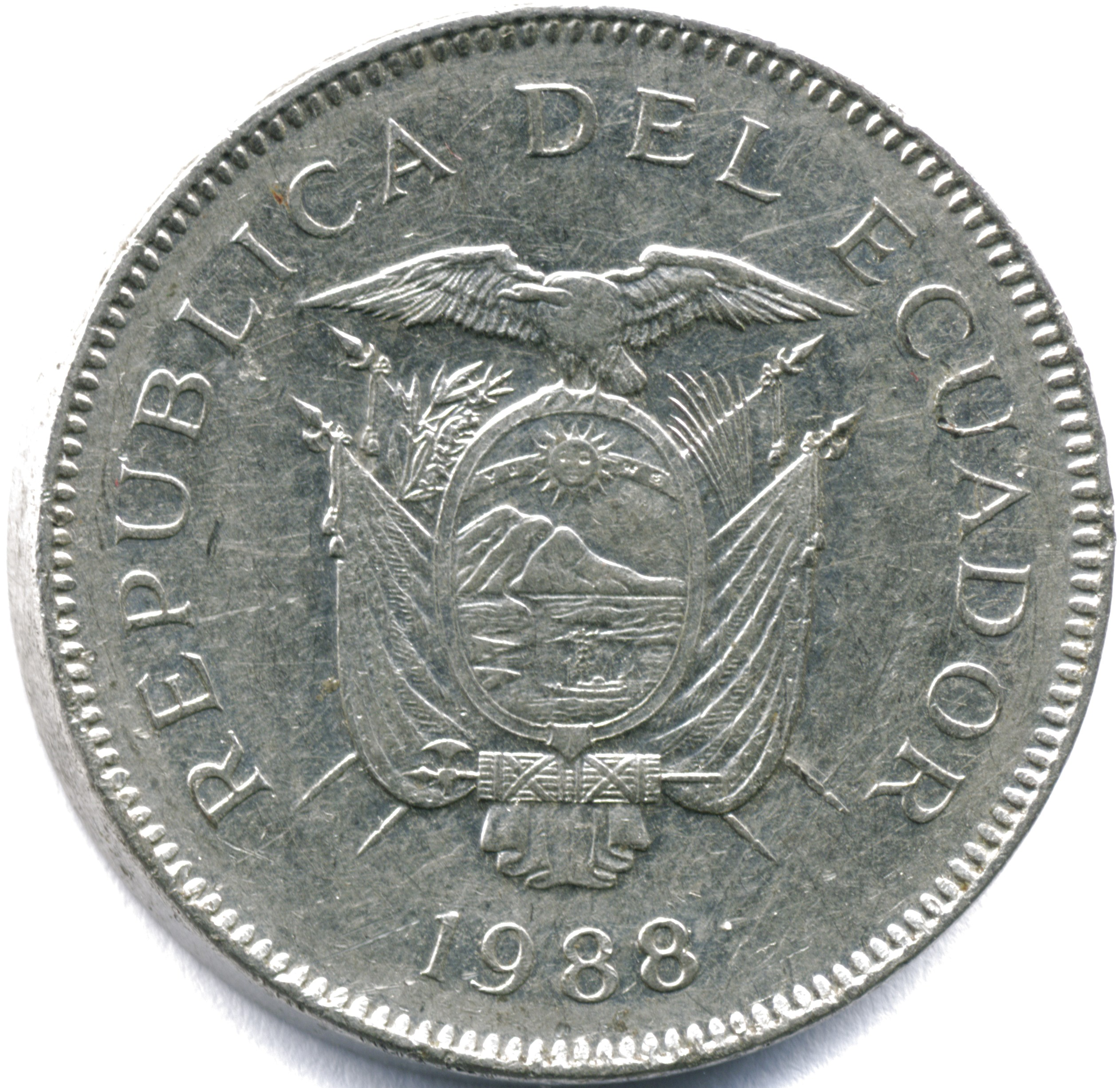
1988 twenty sucres coin

== Banknotes ==
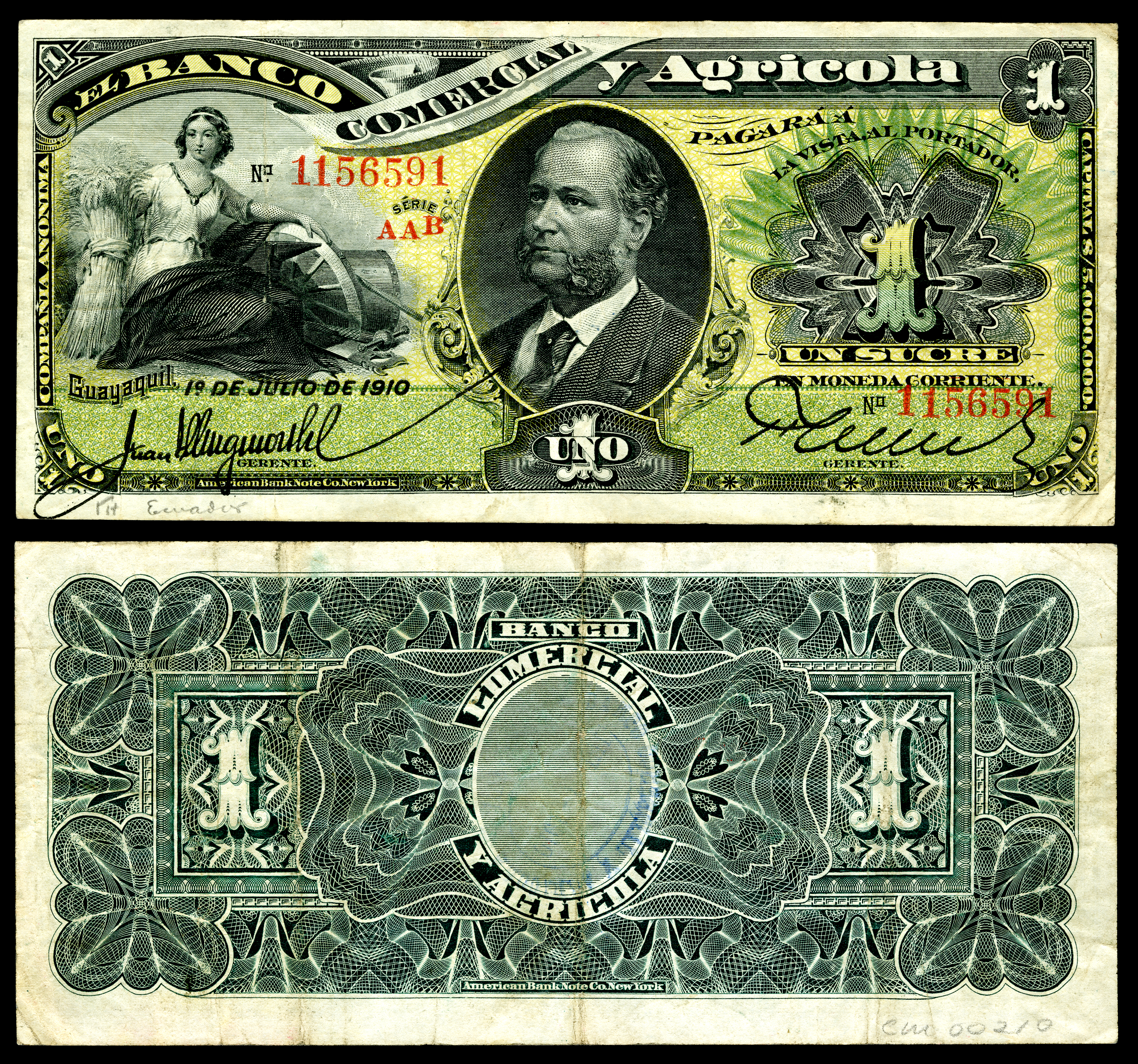
1 sucre (1910), Banco Comercial Y Agricola

Private banks issued the first banknotes denominated in sucres. The first Central Bank of Ecuador (Spanish: Banco Central del Ecuador Sociedad Anonima) issued provisional notes for 80 centavos and 4 sucres between 1885 and 1887 due to a conversion rate of 5 pesos = 4 sucres for the earlier notes of this bank. Regular notes were issued until 1926 in denominations of 1, 2, 5, 10, 20, 50, 100, 500, and 1000 sucres. 1-sucre notes were issued by the Banco Anglo-Ecuatoriano in 1885 and 1886 and by the Banco de Quito in 1885.

The Banco de la Unión issued notes between 1887 and 1895 in denominations of 1, 5, 10, 20, and 100 sucres, while the Banco Internacional issued notes between 1887 and 1894 in denominations of 1, 5, 10, 20, 100, 500, and 1000 sucres. The Banco Comercial y Agricola issued notes between 1895 and 1925 in denominations of 1, 5, 10, 20, 50, 100, 500, and 1000 sucres. The Banco del Pinchincha issued notes for 1, 5, 10, 20, 50, and 100 sucres between 1907 and 1924. The Banco del Azuay issued 1, 2, 5, and 10 sucre notes between 1914 and 1924. The Campañia de Crédito Agricola e Industrial issued 2 and 10 sucre notes in 1921. Finally, the Banco de Descuento issued 5- and 50-sucre notes in 1923 and 1924.

In 1926, the Caja Central de Emisión y Amortización was established to effect the transition of currency issues from private banks to a central bank. It issued notes in 1926 and 1927 in denominations of 1, 2, 5, 10, and 1000 sucres, which were overprints on the notes of private banks.

The first notes of the Central Bank were issued in 1928 in denominations of 5, 10, 20, 50, and 100 sucres. These notes had a gold redemption clause, promising the bearer of the currency its value in gold. (Spanish: Pagará al portador á la vista CINCO SUCRES en oro ó giros oro, lit. 'Pay the bearer on sight FIVE SUCRES in gold or gold exchange'). The gold clause was retained on Banco Central's notes until 1939, when the text was modified to Pagará al portador á la vista CINCO SUCRES. Additional denominations of 500 and 1000 sucres were authorized in 1944.

In 1949–1950, Banco Central introduced new notes of reduced size (157 × 68 mm) in denominations of 5, 10, 20, 50, and 100 sucres and dropped the phrase "Pagará al portador y a la vista" (will pay to the bearer on demand), leaving only the literal numerical value of the presidency. All banknotes circulated since 1928 had been printed by the American Bank Note Company, but Waterlow and Sons were now contracted to produce the 5 and 50 sucre notes, which were the first Ecuadorian notes to have a security thread. In the late 1950s, Waterlow was dropped in favor of Thomas de la Rue, which printed 5, 20, 50, and 100 sucre notes, while American Bank Note continued printing 5, 10, 20, and 100 sucre notes. Both printers' notes shared the same basic design; however, American Bank Note used collared planchets as a security device, while De La Rue employed a metal thread. These notes went through several modifications, and fluorescent security ink was introduced in about 1970. A small-size 1000-sucre note was finally put into circulation in 1973. The next change came in 1975, when the back of all circulating notes was redesigned to show the new national coat of arms. A small-sized 500-sucre note appeared at the end of the 1970s.

Beginning in 1984, the title Banco Central del Ecuador appears on the notes, without a printer's imprint and without Sociedad Anonima. As inflation gained momentum, higher denominations were introduced: 5,000 in 1987, 10,000 in 1988, and 20,000 and 50,000 sucre notes in 1995.

Obverse & reverse	Value (S/.)	Dimensions	Predominant color	Depicted celebrity (obverse)
	5	140 × 65 mm	Red	Antonio José de Sucre
	10	140 × 65 mm	Blue	Sebastián de Belalcázar
	20	140 × 65 mm	Cream	Compañía de Jesús, Quito
	50	140 × 65 mm	Green	Columna de los Próceres
	100	140 × 65 mm	Purple	Simon Bolivar
	500	140 × 65 mm	Blue	Dr. Eugenio de Santa Cruz y Espejo
	1000	140 × 65 mm	Green	Rumiñahui
	5,000	140 × 65 mm	Brown + purple	Juan Montalvo
	10,000	140 × 65 mm	Brown + green	Vicente Rocafuerte
	20,000	140 × 65 mm	Brown + blue	Gabriel García Moreno
	50,000	140 × 65 mm	Blue + red	Eloy Alfaro

Notes used during the last years of the sucre (together with 100, 500, and 1000 sucre coins) include:

- S/. 5,000 (Obverse: writer/author Juan Montalvo from Ambato. Reverse: Galápagos tortoise), worth (at dollarization time) US$0.20
- S/. 10,000 (Obverse: Ecuador's second (first Ecuadorian born) president Vicente Rocafuerte. Reverse: Independence Monument at Quito's main square (Plaza Grande), worth US$0.40
- S/. 20,000 (Obverse: former Conservative president Gabriel García Moreno. Reverse: Ecuador's coat of arms), worth US$0.80
- S/. 50,000 (Obverse: former Liberal president Eloy Alfaro Delgado; Reverse: Ecuador's coat of arms), worth US$2.00

== Historic exchange rates ==
Sucres per U.S. Dollar:

- 2.60 (1917)
- 16–17 (1959–1961)
- 25.00 (1979)
- 2,564.50 (1995)
- 3,189.50 (1996)
- 3,988.30 (1997)
- 5,446.60 (1998)
- 11,786.80 (1999)
- 25,000.00 (at dollarization time)

== See also ==
- Economy of Ecuador
- SUCRE (currency)
