= Rosalía Arteaga =

Ecuadorian politician (born 1956)

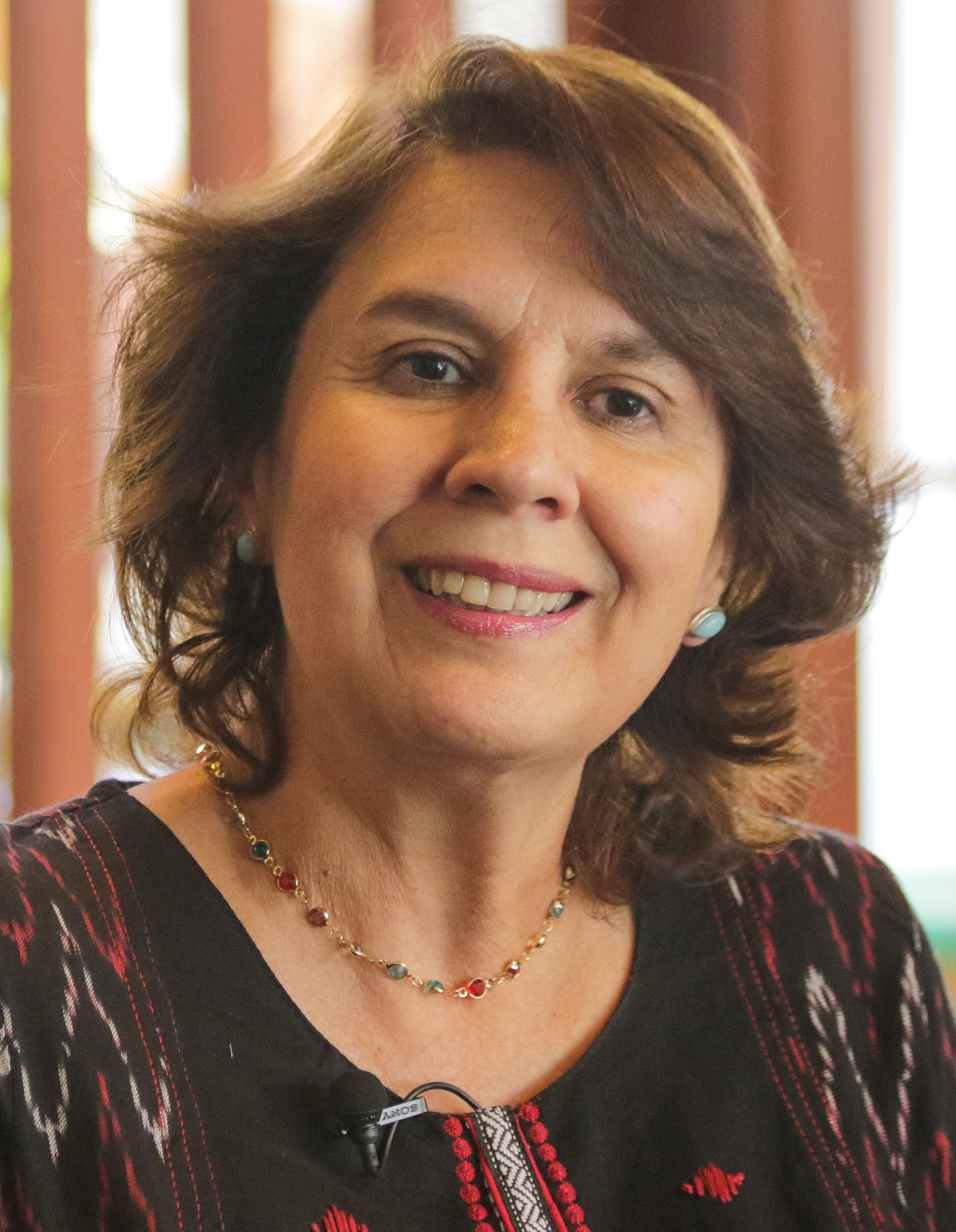
- Arteaga in 2018

39th President of Ecuador
- In office 9 February 1997 – 11 February 1997
- Vice President: Vacant
- Preceded by: Abdalá Bucaram; Fabián Alarcón (acting)
- Succeeded by: Fabián Alarcón

40th Vice President of Ecuador
- In office 11 February 1997 – 30 March 1998
- President: Fabián Alarcón
- Preceded by: Herself (Note: Arteaga left the role on 6 February after Abdalá Bucaram's impeachment. However, she was reinstated to her role after Fabián Alarcón retook the presidency.)
- Succeeded by: Pedro Aguayo Cubillo
- In office 10 August 1996 – 6 February 1997
- President: Abdalá Bucaram
- Preceded by: Eduardo Peña
- Succeeded by: Herself

Personal details
- Born: Lupe Rosalía Arteaga Serrano; 5 December 1956 (age 69) Cuenca, Azuay, Ecuador
- Party: Independent Movement for an Authentic Republic (1995–2001)
- Other political affiliations: Alfarista Radical Front (before 1995)
- Spouse: Pedro Fernández de Córdova Álvarez (divorced)
- Education: Pontificia Universidad Católica del Ecuador; University of Cuenca
- Occupation: Lawyer; politician; writer

Rosalía Arteaga Serrano (born 5 December 1956) is an Ecuadorian politician who served as the 39th president of Ecuador for two days in 1997 from 9 to 11 February. She previously served as the 40th vice president under President Abdalá Bucaram from 1996 until his removal from office 1997; when the vagueness of the constitution left uncertainty as to the vice president or the head of congress becoming president, Arteaga was sworn in, but was peacefully replaced two days later by congressional leader Fabián Alarcón. She continued as vice president under Alarcón until March 1998. She is the country's first ever female head of state.

Arteaga announced her intention to stand for secretary-general of the United Nations in the 2021 selection, though incumbent António Guterres was ultimately appointed to a second term in office.

== Early life and education ==
Arteaga was born in Cuenca, Ecuador and attended the University of Cuenca.

== Political career ==
=== First Vice Presidency (1996-1997) ===
Arteaga became vice president in 1996, following the election of Abdalá Bucaram as president. However, the first frictions between Bucaram and Arteaga became evident after just a month of being in power: when Bucaram traveled to the 10th Rio Group Summit in Cochabamba (Bolivia) in September 1996, he did not entrust her with power. Their problems were never overcome throughout the short-lived Bucaram administration.

=== Brief Presidency and Second Vice Presidency (1997-1998) ===
On 6 February 1997, President Bucaram was declared unfit to govern by Congress. Arteaga and congressional leader Fabián Alarcón became locked in a dispute over who should succeed Bucaram since the constitution was vague on the issue. Initially, Alarcón was sworn in with the support of Congress. On 9 February, however, Arteaga, who had insisted that, as Vice President, she should become president, was sworn in as Ecuador's first female president. Two days later, on 11 February, with the support of Congress and the army, Alarcón was sworn in again, and Arteaga resigned as president, reverting to her post as vice president. The political forces in Congress and, notably, the lack of a constitutional norm on vice presidential succession, eliminated by errors of codification during the Durán-Ballén era, did not allow Arteaga to succeed Bucaram.

Before Bucaram's dismissal, Arteaga had denounced that a coup d'état was being planned by Alarcón in Congress. Consequently, the antipathy between Arteaga, who earlier claimed for herself the Presidency, and Alarcón became immediately evident. Because of this, the first decrees of Alarcón as interim president were to remove the coordination of the social front from the Vice Presidency. Later, Arteaga was also prevented from managing the Nuevo Rumbo Cultural program, the remodelling of the Sucre National Theatre, and the committee for the construction of new airports as Alarcón's delegate at the National Development Council (CONADE). Finally, she was stripped of her representation in the National Security Council. In the 14 months that Arteaga served in the Alarcón government, the Vice Presidency lost functions within the state structure and as a development-planning body. Her role was, for all purposes, ceremonial limited to solemnizing inaugurations, processing orders, and sponsoring social events. Moreover, like Bucaram before him, in five of the eight trips abroad that Alarcón made, Vice President Arteaga was not entrusted with power.

Arteaga continued to clash with Alarcón and took every opportunity, whether interviewed by international journalists and correspondents or while abroad, to denounce the unconstitutionality of the Alarcón government. She denounced that Ecuador was experiencing a de facto regime, also earning the antipathy of the military in the process. Finally, when, as she put it, it became "an absurd [to continue] being Vice President," she resigned from the vice presidency in March 1998. She then ran for president in the elections that were held in May 1998 and finished fifth, receiving only 5% of the vote.

== Post-presidency ==
Arteaga was secretary-general of the Amazon Cooperation Treaty Organization until 2007 and is a member of the editorial board of the Encyclopædia Britannica. She continues to receive a lifetime pension from the Ecuadorian government of $48,690 annually.

With the support of "Forward", a civil society organization, Arteaga announced her intention to seek the position of secretary-general of the United Nations in the 2021 selection. However, incumbent António Guterres was successfully appointed to a second consecutive term as Secretary-General.

Arteaga holds several leadership roles at philanthropic and social justice foundations, including President of the Foundation for the Integration and Development of Latin America, Founder of the Rosalia Arteaga Glocal Women Foundation, and Honorary Academician of the Royal European Academy of Doctors-Barcelona 1914 (RAED).

== Publications ==
- Jerońimo (1992) — A reflective memoir written by Arteaga, inspired by her personal experience as the mother of a child with special needs. The book explores themes of love, loss, and transformation, and has been translated into multiple languages, including English, Chinese, Portuguese, Italian, and Braille. In a 2021 interview, Arteaga further discussed the motivations behind writing the book and its emotional resonance.

== Notes ==
Political offices
Preceded by Eduardo Peña	Vice President of Ecuador; 1996–1998	Succeeded by Pedro Aguayo Cubillo
Preceded by Fabián Alarcón; Acting	President of Ecuador; 1997	Succeeded by Fabián Alarcón; Acting
