= Paula María Bertol =

Argentine politician

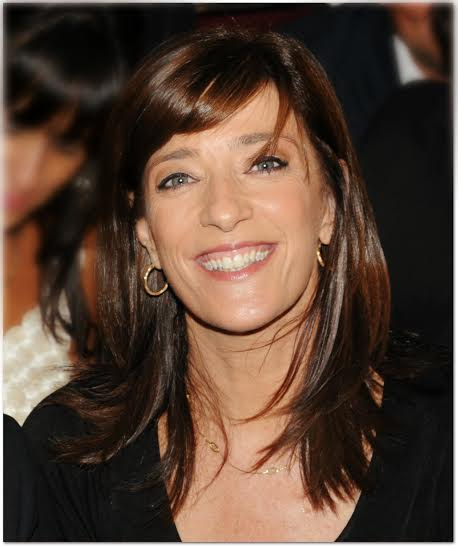
Paula Bertol

Paula María Bertol (born 22 February 1965) is an Argentinian legislator. She is a member of PRO and favored a ban on indoor smoking. She is on the Global Organization of Parliamentarians Against Corruption board and received an "Award for Innovative Legislation" from the Civil Society Network.
