= Gustavo Noboa =

President of Ecuador from 2000 to 2003

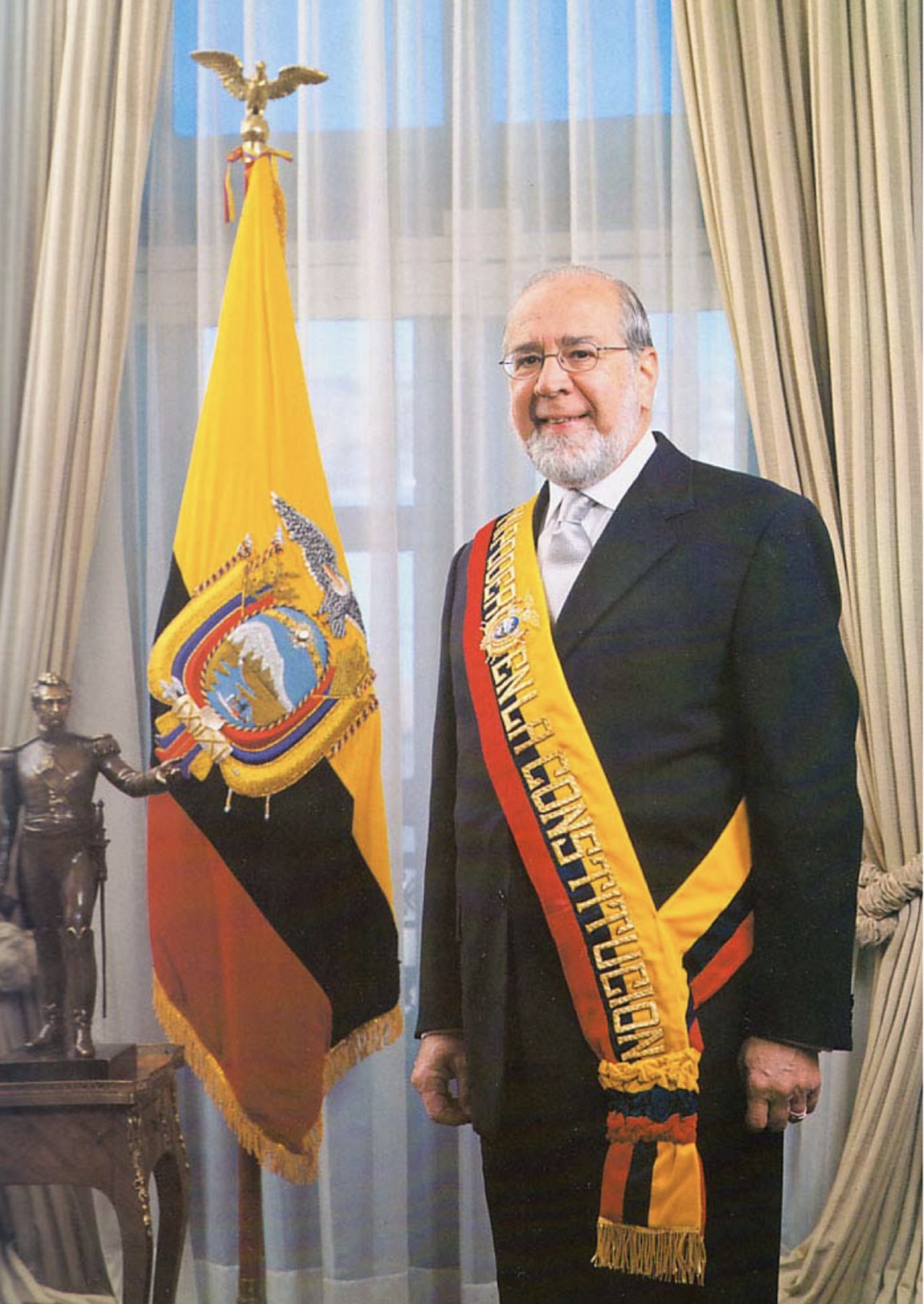
- Noboa in 2000

42nd President of Ecuador
- In office 22 January 2000 – 15 January 2003
- Vice President: Pedro Pinto Rubianes
- Preceded by: Jamil Mahuad
- Succeeded by: Lucio Gutiérrez

42nd Vice President of Ecuador
- In office 10 August 1998 – 21 January 2000
- President: Jamil Mahuad
- Preceded by: Pedro Aguayo Cubillo
- Succeeded by: Pedro Pinto Rubianes

Governor of Guayas
- In office March 1983 – August 1984
- Succeeded by: Jaime Nebot

Personal details
- Born: Gustavo José Joaquín Noboa Bejarano; 21 August 1937 Guayaquil, Ecuador
- Died: 16 February 2021 (aged 83) Miami, Florida, United States
- Party: Popular Democracy
- Spouse: María Isabel Baquerizo
- Education: University of Guayaquil

Gustavo José Joaquín Noboa Bejarano (21 August 1937 – 16 February 2021) was an Ecuadorian politician who served as the 42nd president of Ecuador from 22 January 2000 to 15 January 2003. Previously he served as the 42nd vice president under President Jamil Mahuad from 1998 until 2000. From 1983 until 1984, he also was the Governor of the province of Guayas.

Born in Guayaquil, Noboa's political career began when he was appointed Governor of the Guayas Province by President Osvaldo Hurtado in 1983 where left the role the following year. In 1998, Noboa was the running mate of Jamil Mahuad, where their ticket won and Noboa became vice president.

On 21 January 2000, after growing discontent with the people of Ecuador, especially the Indigenous people of his handling of the severe economic crisis, Mahuad was ousted in a coup d'état led by Colonel Lucio Gutiérrez. Noboa eventually became president and was officially sworn in the following day. His government attempted to revive the country's economy.

Noboa left office in January 2003 and was succeeded by Lucio Gutiérrez, the leader of the coup that deposed Mahuad. Shortly after leaving office, Noboa was convicted of charges and fled the country where he was given asylum in the Dominican Republic. However, he was subsequently placed under house arrest in 2005, but was later lifted the following year.

== Political career ==
Noboa was governor of Guayas Province from March 1983 to August 1984. In the 1998 presidential elections he was the running mate of Jamil Mahuad, who won. He was sworn in as Vice President of Ecuador on 10 August 1998.

== Presidency (2000–2003) ==
On 21 January 2000, a military coup deposed Mahuad's government and the following day Noboa became President of Ecuador in constitutional order.

Noboa's presidency was marked by attempts to revive the Ecuadorian economy, which was in a recession at the time, including the freeing of US$400 million worth of assets frozen by the previous government. He left office in 2003 after Lucio Gutiérrez was elected president in the 2002 presidential election.

== Post presidency ==
Noboa was accused of mishandling the country's foreign debt by the former president, León Febres Cordero.

After his term ended, accusations of irregularities in foreign debt negotiation that cost the country $9 billion dollars were levelled at the former president. He completely denied the charges and applied for political asylum in the Dominican Republic, which was granted on 11 August 2003.

The Supreme Court case against him was annulled by an unconstitutional, yet functioning, Supreme Court on the grounds that the case was not initiated by a two-thirds congressional vote as the Constitution stipulates. However, he was placed under house arrest in May 2005 and Ecuador's Interior Minister planned to prosecute. On 16 March 2006, a Supreme Court judge lifted the detention order and charged Noboa with being an accessory after the fact.

== Personal life ==
Noboa was born in Guayaquil. He studied political and social sciences and obtained a Doctor in Law from the University of Guayaquil. He was chancellor of the University from 1986 until 1996 and also taught law there.

Noboa died on 16 February 2021 after suffering a heart attack while in recovery from surgery for a brain tumor at Jackson Memorial Hospital in Miami, Florida. He was 83.

== Honours ==
=== National ===
- Ecuador:
  - Grand Master and Grand Collar of the National Order of San Lorenzo
  - Grand Master and Grand Collar of the National Order of Merit

=== Foreign ===
- Bolivia:
  - Grand Collar of the Order of the Condor of the Andes - 30 November 2001
- Brazil:
  - Grand Collar of the Order of the Southern Cross - 28 September 2001
- Chile:
  - Collar of the Order of the Merit of Chile - 18 October 2000
- Colombia:
  - Grand Collar of the Order of Boyacá - 23 August 2000
- Costa Rica:
  - Grand Cross with Golden Plaque of the National Order of Juan Mora Fernández - 6 December 2001
- Dominican Republic:
  - Grand Cross with Gold Breast Star of the Order of Merit of Duarte, Sánchez and Mella - 15 February 2002
  - Grand Cross with Gold Breast Star of the Order of Christopher Columbus - 18 November 2002
- Holy See:
  - Knight Commander of the Order of St. Sylvester - 1979
  - Knight Commander with Star of the Order of St. Gregory the Great - 8 March 1996
  - Knight with the Collar of the Order of Pope Pius IX - 8 December 2002
- Peru:
  - Grand Cross of the Order of the Sun of Peru - 17 September 1999
  - Grand Cross of the Order of Merit for Distinguished Service - 15 October 2001
  - Grand Cross with Diamonds of the Order of the Sun of Peru - 5 March 2002
- SMOM:
  - Collar pro Merito Melitensi - 10 October 2000
- South Korea:
  - Recipient of the Grand Order of Mugunghwa - 21 March 2001
- Spain:
  - Collar of the Order of Isabella the Catholic - 6 July 2001

Government offices
Preceded by Jamil Mahuad	President of Ecuador; 22 January 2000 – 15 January 2003	Succeeded by Lucio Gutiérrez
Preceded by Pedro Aguayo Cubillo	Vice President of Ecuador; 10 August 1998 – 21 January 2000	Succeeded by Pedro Pinto Rubianes
