= 1998 Ecuadorian general election =

Presidential and congressional election in Ecuador

- Presidential election
- 31 May 1998 (first round); 12 July 1998 (second round)
- Registered: 7,072,496
- Turnout: 64.16% (first round); 70.13% (second round)
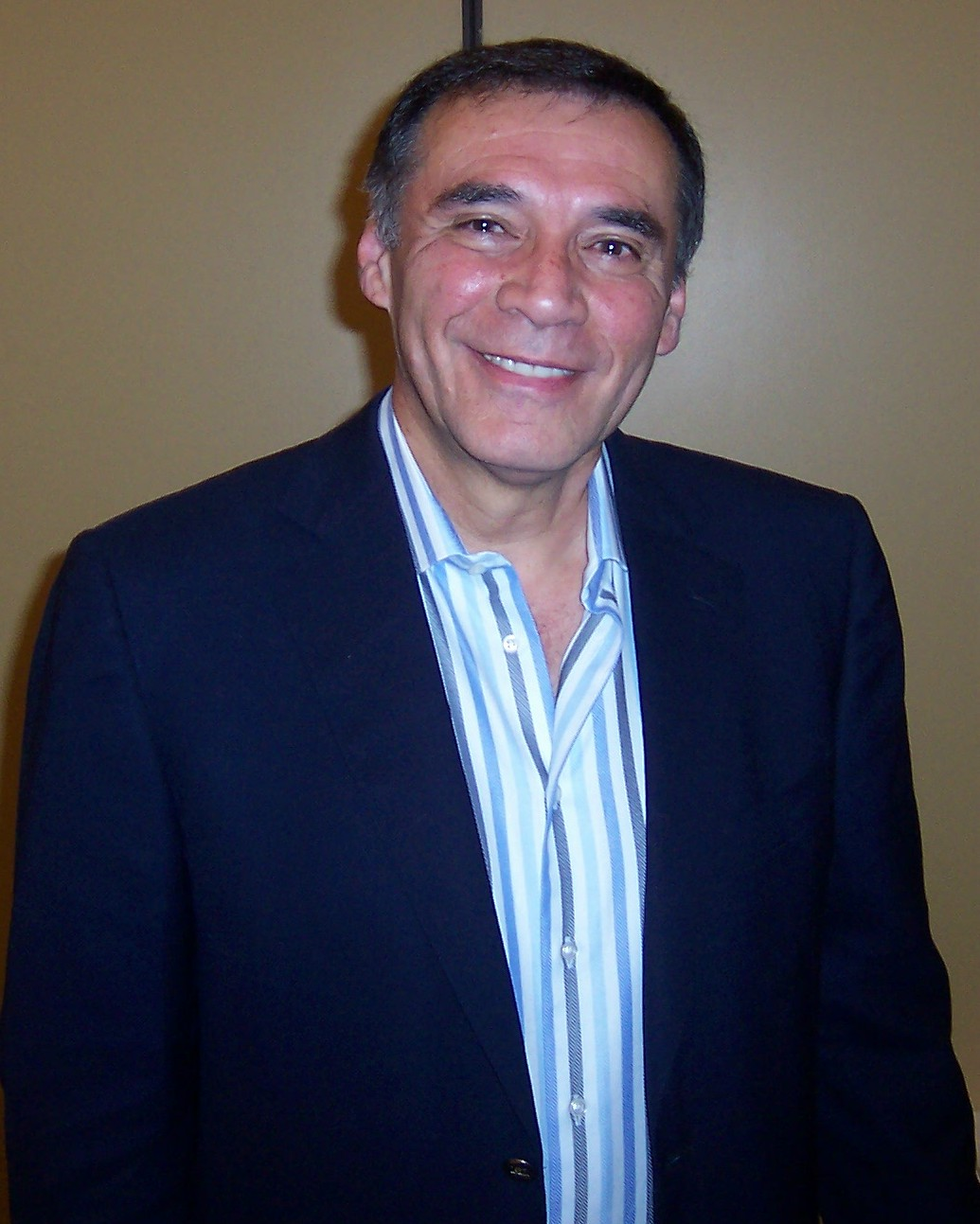

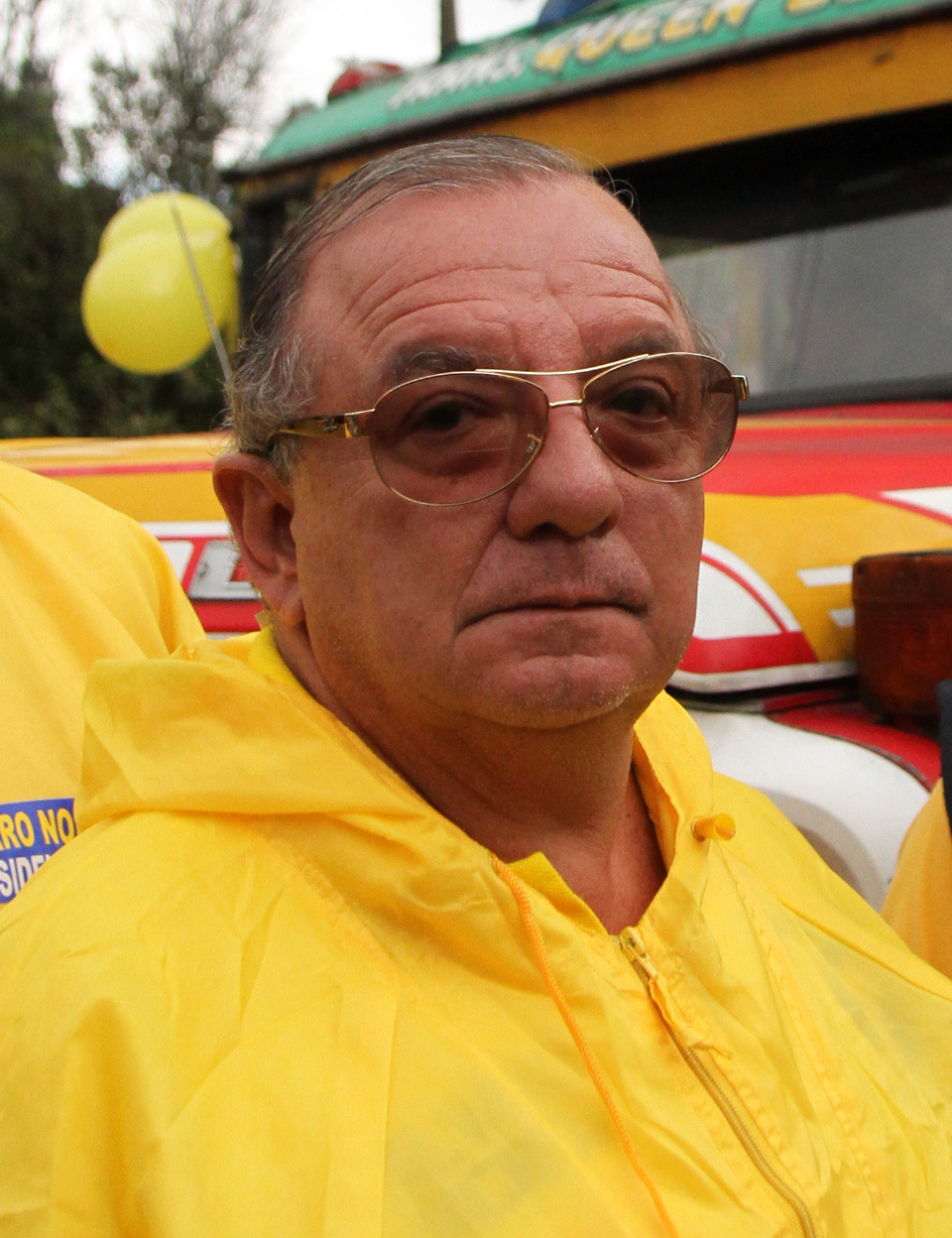
Nominee	Jamil Mahuad	Álvaro Noboa
Party	Popular Democracy	PRE
Running mate	Gustavo Noboa	Alfredo Castillo
Popular vote	2,243,000	2,140,481
Percentage	51.17%	48.83%
President before election
Fabian Alarcon
FRA
Elected President
Jamil Mahuad
Democracia Popular

General elections were held in Ecuador on 31 May 1998, with a second round of the presidential elections on 12 July. The result was a victory for Jamil Mahuad of the Popular Democracy (DP) party, who won the run-off with 51.2% of the vote. The DP alliance also emerged as the largest party in the National Congress, winning 32 of the 120 seats.

== Background ==
Following the 1996 general elections, President Abdalá Bucaram was removed from office by Congress nine months later on grounds of mental incapacity. Fabian Alarcon thereupon took his place as caretaker Head of State.

== Contestants ==
The leading contestants of the six (including two women) vying for the presidency were Jamil Mahuad (DP), the mayor of Quito, and Álvaro Noboa (Ecuadorian Roldosist Party), a wealthy businessman. Campaign debates were marked by personal accusations of drug links and threatened lawsuits between the two rivals, alongside statements on substantive policy questions relating primarily to corruption and the country's ailing economy. Problems in this latter sector (high inflation, budget deficit) had been aggravated by the sociological and infrastructural damage caused by the climatic phenomenon known as El Niño and the worldwide drop in oil prices, Ecuador's main export earner. Mahuad advocated an intense program of private investment to achieve a 5% annual growth rate, privatizations, job creation and housing construction.

== Results ==
=== President ===
Candidate	Running mate	Party	First round		Second round	
Candidate	Running mate	Party	Votes	%	Votes	%
Jamil Mahuad	Gustavo Noboa	Popular Democracy	1,342,114	34.92	2,243,000	51.17
Álvaro Noboa	Alfredo Castillo	Ecuadorian Roldosist Party	1,022,667	26.61	2,140,481	48.83
Rodrigo Borja Cevallos	Carlos Baquerizo	Democratic Left	619,581	16.12		
Freddy Ehlers	Jorge Gallardo	Pachakutik	566,917	14.75		
Rosalía Arteaga	Guido Carranza	Independent Movement for an Authentic Republic	195,000	5.07		
María Eugenia Lima	Ricardo Ramírez	Democratic People's Movement	97,522	2.54		
Total			3,843,801	100.00	4,383,481	100.00
Valid votes			3,843,801	84.71	4,383,481	88.38
Invalid/blank votes			694,021	15.29	576,594	11.62
Total votes			4,537,822	100.00	4,960,075	100.00
Registered voters/turnout			7,072,496	64.16	7,072,496	70.13
Source: Nohlen

=== National Congress ===
Party	First round		Second round		Seats	+/–
Party	Votes	%	Votes	%	Seats	+/–
Social Christian Party	839,567	23.80	5,114,369	23.49	28	+1
Popular Democracy	669,473	18.98	6,008,940	27.60	35	+24
Ecuadorian Roldosist Party	628,265	17.81	4,429,114	20.34	22	+3
Democratic Left	544,088	15.42	3,006,737	13.81	17	+13
MUPP–PSFA	325,365	9.22	127,891	0.59	8	–
Conservative Party	184,048	5.22			3	+2
Democratic People's Movement	151,096	4.28	980,253	4.50	2	0
Alfarista Radical Front	54,137	1.53	559,548	2.57	2	–
National Alfarismo Party	51,515	1.46			0	–
Concentration of People's Forces	37,507	1.06	241,002	1.11	1	0
Ecuadorian Revolutionary Popular Action	28,837	0.82	180,399	0.83	0	–2
Latin American People's Union	14,043	0.40	145,410	0.67	0	0
Other parties and independents			980,253	4.50	3	–
Total	3,527,941	100.00	21,773,916	100.00	121	+39
Valid votes	3,527,941	77.75	2,525,491	72.60		
Invalid/blank votes	1,009,881	22.25	953,033	27.40		
Total votes	4,537,822	100.00	3,478,524	100.00		
Registered voters/turnout	7,072,496	64.16	7,072,496	49.18		
Source: Nohlen, OPLAL
