= Fabián Alarcón =

President of Ecuador from 1997 to 1998

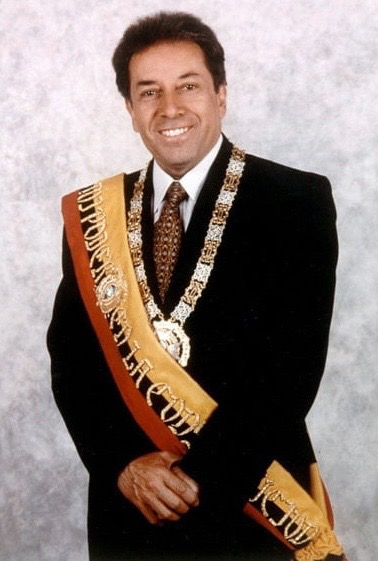
- Official portrait, 1997

40th President of Ecuador
- In office 11 February 1997 – 10 August 1998
- Vice President: Rosalía Arteaga (1997–1998); Pedro Aguayo (Mar–Aug 1998)
- Preceded by: Rosalía Arteaga
- Succeeded by: Jamil Mahuad
- Acting; 6 February 1997 – 9 February 1997
- Vice President: Vacant
- Preceded by: Abdalá Bucaram
- Succeeded by: Rosalía Arteaga

President of the National Congress
- In office 10 August 1995 – 6 February 1997
- Preceded by: Heinz Moeller
- Succeeded by: Heinz Moeller
- In office 14 August 1991 – 10 August 1992
- Preceded by: Edelberto Bonilla
- Succeeded by: Carlos Vallejo López

Personal details
- Born: 14 April 1947 (age 79) Quito, Ecuador
- Party: Alfarista Radical Front
- Spouse: Lucía Peña Ochoa
- Education: Pontificia Universidad Católica del Ecuador

Fabián Ernesto Alarcón Rivera (born 14 April 1947) is an Ecuadorian former politician who served as the 40th president of Ecuador from 1997 to 1998. He previously served as the president of the National Congress from 1991 to 1992 and again from 1995 to 1997.

When President Abdalá Bucaram was impeached on 6 February 1997, Alarcón, as president of the National Congress, became acting president. However, three days later on 9 February, Bucaram's vice president, Rosalía Arteaga, became president, causing a political crisis on who should succeed Bucaram. However, Alarcón became president again with support of Congress and the military, with Arteaga retaking her previous role as vice president.

In 1998, Alarcón called for general elections to be held where he did not participate. He was succeeded by Jamil Mahuad. Alarcón was arrested on corruption charges in 1999, but was later released. Until Rafael Correa in 2013, no other Ecuadorian presidents would serve a full term since Sixto Durán Ballén.

== Life ==
Alarcón was born in Quito. His father, Ruperto Alarcón, was a former president of the Chamber of Deputies.

He was the President of the National Congress from 1991 to 1992 and then again from August 1995 to February 1997, when he was made acting president due to the impeachment of President Abdalá Bucaram. This deepened the political crisis in Ecuador as vice-president Rosalía Arteaga challenged Alarcón's assumption of the presidency. Arteaga then became president for two days, but Alarcón was restored. He gave up the presidency after early elections were held in 1998, in which he did not run. In 1999 he was arrested on corruption charges, but was later released. Alarcón is a member of the Alfarista Radical Front. He continues to receive a lifetime pension from the Ecuadorian government of $38,800 annually.

He ran for mayor of Quito in 1988 and 1992, losing both times.

Preceded by Abdalá Bucaram	President of Ecuador; 6 February 1997 - 9 February 1997	Succeeded by Rosalía Arteaga
Preceded by Rosalía Arteaga	President of Ecuador; 11 February 1997 – August 10, 1998	Succeeded by Jamil Mahuad
