= Jamil Mahuad =

President of Ecuador between 1998 and 2000

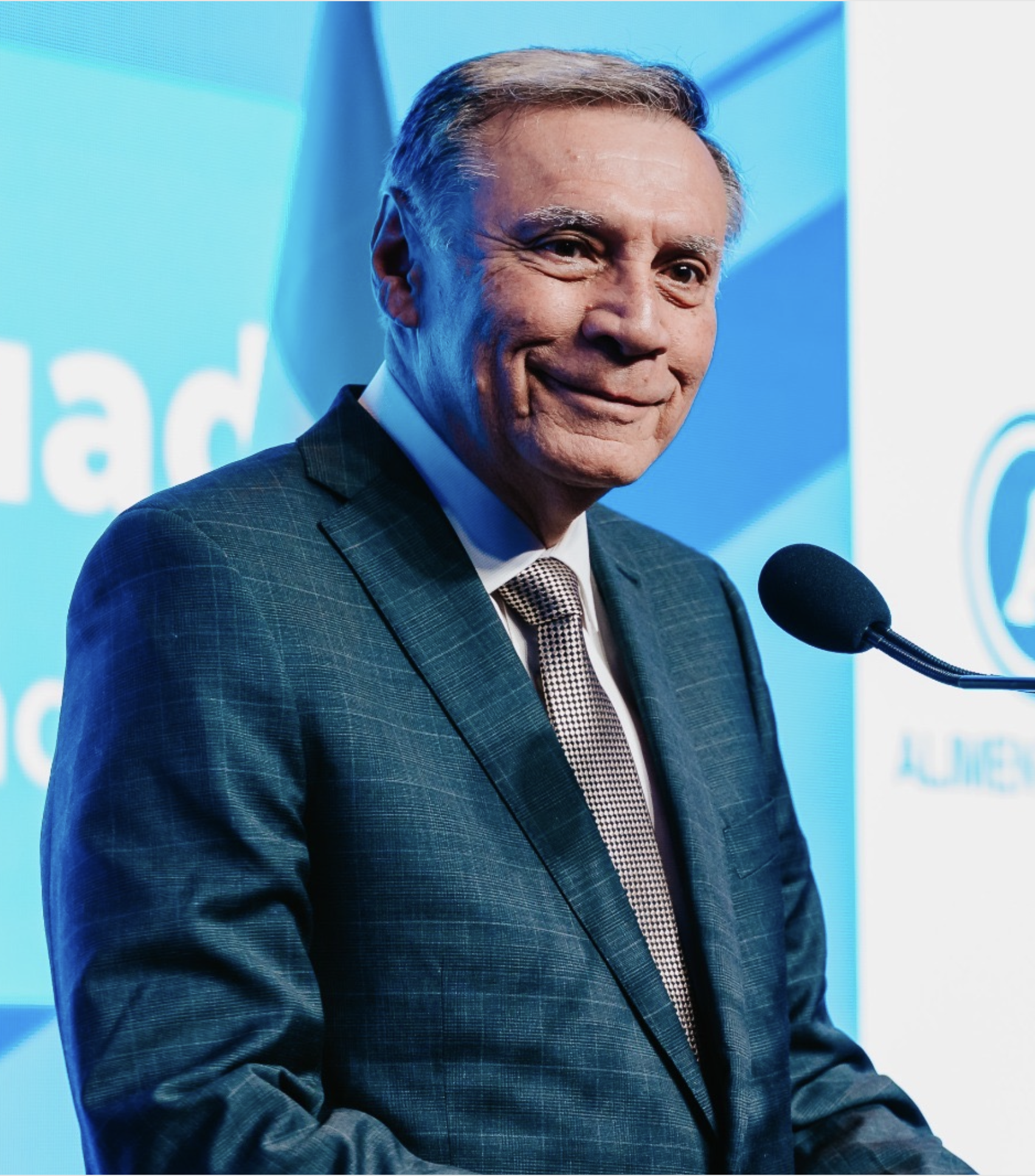
- Mahuad in 2022

41st President of Ecuador
- In office 10 August 1998 – 21 January 2000
- Vice President: Gustavo Noboa
- Preceded by: Fabián Alarcón
- Succeeded by: Gustavo Noboa

17th Metropolitan Mayor of Quito
- In office 10 August 1992 – 10 August 1998
- Preceded by: Rodrigo Paz
- Succeeded by: Roque Sevilla

Personal details
- Born: Jorge Jamil Mahuad Witt; 29 July 1949 (age 77) Loja, Ecuador
- Party: Popular Democracy
- Spouse: Tatiana Calderón (m. 1971)
- Children: Paola Mahuad Calderón
- Education: Pontificia Universidad Católica del Ecuador

Jorge Jamil Mahuad Witt (born 29 July 1949) is an Ecuadorian lawyer, academic and former politician who served the 41st president of Ecuador from 1998 until he was deposed in a coup in 2000. He previously served as the 17th mayor of Quito from 1992 to 1998.

Born in Loja of German and Lebanese descent, Mahuad grew up studying law. He studied in the Pontificia Universidad Católica del Ecuador and earned a law degree from Harvard University.

In 1988, Mahuad entered politics and ran unsuccessfully for the presidency in the elections held that year. He then became the Metropolitan Mayor of Quito in 1992. In 1998, Mahuad ran again for the presidency in the elections and narrowly won against Álvaro Noboa, the richest man in the country at the time. However, Noboa refused to concede and demanded a recount, which was denied by the authorities responsible.

Mahuad signed a historic agreement with Peru during his presidency, which solved long-standing border disputed between the two. At the same time however, there was a severe economic crisis in the country due to the Asian financial crisis the previous year. Mahuad decided to dollarize the country's economy which caused outrage across the country and eroded public support. The indigenous Ecudorians protested against Mahuad and he was eventually deposed in a coup d'état led by Lucio Gutiérrez and Mahuad's vice president, Gustavo Noboa, became president according to constitutional order.

== Early life ==
Mahuad was born in Loja, Ecuador. He is of Lebanese and German descent.

Mahuad attended Harvard University's John F. Kennedy School of Government, where he received a Master of Public Administration in 1989. He was a US State Department–sponsored Fulbright Fellow.

Harvard University published a case study on Mahuad, called "Leadership and Negotiation: Ending the Western Hemisphere's Longest Running Border Conflict."

== Presidency ==
Mahuad initially ran in the presidential election of 1988, coming in a distant fifth place. He then served as mayor of Quito from 1992 to 1998.

Ten years after his first presidential run, he won the presidential election by a very close margin. Álvaro Noboa, the defeated candidate, asked for a vote recount, which was denied by the authority responsible. There was a severe economic crisis in Ecuador (including the 1998–99 Ecuador banking crisis), which had led to a 60% cut in the armed forces budget. Mahuad's popularity rating fell from 60% in October 1998 to 6% in January 2000. In the final days of 1999, he announced the dollarization of the economy of Ecuador, along with a number of International Monetary Fund measures.

Mahuad was forced to resign after a week of demonstrations by indigenous Ecuadorians and a military revolt led by Lucio Gutiérrez.

He proposed economic reforms that produced the "dollarization" of the economy. He declared a freeze in bank accounts in order to control rampant inflation. This caused massive unrest as the lower classes struggled to convert their now useless Ecuadorian sucres to US dollars and lost wealth, while the upper classes (whose members already had their wealth invested in US dollars) gained wealth in turn. Under Mahuad's recession-plagued term, the economy shrank significantly, and inflation reached levels of up to 60 percent.

During Mahuad's presidency, a historic peace agreement with Peru was signed, resolving long-standing border disputes. Under the agreement, Ecuador renounced its claims to sovereignty of the disputed territory under the Rio de Janeiro Protocol, and in return, Peru deeded ownership of one km² of territory to Ecuador. Mahuad concluded the peace with Peru on 26 October 1998.

== Post-presidency ==
Mahuad is also a senior advisor at CMI International Group in Cambridge, Massachusetts.

In May 2014, Ecuador’s National Court of Justice sentenced him to twelve years jail term on embezzlement charges.

Political offices
Preceded by Fabián Alarcón	President of Ecuador; 10 August 1998-January 21, 2000	Succeeded by Gustavo Noboa
