= Economy of Ecuador =

Latin American, export-based system

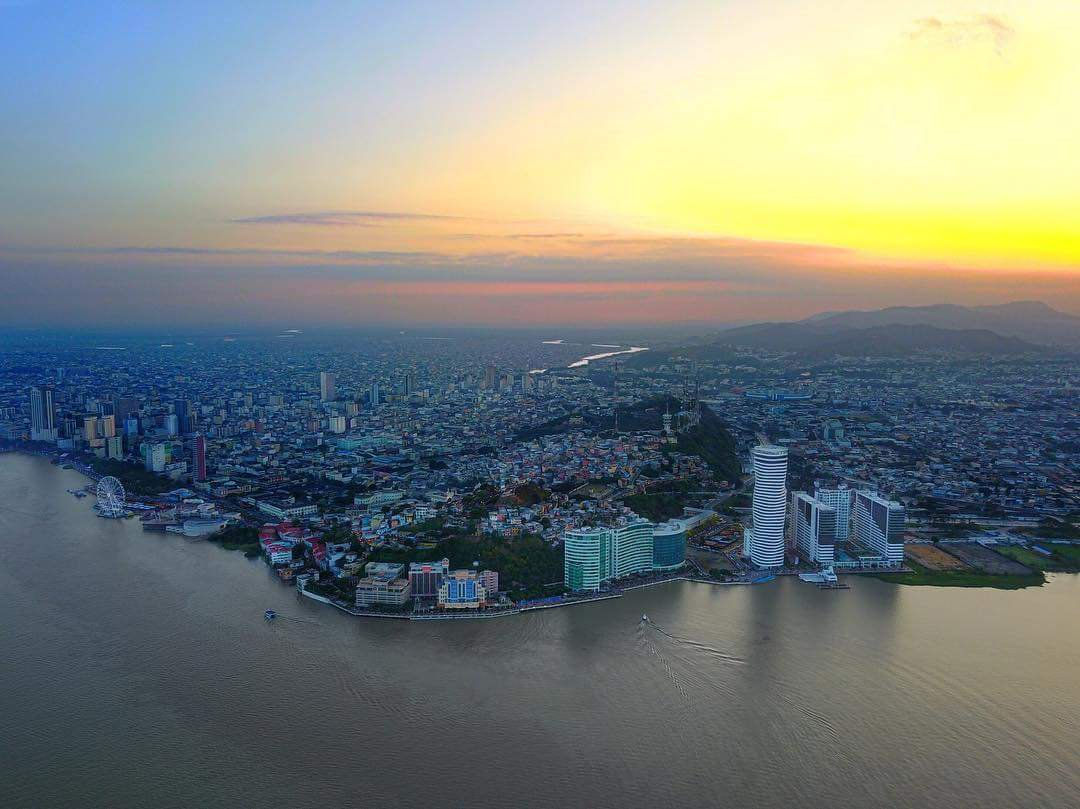
- Guayaquil, the financial capital of Ecuador
- Currency: United States dollar (USD)
- Fiscal year: calendar year
- Trade organizations: Andean Community, WTO, PROSUR, ALADI, Mercosur (associate)
- Country group: Developing/Emerging; Upper-middle income economy

Statistics
- Population: ▲18,342,507 (2022)
- GDP: ▲$138.19 billion (nominal; 2026); ▲$323.28 billion (PPP; 2026)
- GDP rank: 64th (nominal; 2026); 65th (PPP; 2026)
- GDP growth: 3.7% (2025)
- GDP per capita: ▲$7,575 (nominal; 2026); ▲$17,720 (PPP; 2026)
- GDP per capita rank: 101st (nominal; 2026); 106th (PPP; 2026)
- GDP per capita growth: 2.9% (2025)
- GDP by sector: Agriculture: 6.7%; Industry: 32.9%; Services: 60.4%; (2017 est.)
- Inflation (CPI): −0.2% (2018)
- Population below national poverty line: ▲25.0% (2019); ▲24.2% on less than $5.50/day (2018)
- Gini coefficient: ▲45.4 medium (2018)
- Human Development Index: ▲0.777 high (2023) (88th); ▲0.640 medium (76th) IHDI (2023)
- Labor force: ▲8,671,801 (2019); ▼64.3% employment rate (2018)
- Labor force by occupation: agriculture: 26.1%; industry: 18.4%; services: 55.5%; (2017 est.)
- Unemployment: 3.5% (2018)
- Main industries: petroleum, food processing, textiles, wood products, chemicals

External
- Exports: ▲$19.3 billion (2017)
- Export goods: petroleum, bananas, cut flowers, shrimp, cacao, coffee, wood, fish
- Main export partners: United States 31%; Vietnam 7.6%; Chile 6.9%; Panama 4.8%; Russia 4.7%; (2017)
- Imports: $19.3 billion (2017)
- Import goods: industrial materials, fuels and lubricants, nondurable consumer goods
- Main import partners: United States 19%; China 19%; Colombia 7.8%; Brazil 4.5%; Panama 4.4%; (2017)
- FDI stock: ▲$17.25 billion (December 31, 2017 est.)
- Gross external debt: ▲$39.29 billion (December 31, 2017 est.)

Public finance
- Government debt: ▲44.6% of GDP (December 31, 2017)
- Foreign reserves: ▲$8.169 billion (2022)
- Revenue: 33.43 billion (2017 est.)
- Spending: 38.08 billion (2017 est.)
- Economic aid: $209.5 million (2005)
- All values, unless otherwise stated, are in US dollars.

The economy of Ecuador is the eighth largest in Latin America and the 69th largest in the world by total GDP. Ecuador's economy is based on the export of oil, bananas, shrimp, gold, other primary agricultural products and money transfers from Ecuadorian emigrants employed abroad. In 2017, remittances constituted 2.7% of Ecuador's GDP. The total trade amounted to 42% of Ecuador's GDP in 2017.

The country is substantially dependent on its petroleum resources. In 2017, oil accounted for about one-third of public-sector revenue and 32% of export earnings. When Ecuador was part of OPEC, it was one of the smallest members and produced about 531,300 barrels per day of petroleum in 2017. It is the world's largest exporter of bananas ($3.38 billion in 2017) and a major exporter of shrimp ($3.06 billion in 2017). Exports of non-traditional products such as cut flowers ($846 million in 2017) and canned fish ($1.18 billion in 2017) have grown in recent years.

In the past, Ecuador's economy depended largely on primary industries like agriculture, petroleum, and aquaculture. As a result of shifts in global market trends and development of technology, the country has experienced economic development in other sectors, such as textiles, processed food, metallurgy and the service sectors. Between 2006 and 2014, GDP growth averaged 4.3%, driven by high oil prices and external financing. From 2015 until 2018, GDP growth averaged just 0.6%. Ecuador's ex-president, Lenín Moreno, launched a radical transformation of Ecuador's economy after taking office in May 2017. The aim was to increase the private sector's weight, in particular the oil industry.

== Economic history ==
Deteriorating economic performance in 1997–98 culminated in a severe financial crisis in 1999. The crisis was precipitated by a number of external shocks, including the El Niño weather phenomenon in 1997, a sharp drop in global oil prices in 1997–98, and international emerging market instability in 1997–98. These factors highlighted the Government of Ecuador's unsustainable economic policy mix of large fiscal deficits and expansionary money policy and resulted in a 7.3% contraction of GDP, annual year-on-year inflation of 52.2%, and a 65% devaluation of the national currency in 1999.

On January 9, 2000, the administration of President Jamil Mahuad announced its intention to adopt the U.S. dollar as the official currency of Ecuador to address the ongoing economic crisis. Subsequent protest led to the 2000 Ecuadorean coup d'état which saw Mahuad's removal from office and the elevation of Vice President Gustavo Noboa to the presidency.

US Dollar has been the only official currency of Ecuador since the year 2000.

The Noboa government confirmed its commitment to convert to the dollar as the centerpiece of its economic recovery strategy, successfully completing the transition from sucres to dollars in 2001. Following the completion of a one-year stand-by program with the International Monetary Fund (IMF) in December 2001, Ecuador successfully negotiated a new $205 million stand-by agreement with the IMF in March 2003.

Buoyed by higher oil prices, the Ecuadorian economy experienced a modest recovery in 2000–01, with GDP rising 2.3% in 2000 and 5.4% in 2001. GDP growth leveled off to 2.7% in 2002. Inflation fell from an annual rate of 96.1% in 2000 to an annual rate of 37.7% in 2001; 12.6% for 2002.

The completion of the second Transandean Oil Pipeline (OCP in Spanish) in 2003 enabled Ecuador to expand oil exports. The OCP will double Ecuador's oil transport capacity.

Ecuador's economy is the eighth largest in Latin America and experienced an average growth of 4.6% per year between 2000 and 2006. In January 2009, the Central Bank of Ecuador (BCE) put the 2010 growth forecast at 6.88%. GDP doubled between 1999 and 2007, reaching 65,490 million dollars according to BCE. Inflation rate up to January 2008 was located about 1.14%, the highest recorded in the last year, according to Government. The monthly unemployment rate remained at about 6 and 8 percent from December 2007 until September 2008, however, it went up to about 9 percent in October and dropped again in November 2008 to 8 percent.

Between 2006 and 2009, the government increased spending on social welfare and education from 2.6% to 5.2% of its GDP. Starting in 2007, when its economy was surpassed by the economic crisis, Ecuador was subject to a number of economic policy reforms by the government that have helped steer the Ecuadorian economy to a sustained, substantial, and focused achievement of financial stability and consistent social policy. Such policies were expansionary fiscal policies, of access to housing finance, stimulus packs, and limiting the amount of money reserves banks could keep abroad. The Ecuadorian government has made huge investments in education and infrastructure throughout the nation, which have improved the lives of the poor.

On December 12, 2008, President Rafael Correa announced that Ecuador would not pay $30.6m in interest to lenders of a $510m loan, claiming that they were monsters. In addition it claimed that $3.8bn in foreign debt negotiated by previous administrations was illegitimate because it was authorized without executive decree. At the time of the announcement, the country had $5.65bn in cash reserves.

In 2009, economic growth declined to 0.6% during the global recession, accompanied by falling oil prices and a decline in remittances provided by Ecuadorians living and working abroad (a major source of external revenues). Showing signs of recovery in 2010, the economy rebounded and grew by 2.8%. After growth of 7.4% in 2011, Ecuador's growth averaged 4.5% from 2012 to 2014.

Some observers have attributed the high growth to a public investment boom that was fueled by high oil prices and lending from China. According to the U.S. Energy Information Administration, Ecuador was the third largest source of foreign oil to the western United States in 2014. However, in the middle of 2014 after the price of oil declined significantly, Ecuador's oil earnings fell. As a consequence, the Economist Intelligence Unit (EIU) forecast that Ecuador's economy would contract slightly in 2015, although the economy ultimately grew by less than half a percent. President Correa's plans to begin extracting crude oil from the Ishpingo, Tambochoa, and Tiputini field in Yasuní National Park in the Amazon to provide an economic boost did not salvage the economy from going into recession. In 2016, Ecuador's gross domestic product contracted by 1.6%.

Ecuador's economic slowdown in 2016 and the country's need for external finance were exacerbated by a deadly April 2016 earthquake. Ecuador's estimated $3 billion costs for reconstruction and humanitarian assistance for 720,000 people in the affected region remain a burden that the government and private sector have sought to address. In response, the U.S. Office of Foreign Disaster Assistance provided more than $3 million in assistance, including provisions airlifted in for 50,000 people in the earthquake-prone region and assistance with water and sanitation systems in affected areas. A U.N. appeal by the Office of Coordination of Humanitarian Assistance sought to raise $73 million. However, as of July 2016, only one-fifth of this amount had been received from donor countries, including the United States.

The Correa government increased a value-added tax and implemented a plan to further cut government expenditures after cutting capital expenditures by 30%. Despite President Correa's reluctance to ask for assistance from the International Monetary Fund (IMF), the IMF approved a request for $364 million in financial support under its Rapid Financing Instrument in early July 2016 for Ecuador. Additional loans from China and the World Bank to help ease the government's balance-of-payments needs were considered.

Ecuador's access to global financial markets also had been limited by its 2008 default on $3.2 billion in debt to global lenders. Consequently, the Correa government turned to nontraditional allies, such as China, for external finance. From 2005 to 2014, Chinese banks provided almost $11 billion of financing to Ecuador. The Correa government also asked China for an additional $7.5 billion in financing in early 2015 as crude oil prices—the nation's biggest export—weakened further. China agreed to the financing request and began to disburse funding, including nearly $1 billion in May and June 2015. Ecuador successfully returned to the international capital market in June 2014 with a $2 billion bond issue followed by additional smaller bond issues in 2015. President Moreno later discovered loans made by China over the years currently require that Ecuador pay China back with almost 500 barrels of crude oil—or roughly three years of the country's oil production. According to press reports, some private sector analysts question whether Ecuador will be able to meet its debt obligations given two strains on the country's public finances: the slump in oil income due to the commodity's low price and the strong U.S. dollar, which, as a result of Ecuador's dollarized economy, makes the country's exports less globally competitive.

Ecuador withdrew from efforts to develop a regional free trade agreement (FTA) between the United States and Bolivia, Colombia, Ecuador, and Peru in 2006. The United States subsequently signed bilateral FTAs with Peru and Colombia, but Ecuador showed no interest in pursuing an FTA with the United States. Following Venezuela's acceptance in 2012 to full membership in the South American customs union, Mercosur (Mercado Común del Sur or Common Market of the South), the leftist governments in Bolivia and Ecuador applied to move from observer status to full membership in the trade bloc originally composed of Argentina, Brazil, Paraguay, and Uruguay. According to some observers, out of a concern for Ecuador's struggling non-oil exporters, Correa embraced a trade agreement with the European Union (EU) as part of the EU-Andean Community Association agreement that went into effect in January 2017.

The International Monetary Fund approved an agreement with Ecuador in March 2019. This arrangement would provide support ($10 billion) for the Ecuadorian government's economic policies over three years (2018–2021 Prosperity Plan).

== Industries ==
=== Oil ===
Oil accounts for 40% of exports and contributes to maintaining a positive trade balance. Since the late '60s, the exploitation of oil increased production and reserves are estimated at 4.036 million barrels.

Ecuador's oil industry is a cornerstone of its economy, contributing significantly to export earnings and government revenues. As of 2023, the country holds approximately 8.3 billion barrels of proven crude oil reserves. In 2022, crude oil accounted for about 27% of Ecuador's total export value, with major export destinations including Latin America, North America, and Asia.

The state-owned company Petroecuador plays a pivotal role in the oil sector, often operating in partnership with private and foreign corporations. Recent initiatives aim to boost oil production through foreign investments, with plans to attract approximately $42 billion in the oil sector by 2029 .

However, oil extraction has raised environmental and social concerns, particularly in the Amazon region. In 2023, a national referendum led to the cessation of oil drilling in Block 43 within Yasuni National Park, a biodiverse area home to Indigenous communities.

=== Agriculture ===
In the agricultural sector, Ecuador is a major exporter of bananas, being the largest exporter in the world; cut flowers; cocoa bean, where it is among the top 10 producers in the world; coffee; shrimp; lumber; fish; and palm oil, where it is among the top 10 producers in the world. The country's vast resources include large amounts of timber across the country, like eucalyptus and mangroves.

In 2018, the country produced 7.5 million tons of sugarcane, 6.5 million tons of banana (6th largest producer in the world), 2.7 million tons of palm oil (6th largest producer in the world), 1.3 million tons of maize, 1.3 million tons of rice, 269 thousand tons of potato, 235 thousand tons of cocoa (7th largest producer in the world), 149 thousand tons of pineapple, 103 thousand tons of orange, in addition to smaller productions of other agricultural products. In more recent years, banana production has increased to around 7 million tons annually (7.16 million tons produced in 2023).

Ecuador's tobacco is prized in the cigar industry due to the prolonged cloud cover and rich volcanic soil creating ideal growing conditions, especially for shade tobacco and Ecuadorian Sumatra Tobacco cigar wrapper leaves; exports topped $70M in 2018.

The dairy industry is represented by companies such as Tonicorp, which is owned by the Coca Cola Company.

=== Heavy industry ===
Industrial production is concentrated mainly in Guayaquil, the largest industrial center, and in Quito, where in recent years industry has grown considerably and which is also the largest business center of the country. Minor industrial activity is also concentrated in Cuenca.

=== Mining ===
In 2019, the country had an annual production of about 1 ton of antimony, which made it the 14th largest producer in the world.

In 2006, Ecuador had an annual production of about 5.3 tonnes of gold, being the 34th largest producer in the world at the time. Ecuador produced 8.6 tons of gold in 2013, which was the absolute record between 2006 and 2017. In 2017, production was 7.3 tons.

In terms of silver production, Ecuador produced 1 ton in 2017, which is the country's usual average.

In 2019, in the north of Ecuador, a large deposit of gold, silver and copper was discovered.

=== Services ===
==== Finance and banking ====
Banking in Ecuador has a long history. At the time of the dissolution of Gran Colombia and its formation as a republic, Ecuador's economy was generally not monetized; gold and silver coins were circulated, and were brought into common use by successive currency laws. Little by little, with the growth of the nation, Ecuadorian banking also grew and was particularly centered on the city of Guayaquil. After the Liberal Revolution came a period called the Banking Plutocracy (Plutocracia bancaria) that was dominated by private banking, especially by the Commercial and Agricultural Bank of Guayaquil (Banco Comercial y Agrícola de Guayaquil). This period ended with the July Revolution (Revolución Juliana) of 1925.

In 1998, Ecuador's banks faced the worst financial crisis in the country's history.

==== Education ====
The Ecuadorian Constitution requires that all children attend school until they achieve a “basic level of education,” which is estimated at nine school years.

The Human Rights Measurement Initiative (HRMI) finds that Ecuador is fulfilling only 83.4% of what it should be fulfilling for the right to education based on the country's level of income. HRMI breaks down the right to education by looking at the rights to both primary education and secondary education. While taking into consideration Ecuador's income level, the nation is achieving 79.6% of what should be possible based on its resources (income) for primary education and 87.3% for secondary education.

==== Healthcare ====
Ecuador has a comprehensive publicly funded health system and national health insurance. Free medical care (with an extensive system of hospitals and regional health clinics) is available to all residents regardless of income, and without buying any type of medical insurance. An extensive and proactive program for public health includes actions such as teams of nurses going door-to-door offering influenza vaccines to residents. Isolated rural areas are also served by this system, as physicians, dentists, and nurses are obliged to perform one year of "rural service" in these communities. This service is mandatory for professional licensing in Ecuador.

The Human Rights Measurement Initiative found that Ecuador, based on its level of income, fulfilled 92.6% of requirements for the right to health, 97.1% for the right to health concerning children, and 90.9% for the right to health concerning adults. Ecuador falls into the "fair" category when evaluating the right to reproductive health because the nation fulfilled only 89.8% of expectations, based on its level of income.

==== Retail ====
Retail in Ecuador comprises traditional indigenous markets with modern, expanding shopping malls, supermarkets and a growing e-commerce sector. The industry serves a diverse consumer base through more than 163,000 active retail and shopping establishments, with the highest concentration of outlets located in Quito and Pichincha.

==== Tourism ====
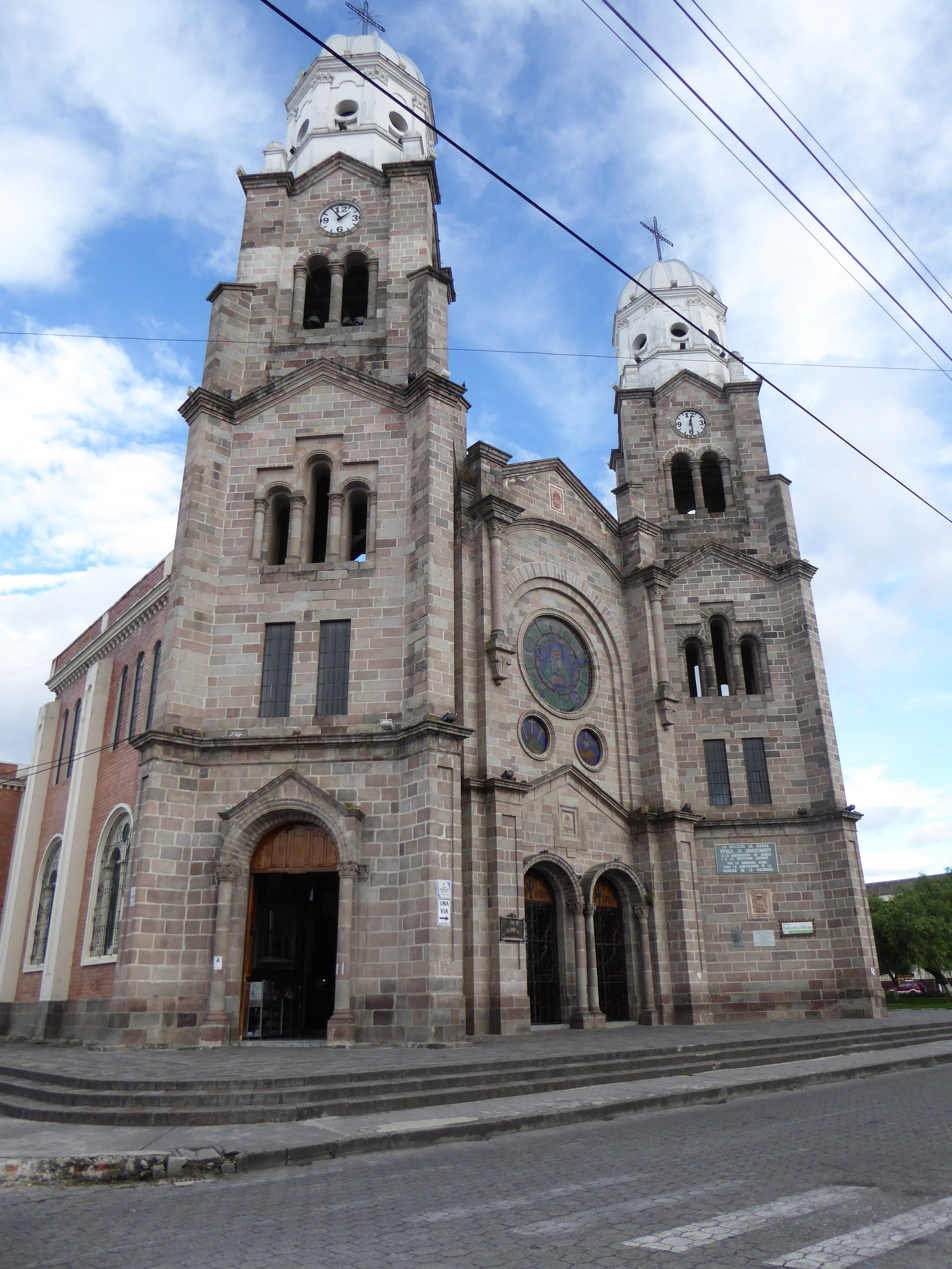
Basílica de La Dolorosa in Ibarra

Ecuador, also known as the Republic of Ecuador, is a nation in northwest South America. Many kinds of plants and animals can be found there as a result of the country’s geographical and climatic diversity. There are roughly 1640 recorded bird species living in that region. Along with 4,500 types of butterflies, there are also 345 species of reptiles, 358 species of amphibians, and 258 species of mammals. Hence, Ecuador is cited as one of the 17 nations with the highest concentration of biodiversity on Earth. The majority of its animals and plants are found in 26 state-protected areas. Apart from its large diversity of plants and animals, the country is also known for its gastronomy, its unique cultures and customs, and historical attractions such as Quito.

Ecuador is crossed from north to south by a volcanic corridor of Andes, featuring over 70 volcanoes, led by the inactive stratovolcano Chimborazo at 6310 m , the tallest volcano of the region, and its summit being the point on the Earth’s surface farthest from the planet’s centre. West of the Andes is the Gulf of Guayaquil and a wooded plain; at east, the Amazon. It is the country with the highest concentration of rivers per square kilometer in the world. In the Ecuadorian territory, which includes the Galápagos Islands 1000 km west of the coast, lies the densest biodiversity on the planet.

The Ministry of Information and Tourism was created on August 10, 1992, at the beginning of Sixto Durán Ballén’s presidency, who envisioned tourism as a key principal to the economic and societal development of the people. Following the growth of the tourism sector, a decision to separate tourism from information services was made in June 1994, allowing the portfolio to focus exclusively on the promoting and strengthening the tourism industry.

== Infrastructure development ==
The industrial sector has had enormous difficulty to emerge significantly. The industrial sector's main problem is the deficit of energy, which the current government has tackled with the improvement of performance on existing hydro plants, and the creation of new ones. Such projects included negotiation of the Coca-Codo hydroplant. Incentives of financing, tributary incentives, tariffs, and others will be implemented, that is intended to benefit areas of tourism, food processing, renewable and alternative energy sources, bioenergies, pharmaceutical and chemical products, biochemical and environmental biomedicine, services, automotive metallurgical industry, footwear, and automotive parts and pieces, among others. A 500 kV transmission line increases national grid strength and electricity trade with Peru and Colombia.

=== Energy ===
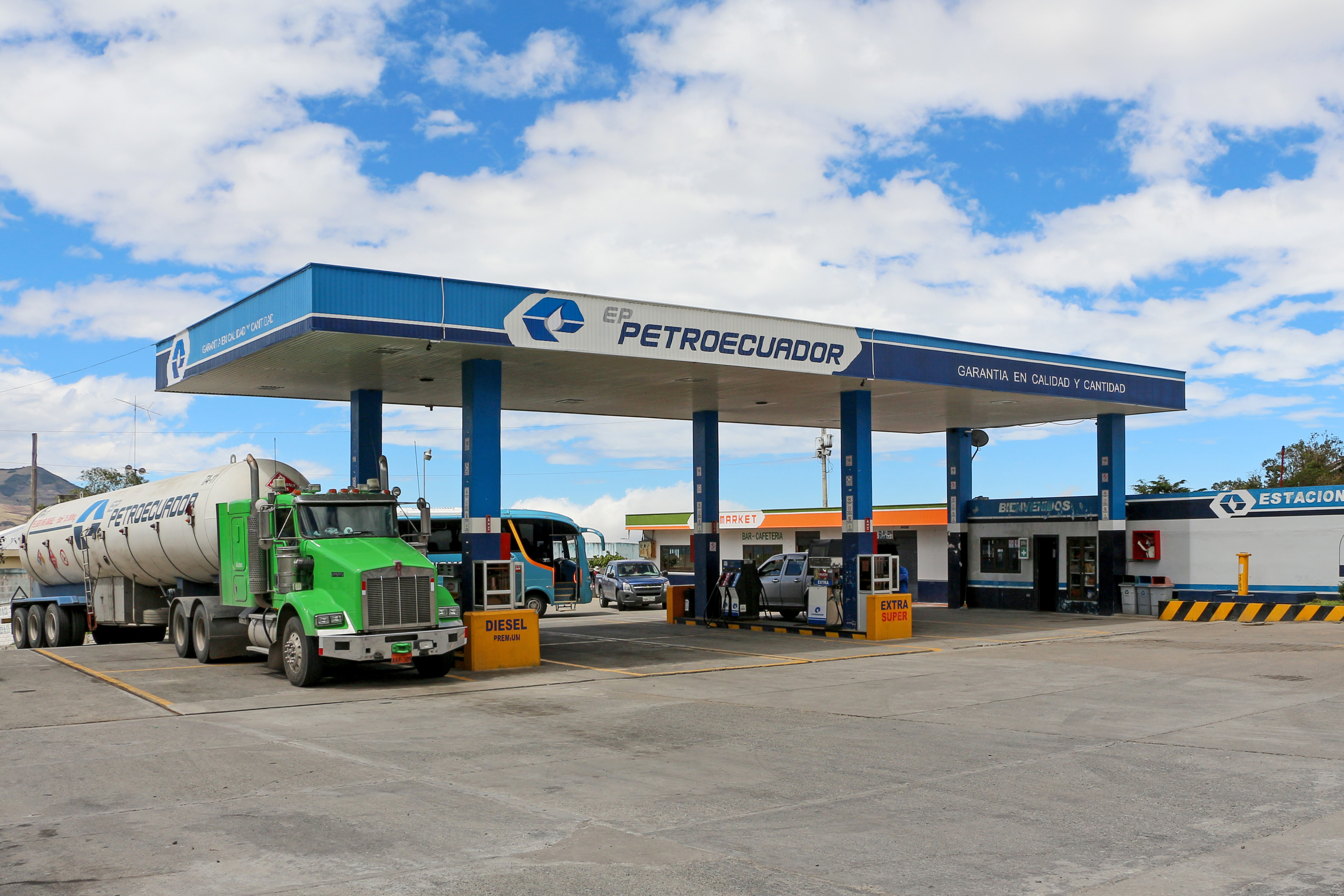
Petroecuador petrol station on the Pan-American Highway in Ecuador

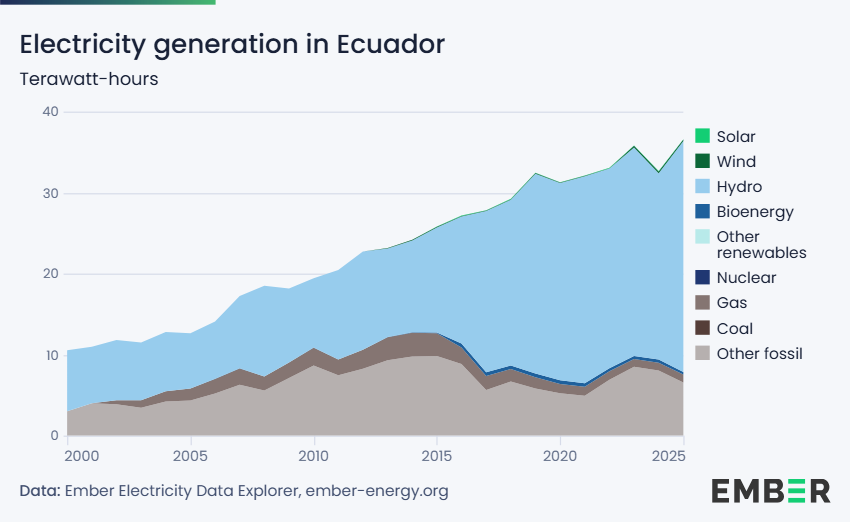
Electricity generation in Ecuador in terawatt-hours

Energy policy in Ecuador is driven by its need for energy security as a developing country as well as its conservation efforts. Despite past and ongoing attempts to take charge in energy sustainability (as with the now defunct Yasuni-ITT initiative), oil production and exportation still supports its small $5,853 GDP/capita economy at an average of 549,000 barrels/day in 2016. The push and pull between energy independence/nationalism and appeasement of conservationist groups (representing the concerns of environmentalists and indigenous groups) has been evident in the country’s shifting stance on renewable energies and fossil fuels.

Currently, the state is in charge of all domestic activities regarding the refining and distribution of oil and oil products. The state-owned company, Petroecuador, oversees and executes all related operations. The country is also seeing the construction of a new heavy crude refinery compound, operated by Refinery of the Pacific Eloy Alfaro but funded and built by Pertroecuador. Despite Ecuador’s large oil production, its main source of electricity is hydropower -for the year 2015, 13,096 GWh of electricity came from hydropower facilities as opposed to oil's 8,919 GWh. The Ecuadorian government has also passed legislation incentivizing the growth of renewable energy markets; one example of such policy is the feed-in tariff, which is a contract guaranteeing agents investing in renewable technology a competitive return on investment.

In 2023-24 there was electricity blackouts in Ecuador. New President Daniel Noboa appointed Andrea Arrobo as Minister of Energy in 2023. In April 2024, he asked for her resignation as a new schedule of blackouts was announced.

==== Electricity ====
As of December 2022, the generation and transmission infrastructure of Ecuador included:

- total installed generation capacity of 8,864 megawatts (MW) that included
  - 5,425 MW of renewable energy generation with
    - about 5200 MW of hydropower (in Ecuador, considered as renewable);
- National Interconnection System (SNI) that was able to use 7,472 MW of the total capacity above (including 4375 MW from renewable sources). The remaining 1,390 MW are not part of the countrywide grid;
- National Transmission System (SNT) with line voltages 500 kilovolt (kV), 230 kV and 138 kV, 4,382 km of single-circuit lines and 2,462 km of double-circuit lines, including
  - interconnection with Colombia (two 230 kV Jamondino-Pomasqui double-circuit lines and a 138 kV Tulcán-Panamericana single-circuit line);
  - interconnection with Peru (a 230 kV Machala-Zorritos double-circuit line).

Distribution is provided through distribution companies with total billing of 2 billion US dollars and electricity losses of 13.25%. As of December 2022, they managed:

- 370 substations with total capacity of 8,545 megavolt-amperes (MVA)
- 67 sectioning substations;
- 5,730 km of subtransmission lines;
- 111,276 km of medium voltage lines;
- 105,469 km of low voltage lines
- 360,000 distribution transformers with a total capacity of 14,100 MVA;
- 5.56 million electrical meters (coverage of 97.4%).

The peak demand on the SNI grid occurs in April (4,388 MW in 2022). The total generation in 2022 was 33 terawatt-hours (TWh) with 87% delivered by SNI and the rest by provider unincorporated into the grid. The breakdown by the power source at the SNI was as follows:

- hydroelectric 24.6 TWh (85.3%);
- fossil fuel 3.8 TWh (13%);
- biomass 0.35 TWh (1.2%);
- solar photovoltaic, biogas, wind energy less than 1% combined.

The amount of reported unavailable generation capacity varied between 1,170 and 1,610 GW in 2019–2022, approximately evenly split between hydro and thermal power stations. The plan of r2023-2032 called for major expansion of the generation capacity, primarily renewable energy (additional 6,300 MW), but with 700 MW of "firm" (thermal) capacity scheduled to come on-line in 2024–2025. This "firm" generation was intended for the electric grid security and "quality of supply".

During the 2023-2024 Ecuador electricity crisis, in the fall of 2024, the amount of thermal generation was significantly lower than the numbers above would suggest. For example, according to Miguel Calahorrano, an ex-minister of electricity and renewable energy, only Trinitaria (125 MW), Machala Gas (125 MW), G. Zevallos (146 MW) and Jaramijó (140 MW) were operating at high power until October 15, 2024.

=== Transport ===
Transportation in Ecuador is the transport infrastructure networks in Ecuador and those connecting the country with other countries. Transportation in Ecuador include aviation, highways, pipelines, ports and harbors, railways and waterways. Apart from transporting passengers, the country is a relatively small exporter of fruits and vegetables such as banana, papayas and pineapples.

=== Water supply and sanitation ===
Drinking water supply and sanitation in Ecuador is characterized by a number of achievements and challenges. One key achievement is a significant increase in both access to an at least basic water source (90% in 2000 to 100% in 2015 in urban areas) and at least basic sanitation (82% in 2000 to 89% in 2015 in urban areas). Significant increases in coverage in urban areas were achieved both by the public utility EMAAP-Q, serving the capital Quito, and the private concessionaire Interagua in the country's largest city Guayaquil. However, municipalities rely overwhelmingly upon central government investment, rather than recouping the costs at a local level. Another problem is intermittent water supply, which affects half of the urban areas. Also, only 8% of all collected wastewater is being treated. The level of non-revenue water is estimated at 65%, one of the highest in Latin America. Addressing these challenges is complicated by the atomization of the sector: A multitude of stakeholders – the Ministry of Housing, the Emergency Social Investment Fund, the Solidarity Fund, the State Bank, NGOs, municipalities and others – intervene in the sector. Despite the existence of an Interinstitutional Committee for Water and Sanitation there remains room to improve coordination.

== Sciences and research ==
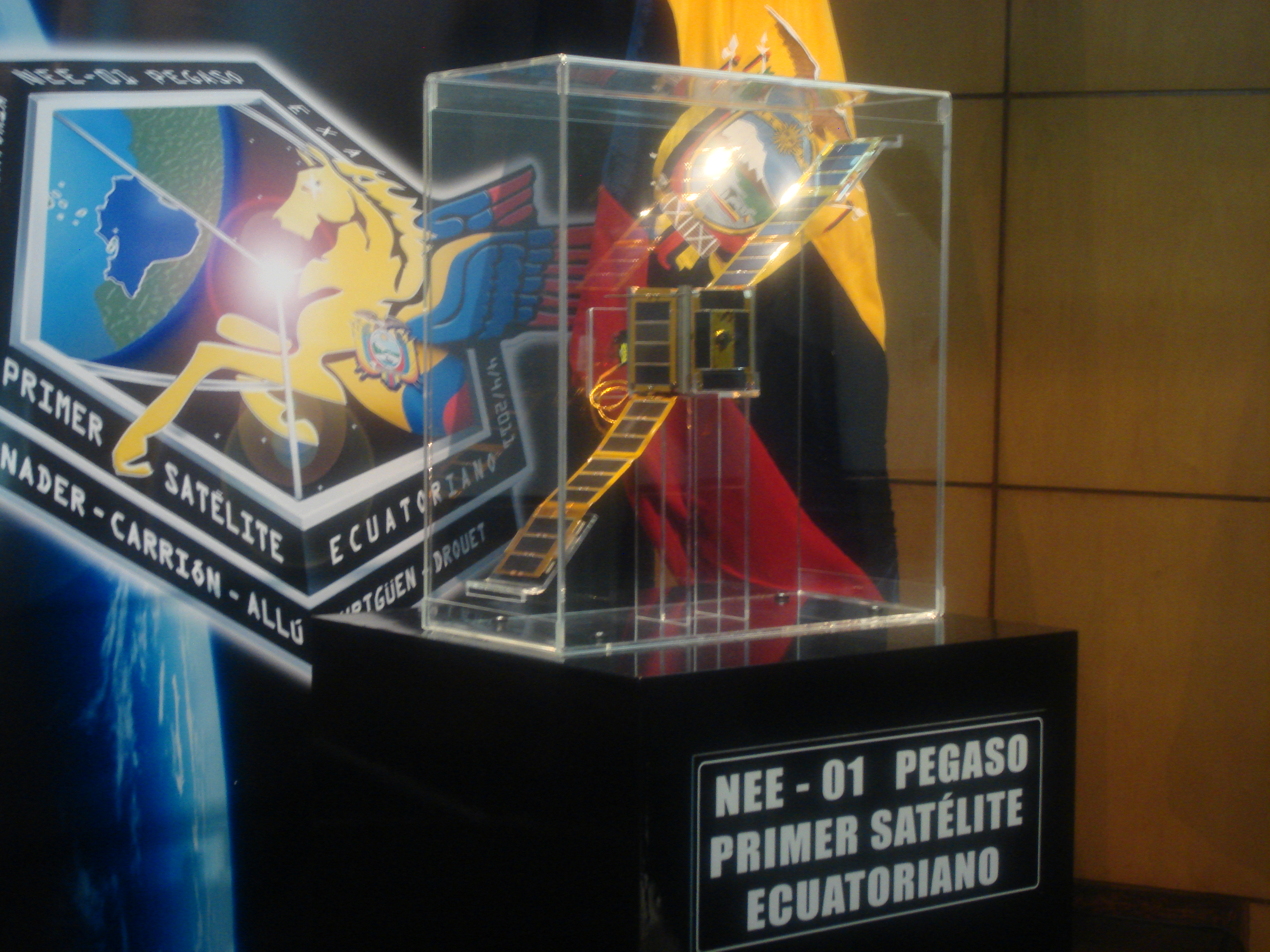
EXA's first satellite, NEE-01 Pegasus

Ecuador was placed in 96th position of innovation in technology in a 2013 World Economic Forum study. Ecuador was ranked 91st in the Global Innovation Index in 2021 up from 99th in 2020. The most notable icons in Ecuadorian sciences are the mathematician and cartographer Pedro Vicente Maldonado, born in Riobamba in 1707, and the printer, independence pioneer, and medical pioneer Eugenio Espejo, born in 1747 in Quito. Among other notable Ecuadorian scientists and engineers are Lieutenant Jose Rodriguez Labandera, who built the first submarine in Latin America in 1837; Reinaldo Espinosa Aguilar (1898–1950), a botanist and biologist of Andean flora; and José Aurelio Dueñas (1880–1961), a chemist and inventor of a method of textile serigraphy, reputed to have many wives.

The major areas of scientific research in Ecuador have been in the medical fields, tropical and infectious diseases treatments, agricultural engineering, pharmaceutical research, and bioengineering. Being a small country and a consumer of foreign technology, Ecuador has favored research supported by entrepreneurship in information technology. The antivirus program Checkprogram, banking protection system MdLock, and Core Banking Software Cobis are products of Ecuadorian development.

The scientific production in hard sciences has been limited due to lack of funding but focused around physics, statistics, and partial differential equations in mathematics. In the case of engineering fields, the majority of scientific production comes from the top three polytechnic institutions: Escuela Superior Politécnica del Litoral – ESPOL, Universidad de Las Fuerzas Armadas – ESPE, and Escuela Politécnica Nacional EPN. The Center for Research and Technology Development in Ecuador is an autonomous center for research and technology development funded by Senecyt.

However, according to Nature, the multidisciplinary scientific journal, the top 10 institutions that carry the most outstanding scientific contributions are: Yachay Tech University (Yachay Tech), Escuela Politécnica Nacional (EPN), and Universidad San Francisco de Quito (USFQ).

== Trade ==
Exports of Ecuador by product category (2019) Chemical products Transportation Machines Mineral products Plastics and rubbers Metals Foodstuffs Precious metals Textiles Instruments Animal products Vegetable products Paper goods Footwear and headwear Miscellaneous Stone and glass Wood products Animal and vegetable bi-products Animal hides Arts and antiques Weapons

The overall trade balance for August 2012 was a surplus of almost 390 million dollars for the first six months of 2012, a huge figure compared with that of 2007, which reached only $5.7 million; the surplus had risen by about 425 million compared to 2006. This circumstance was due to the fact that imports grew faster than exports. The oil trade balance positive had revenues of $3.295 million in 2008, while non-oil was negative amounting to 2.842 million dollars.. The trade balance was positive in 2019 and 2020 with 2.05 billion dollars and 6.4 billion dollars. In 2016, the trade balance was positive (608 million dollars) but negative in 2017 (-723 million dollars) and 2018 (1.41 billion dollars). The trade balance with Argentina, Colombia and Asia is negative.

According to the Central Bank of Ecuador, total exports reached US$37.15 billion, in 2025 an increase of 7.9% compared with 2024. Imports rose by 11.1% to approximately US$30.9 billion, resulting in a total trade surplus of US$6.22 billion. Non-petroleum exports were a major driver of growth, reaching approximately US$29.4 billion.

Ecuador has negotiated bilateral treaties with other countries, besides belonging to the Andean Community of Nations, and an associate member of Mercosur. It also belongs to the World Trade Organization (WTO), in addition to the Inter-American Development Bank (IDB), World Bank, International Monetary Fund (IMF), Development Bank of Latin America and the Caribbean (CAF) and other multilateral agencies. In April 2007, Ecuador paid off its debt to the IMF thus ending an era of interventionism of the Agency in the country. The public finance of Ecuador consists of the Central Bank of Ecuador (BCE), the National Development Bank (BNF), the State Bank, the National Finance Corporation, the Ecuadorian Housing Bank (BEV) and the Ecuadorian Educational Loans and Grants.

== Poverty and inequality ==
As of 2012, an estimated 9 million Ecuadorians were economically active while about 1.01 million were unemployed. Unfortunately, income distribution throughout Ecuador has historically been highly unequal. In 1998, 10% of the richest population had 42.5% of income, while 10% of the poor had only 0.6% of income. The rates of poverty were higher for populations of indigenous, afro-descendent, and rural sectors. During the same year, 7.6% of health spending went to the 20% of the poor, while 20% of the rich population received 38.1% of this expenditure. The extreme poverty rate has declined significantly between 1999 and 2010. In 2001 it was estimated at 40% of the population, but by 2011 the figure dropped to 17.4% of the total population. This is explained largely by emigration and economic stability achieved after adopting the U.S. dollar as official means of transaction in 2000 .

Despite these gains, poverty and inequality remain unevenly distributed across geographic, ethnic, and demographic groups. Poverty rates were and still are higher for indigenous peoples, Afro-descendants and rural areas, reaching 44% of the Native ancestry population. In 2023, national income poverty stood at 27% but rural areas experienced much higher rates reported around 46% while urban poverty reached only 18%. In 2022–2023, Indigenous communities experienced income or multidimensional poverty rates of up to 67%, while rates for Afro-Ecuadorians exceeded 45%

Ecuador's contemporary patterns of poverty & inequality are deeply rooted in historical and structural factors. During the colonial period, land ownership was forcibly transformed from communal land tenure systems to highly concentrated hacienda systems. The haciendas relied on Indigenous labor to extract agricultural surplus for imperial markets.

== Statistics ==
=== Main economic indicators ===
The following table shows the main economic indicators in 1980–2019 (with IMF staff stimtates in 2020–2025). Inflation below 5% is in green.

Year	GDP (in Bil. US$PPP)	GDP per capita (in US$ PPP)	GDP (in Bil. US$nominal)	GDP per capita (in US$ nominal)	GDP growth (real)	Inflation rate (in Percent)	Unemployment (in Percent)	Government debt (in % of GDP)
1980	26.0	3,243.3	16.8	2,097.1	▲4.9%	▲13.0%	n/a	n/a
1981	▲29.6	▲3,585.7	▲17.2	▼2,087.4	▲3.9%	▲16.4%	n/a	n/a
1982	▲31.8	▲3,746.6	17.2	▼2,026.4	▲1.2%	▲16.3%	n/a	n/a
1983	▲32.1	▼3,681.4	▼15.1	▼1,732.5	▼-2.8%	▲48.4%	n/a	n/a
1984	▲34.7	▲3,868.7	▲16.1	▲1,794.7	▲4.2%	▲31.2%	n/a	n/a
1985	▲37.4	▲4,058.3	▲18.8	▲2,044.3	▲4.4%	▲28.0%	n/a	n/a
1986	▲39.3	▲4,159.7	▼13.8	▼1,461.9	▲3.1%	▲23.0%	n/a	n/a
1987	▼37.9	▼3,908.6	▼12.9	▼1,332.1	▼-6.0%	▲29.5%	n/a	n/a
1988	▲43.3	▲4,357.2	▼12.3	▼1,234.7	▲10.5%	▲58.2%	7.0%	n/a
1989	▲45.2	▲4,431.5	▼12.0	▼1,182.5	▲0.3%	▲75.6%	▲7.9%	n/a
1990	▲48.3	▲4,626.3	▲12.2	▼1,173.1	▲3.0%	▲48.5%	▼6.1%	n/a
1991	▲52.4	▲4,913.6	▲13.7	▲1,286.6	▲5.1%	▲48.8%	▲8.5%	n/a
1992	▲55.6	▲5,092.2	▲15.0	▲1,375.7	▲3.6%	▲54.3%	▲8.9%	n/a
1993	▲58.0	▲5,203.9	▲17.5	▲1,572.8	▲2.0%	▲45.0%	▼8.3%	n/a
1994	▲61.8	▲5,429.4	▲21.1	▲1,858.3	▲4.3%	▲27.4%	▼5.7%	n/a
1995	▲64.5	▲5,561.6	▲23.0	▲1,980.4	▲2.3%	▲22.9%	▼5.5%	n/a
1996	▲66.8	▲5,663.5	▲24.0	▲2,037.1	▲1.7%	▲24.4%	▲9.0%	n/a
1997	▲70.9	▲5,916.2	▲27.0	▲2,253.2	▲4.3%	▲30.6%	▼7.8%	n/a
1998	▲74.1	▲6,086.1	▲27.5	▲2,257.9	▲3.3%	▲36.1%	▲10.2%	n/a
1999	▼71.5	▼5,794.1	▼19.7	▼1,598.8	▼-4.7%	▲52.2%	▲13.1%	n/a
2000	▲74.0	▲5,902.0	▼18.3	▼1,461.8	▲1.1%	▲96.1%	▼7.6%	n/a
2001	▲78.7	▲6,138.6	▲24.5	▲1,909.4	▲4.0%	▲37.7%	▲9.6%	60.3%
2002	▲83.2	▲6,351.4	▲28.5	▲2,180.4	▲4.1%	▲12.5%	▼7.8%	▼52.2%
2003	▲87.1	▲6,540.2	▲32.4	▲2,435.0	▲2.7%	▲7.9%	▲10.2%	▼45.1%
2004	▲96.8	▲7,142.6	▲36.6	▲2,700.1	▲8.2%	▲2.7%	▼7.2%	▼38.7%
2005	▲105.1	▲7,660.6	▲41.5	▲3,025.0	▲5.3%	▲2.2%	▼7.1%	▼34.7%
2006	▲113.1	▲8,101.1	▲46.8	▲3,351.5	▲4.4%	▲3.3%	▼6.7%	▼31.1%
2007	▲118.7	▲8,352.4	▲51.0	▲3,588.3	▲2.2%	▲2.3%	▲6.9%	▼28.5%
2008	▲128.7	▲8,892.4	▲61.8	▲4,267.5	▲6.4%	▲8.4%	▼6.0%	▼24.2%
2009	▲130.3	▼8,837.9	▲62.5	▼4,241.9	▲0.6%	▲5.2%	▲6.5%	▼18.6%
2010	▲136.5	▲9,090.6	▲69.6	▲4,633.2	▲3.5%	▲3.6%	▼5.0%	▼17.7%
2011	▲150.3	▲9,843.0	▲79.3	▲5,192.9	▲7.9%	▲4.5%	▼4.2%	▼16.8%
2012	▲159.6	▲10,280.3	▲87.9	▲5,664.9	▲5.6%	▲5.1%	▼4.1%	▲17.5%
2013	▲175.2	▲11,106.1	▲95.1	▲6,030.5	▲4.9%	▲2.7%	▲4.2%	▲20.0%
2014	▲186.8	▲11,657.9	▲101.7	▲6,347.0	▲3.8%	▲3.6%	▼3.8%	▲27.1%
2015	▼179.3	▼11,014.9	▼99.3	▼6,099.4	▲0.1%	▲4.0%	▲4.8%	▲33.8%
2016	▲182.0	▼11,009.2	▲99.9	▼6,046.3	▼-1.2%	▲1.7%	▲5.2%	▲43.2%
2017	▲195.0	▲11,623.7	▲104.3	▲6,216.6	▲2.4%	▲0.4%	▼4.6%	▲44.6%
2018	▲202.2	▲11,880.3	▲107.6	▲6,318.5	▲1.3%	▲-0.2%	▼3.7%	▲49.1%
2019	▲205.9	▲11,923.0	▲108.1	▼6,260.6	0.0%	▲0.3%	▲3.8%	▲51.4%
2020	▼192.2	▼10,977.3	▼98.8	▼5,642.7	▼-7.8%	▲-0.3%	▲5.3%	▲61.2%
2021	▲204.7	▲11,528.8	▲104.5	▲5,884.1	▲2.8%	▲0.0%	▼4.6%	▼61.0%
2022	▲217.7	▲12,091.6	▲110.0	▲6,107.6	▲3.5%	▲2.1%	▼4.2%	▼59.9%
2023	▲228.5	▲12,516.0	▲114.1	▲6,247.5	▲2.5%	▲1.8%	▼4.1%	▼57.9%
2024	▲239.8	▲12,951.5	▲118.5	▲6,400.0	▲2.6%	▲1.5%	▼3.9%	▼56.2%
2025	▲251.8	▲13,408.7	▲123.2	▲6,561.7	▲2.8%	▲1.3%	▼3.7%	▼52.9%
2026	▲264.1	▲13,868.4	▲128.1	▲6,727.4	▲2.8%	▲1.0%	▼3.7%	▼49.6%

== See also ==
- Andean Community
- Andean Countries–United Kingdom Trade Agreement
- Corruption in Ecuador
- Economy of South America
- Economic history of Ecuador
- Ecuador Census
- China–Ecuador relations
- Latin American economy
- List of companies of Ecuador
- List of Latin American and Caribbean countries by GDP growth
- List of Latin American and Caribbean countries by GDP (nominal)
- List of Latin American and Caribbean countries by GDP (PPP)
- Mercosur
- Trade unions in Ecuador
