= List of banks in Ecuador =

This is a list of all the banks currently incorporated in Ecuador and some defunct banks.

== Central bank ==
- Central Bank of Ecuador

== Private-sector banks ==
- Banco Bolivariano
- Banco Cofiec
- Banco de Guayaquil
- Banco de Machala
- Banco del Austro
- Banco del Pacífico
- Banco Pichincha
- Banco Delbank
- Banco General Rumiñahui
- Banco Internacional
- Banco Finca
- ProCredit Bank
- Produbanco
- Banco Solidario
- Banco Sudamericano
- Citibank Ecuador
- Banco Promérica
- Banco Coopnacional
- Banco D-Miro
- Banco Capital

=== Most profitable banks ===
According to the Ecuadorian Superintendency of Banks, as of 2012, the ten most profitable banks in Ecuador were (ordered by profit): Banco Pichincha, Banco del Pacífico, Banco de Guayaquil, Produbanco, Banco Internacional and Banco Bolivariano, Banco del Austro, Banco Solidario, Citibank Ecuador and Unibanco (now merged with Banco Solidario).

=== Preference polls ===
A poll conducted by Advance Consultora in 2012 found that clients considered the best banks in the country were (ordered by preference): Banco Internacional, Produbanco, Banco del Pacífico, Banco Pichincha, Banco de Machala and Banco de Guayaquil.

== Defunct banks ==
- Filanbanco (closed in 2001, when it was Ecuador's biggest bank)
- Banco Comercial y Agrícola de Guayaquil (closed in 1925)
- Banco de la Previsora (closed in 1999)
- Banco de Préstamos (closed in 1998)
- Banco del Progreso (closed in 1999)
- Banco Territorial (closed in 2013)
- Unibanco (merged with Banco Solidario in 2013)

== See also ==
- Banking in Ecuador
