= Trade unions in Ecuador =

Disunited and poorly organized for most of its history, trade unions in Ecuador developed only slowly and had only a marginal political impact. Precise figures on unionization in the late 1980s were practically nonexistent, even within the unions themselves. The organized labor movement in Ecuador was divided into four confederations and a number of independent federations. At the local level, labor organizations also took the form of artisan guilds, cooperatives, and neighborhood associations. In addition to representing only a minority of the workers in all sectors of employment (approximately one-fifth), the labor movement traditionally was weakened by rivalry and government repression. Nevertheless, it had influence disproportionate to its numbers as a result of the concentration of trade unions in urban areas, mainly Quito and Guayaquil, its organizational power, and the political impact of strikes and demonstrations on governments that did not enjoy strong support.

Professional or employee associations (cámaras), composed of middle-class, white-collar workers, constituted about 25 percent of all trade unions. Representing the dominant economic groups in the country, these associations exercised a predominant influence on economic policy; their representatives frequently held cabinet posts and other top government positions dealing with economics. The support of the associations proved crucial to most governments.

== History ==
Although union organizations began forming in Ecuador early in the twentieth century, organized workers did not begin to acquire any influence until the late 1930s. Key events in Ecuador's labor history took place in 1938 with the promulgation of the Labor Code and the founding of the first labor confederation, the Ecuadorian Federation of Classist Organizations (Central Ecuatoriana de Organizaciones Clasistas, or Cedoc). Between 1938 and 1949, some 550 labor organizations were formed. These included the country's second confederation, the Confederation of Ecuadorian Workers (Confederación de Trabajadores Ecuatorianos, CTE), which began operating in 1944. A total of 3,093 unions were established between 1950 and 1973.

Cedoc was never an effective articulator of worker interests, being more concerned with religious causes, combating efforts to eliminate exclusion of ecclesiastical control and influence in labor organizations, and curtailing communist infiltration in the labor sector. Although of Catholic origin, Cedoc rejected its Christian Democratic leadership in 1976 and adopted a socialist orientation. The old leaders retained the support of a few grassroots organizations and formed a parallel organization. Approximately 80 percent of Cedoc's membership came from the Ecuadorian Federation of Peasant Organizations (Federación Ecuatoriana de Organizaciones Campesinas, or Fenoc). In the mid-1980s, Cedoc had unions in fifteen of the twenty provinces; its estimated membership of 130,000 was largely composed of artisans, with almost no industrial worker membership. After twelve years of political division, the two Cedoc branches united in 1988 and formed the Ecuadorian Confederation of Classist Organizations for Workers' Unity (Confederación Ecuatoriana de Organizaciones Clasistas para la Unidad de los Trabajadores, CEDOCUT).

Through militant activities, such as petitions, collective conflicts, and general strikes, the CTE—composed predominantly of industrial workers and led by members of the communist and socialist parties—emerged as the principal labor organization in Ecuador in the late 1970s. Although the CTE had become the largest of the three national confederations by the 1970s, its hegemony declined in the 1980s as a result of the growth of rival confederations, internal conflicts and splits, and governmental repression. In 1987 only a shadow remained of its peasant federation, the Ecuadorian Indian Federation (Federación Ecuatoriana de Indios, FEI). The CTE still included a number of industrial unions and various public-sector unions, and was organizing autonomous workers. It encompassed an estimated 55,000 members in 200 affiliated unions.

The Marxist-Leninist Communist Party of Ecuador established a small federation, the General Union of Ecuadorian Workers (Unión General de Trabajadores Ecuatorianos, UGTE), in an attempt to rival the CTE. Apart from the powerful National Union of Teachers (Unión Nacional de Educadores, UNE), which had about 100,000 members, the UGTE had little success in affiliating unions. Together with student unions and a few other groups, the UGTE formed the Popular Front (Frente Popular, FP), which in the 1980s was attempting to rival the United Workers Front (Frente Unitario de Trabajadores, FUT) in organizing protest action.

The Inter-American Regional Organization of Workers (Organización Regional Interamericana de Trabajadores, ORIT) tried to unify the non-Marxist unions by founding the Ecuadorian Confederation of Free Trade Union Organizations (Confederación Ecuatoriana de Organizaciones Sindicales Libres, CEOSL) in 1962. CEOSL, the third-largest confederation, membership consisted almost exclusively of urban white- and blue-collar workers. The CEOSL included fourteen provincial and thirteen national federations made up of a large proportion of industrial workers, a number of members from the service sector, and a small number of agricultural workers, peasants, and craftsmen.

FUT emerged in 1971 and eventually united the three main confederations—Cedoc, CEOSL, and CTE—plus a number of independent unions, including the Catholic Federation of Workers (Central Católica de Obreros, CCO), making FUT the country's largest workers' confederation. By the 1980s, FUT totaled an estimated 300,000 members and emerged as the leader of a massive movement that arose spontaneously to protest the economic crisis, and that greatly outnumbered the ranks of unionized workers. FUT nearly toppled President Osvaldo Hurtado in 1982 when he introduced austerity measures in the face of the debt crisis. In June 1988, FUT, together with the National Coordinator of Workers (Coordinadora Nacional de Trabajadores, CNT), the Confederation of Indigenous Nationalities of Ecuador (Confederación de Nacionalidades Indígenas del Ecuador, or Conaie), and FP, staged a one-day national strike aimed at obtaining a large increase in the minimum wage and a freeze on the prices of basic goods. It was the seventh general labor action against the Febres Cordero government and coincided with an ongoing strike by the UNE for a rise in monthly wages. The impact of FUT remained limited, however, because the federation tended to maintain its working-class orientation, based on wage claims, and in practice gave relatively little importance to the claims of other sectors that looked to it for leadership.
