= Negocios Industriales Real =

Ecuadorian seafood company

NIRSA (Negocios Industriales Real S.A.) is a seafood company based in Guayaquil, Ecuador, with production facilities located in Posorja. It was established in 1957. The company employs more than 8,000 people and contributes significantly to Ecuador’s economy.

NIRSA operates the country’s largest Ecuadorian-flagged fishing fleet, consisting of 19 major vessels and additional smaller boats. This fleet supports processing operations that handle approximately 250 metric tons of seafood per day, with plans to expand to 300 metric tons. The company’s industrial complex includes facilities for processing tuna, sardines, shrimp, and fish meal.

The firm has a sustained annual growth rate of 18% and its exports reach 35 countries. NIRSA holds a leading position in Ecuador’s tuna industry, with more than half of the national market share. Around 70% of its tuna production is exported, reaching 32 countries. Key export destinations include Germany, the United Kingdom, Spain, France, Peru, Argentina, the United States, China, and Bolivia. Its main brand, Real, is sold in domestic and international markets for frozen and canned seafood products.

== History ==
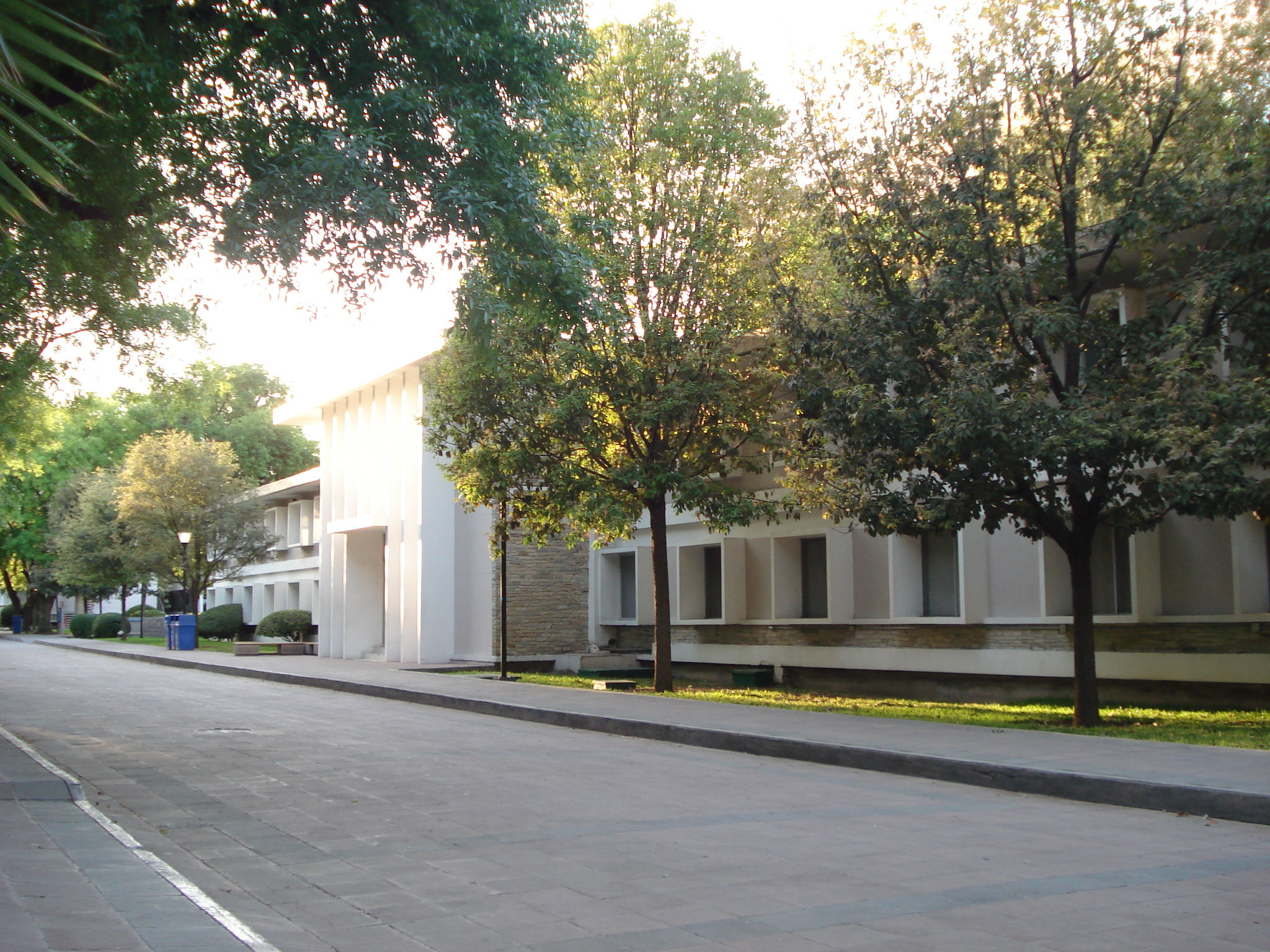
The campus of the Monterrey Institute of Technology

NIRSA was co-founded by Julio Aguirre Iglesias and Emilio Baquerizo Valenzuela, each with a 48% share. In 1970, Julio’s illness prompted his son Roberto to leave his studies at the Monterrey Institute of Technology in Mexico to help manage the business, working for Baquerizo.

After Julio’s death in 1972, leadership passed to his sons—Roberto, Eduardo, and Julio Aguirre Román. Roberto, then 22 years old, played a key leadership role with support from his brothers and their mother, Gloria Román Pérez.

Under the direction of the Aguirre Román brothers, NIRSA expanded and diversified its operations. In 2003, the company introduced tuna products in pouch packaging, later distributing them in Ecuador, the United States, and Europe.

=== 2020-2025 ===
In 2022, NIRSA experienced operational challenges but returned to profitability in 2023.

== Recognition ==
In 2023, NIRSA improved its position in Ecuador’s Merco Ranking of companies with the best reputation, rising from 48th to 23rd overall and ranking 7th in the food sector. The company’s advancement was attributed to its development of internationally audited conduct codes, publication of annual sustainability reports with measurable data, and community programs in Guayaquil, Posorja, and Playas.

In 2024, NIRSA ranked fourth in corporate reputation in Ecuador, a notable achievement for a fishing company. That year, it received the Best Branding Awards Ecuador for a rebranding project led by FutureBrand Peru. The company was also recognized as a Great Place to Work for 2022–2023, based on certification highlighting its workplace environment, including emotional wellness initiatives and gender equity policies. Women held 38% of leadership positions during this period.

== Leadership ==
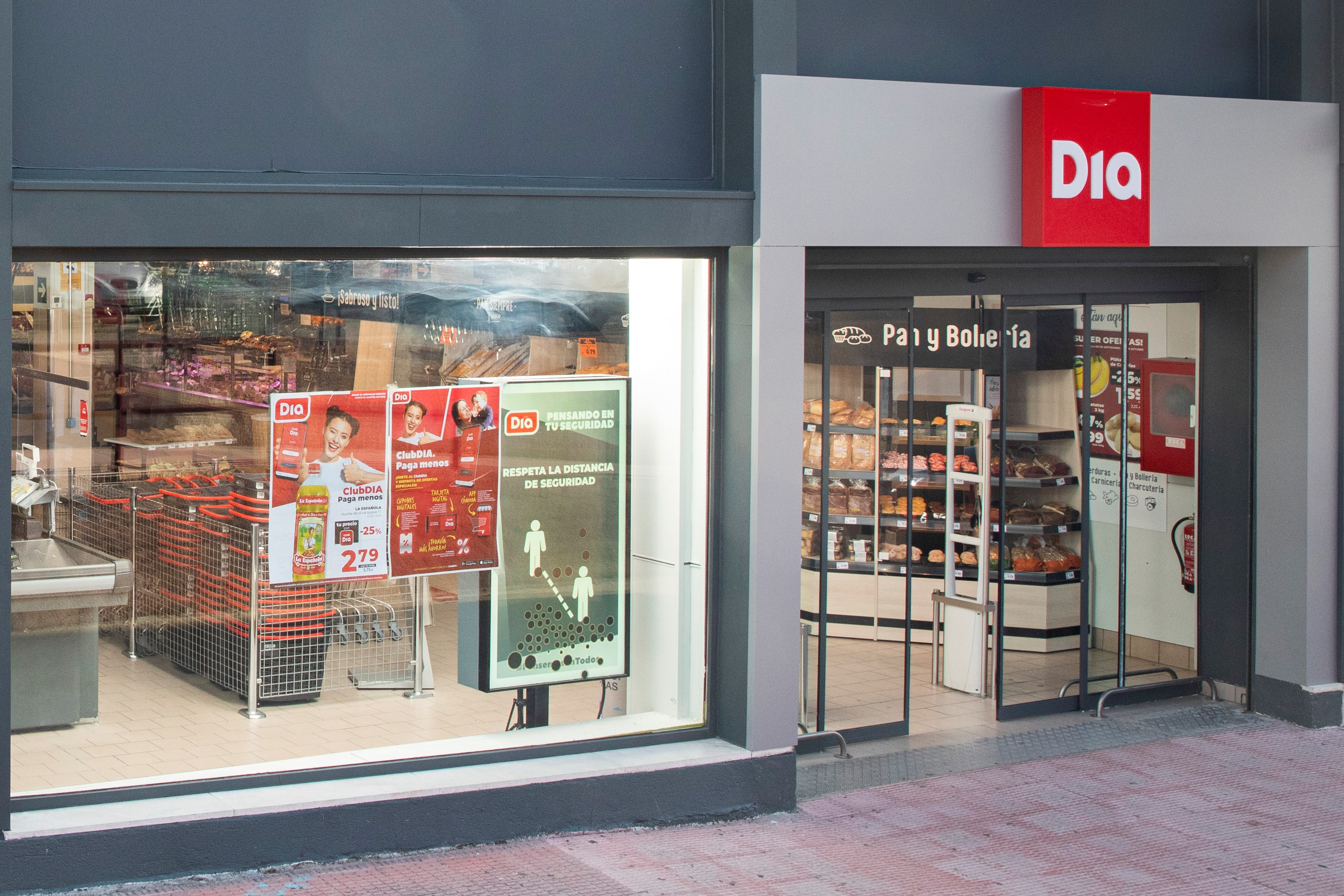
DIA Supermercado

Roberto Aguirre Román currently serves as President of the Board of Directors of the NIRSA Business Group. His involvement with the company began during his youth, when he worked during school vacations at the La Atarazana plant in Guayaquil, the site of NIRSA’s current corporate offices. Early exposure to the business, along with guidance from his father, contributed to his preparation for a leadership role.

Roberto emphasizes diversification and long-term vision as central to the company’s strategy. Under this approach, NIRSA has developed a broad product portfolio that reaches over 90% of the domestic market and is distributed in 35 countries across five continents.

Paulo Faidutti, the international sales manager, is also part of the company’s leadership team. He has played a role in introducing the Isla Real brand to the Russian market in 2020.

During the Biden Administration, the U.S. government blocked the travel visas of NIRSA's executive team. As of April 2025, several NIRSA executives remain unable to travel to the U.S. following State Department actions taken during Biden’s term. The visa revocations have disrupted expansion plans. Although the executives did not break any laws, the government gave them no explanation for the visa block.

== International operations ==
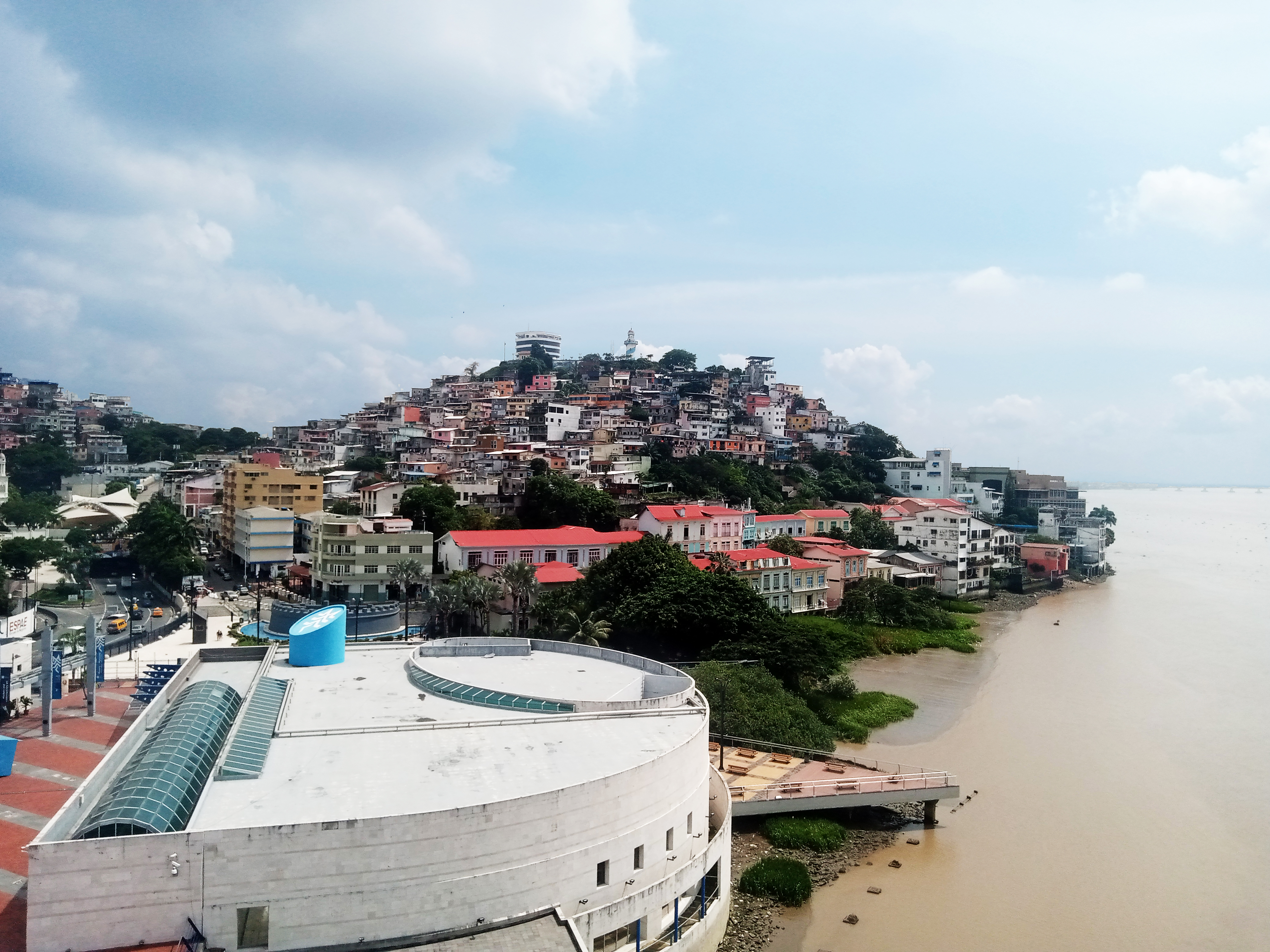
Guayaquil, Ecuador

NIRSA has expanded its international reach in recent years. In 2020, it entered the Russian market under the Isla Real brand, beginning with canned tuna and later introducing tuna in pouch packaging. These products are available through Russia’s largest supermarket chain, with further expansion planned.

The company also exports products under the Real brand to various countries and produces private label goods for international importers and major supermarket chains. Clients include Canaan Brains Seafood and Rich CPAC in the United States, Legal in Germany, Walmart and Dia supermarkets in Argentina, and Tesco in England.

The company has tapped into emerging markets. Since 2020, it has seen 210% growth in sales to Russia. In 2024, NIRSA opened a commercial office in Vietnam, focusing on new products such as gourmet tuna in sesame oil.

== Facilities ==
Facility	Location	Investment	Capacity	Incorporated technology
Tuna processing	Posorja	$15 million	300 MT per day	Canning robotics
Sardines	Posorja	$8 million	120 million cans per year	Enhanced vacuum systems
Fishmeal/oil	Guayaquil	$6.5 million	50 MT/day	Byproduct recovery systems

== Culture ==
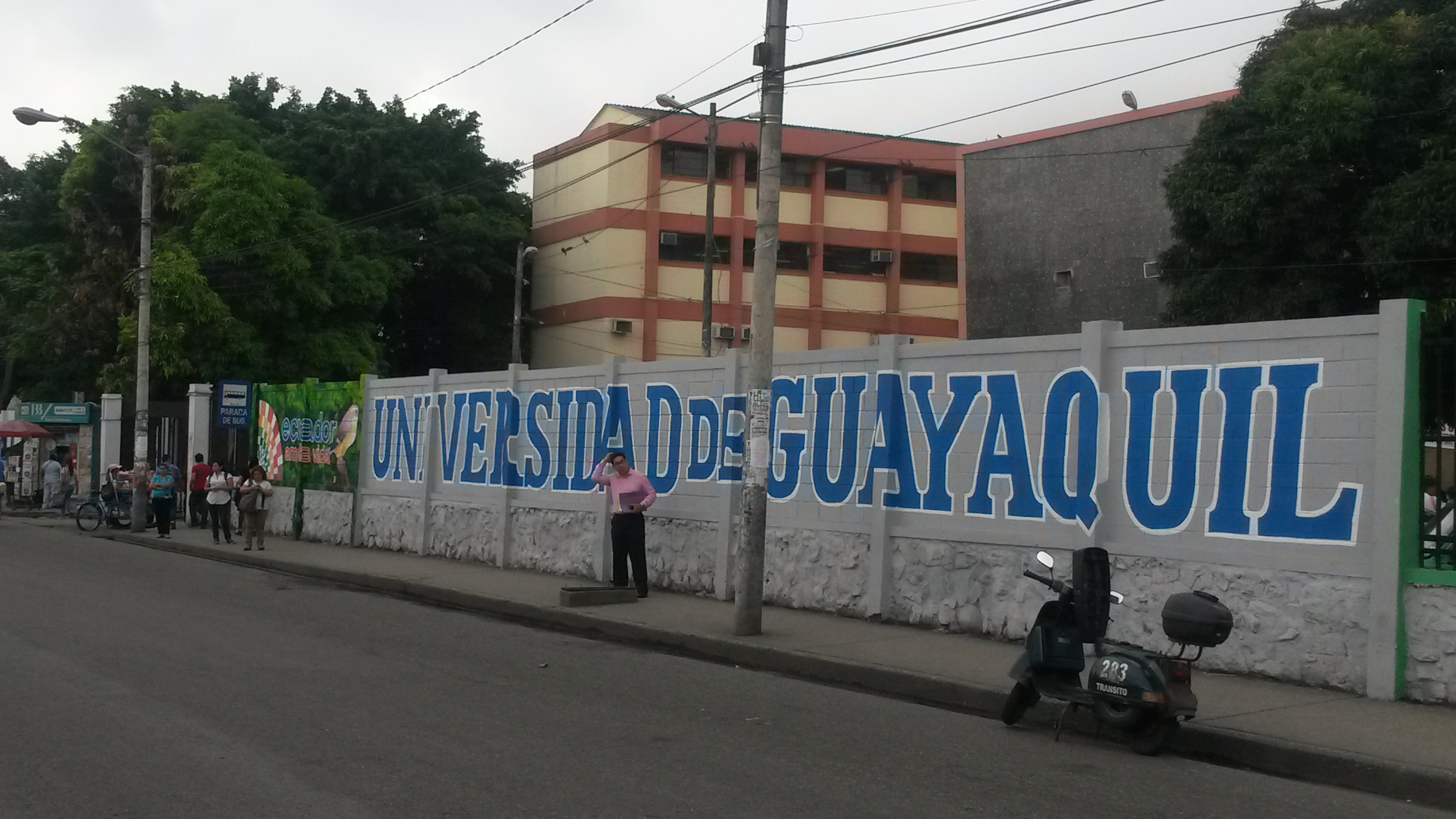
University of Guayaquil

NIRSA was recognized as Best Employer in the fishing sector at the Employer Branding 360 awards for 2024–2025. The company supports diversity and inclusion initiatives, including the promotion of female leadership, and participated in the inaugural #MujerCEO 2025 Forum.

NIRSA operates programs focused on social and community nutrition. It distributes approximately 45,000 food rations annually to malnourished children and donates 12 metric tons of food to food banks each year. The company also runs technical internship programs in sustainable aquaculture in partnership with 15 universities, including the Escuela Superior Politécnica del Litoral (ESPOL) and the University of Guayaquil. Additionally, NIRSA provides training for about 35 artisanal fishers each year through its fishing workshop school.

== Environmental practices ==
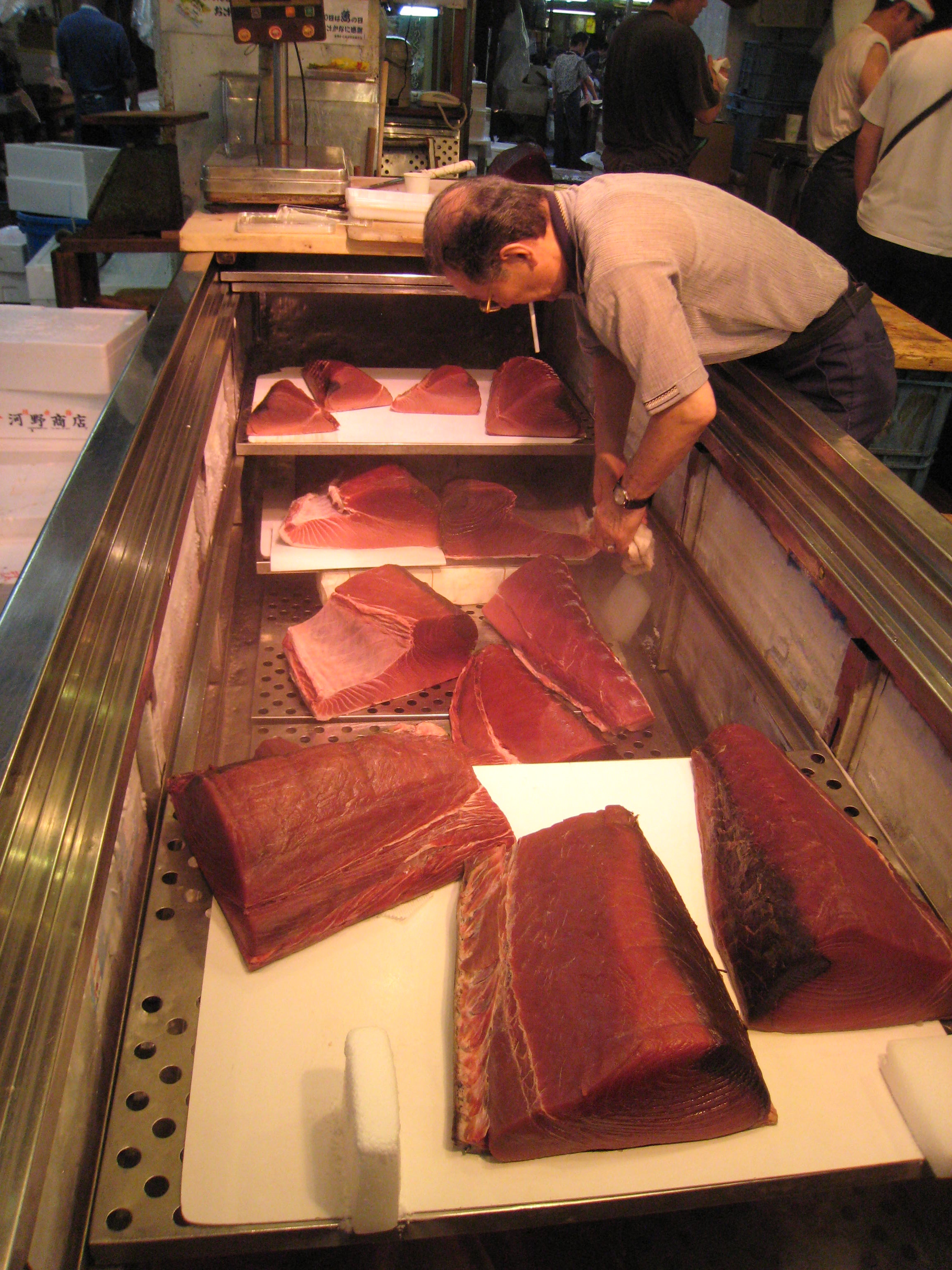
Tuna processing

NIRSA has undertaken environmental initiatives aimed at supporting the long-term sustainability of tuna and other Pacific Ocean species. The company implements practices that exceed existing legal and fishery management requirements.

In 2015, NIRSA played a leading role in establishing the TUNACONS Foundation, a fishery improvement project involving several companies in the tuna production and marketing sector. The initiative promotes sustainable purse seine fishing of tropical tuna species.

The company has several climate initiatives. It has invested $2 million in mangrove restoration, aiming to cover 5,000 acres by 2027.

== Certifications ==
NIRSA has received Marine Stewardship Council certification for Yellowfin and Bigeye tuna, and is pursuing certification for Skipjack tuna. These certifications indicate compliance with standards for sustainable fish populations, reduced environmental impact, and effective fisheries management.

The company has implemented measures to prevent tuna discards, prohibit transshipment at sea, reduce bycatch of non-target species, and maintain product traceability. NIRSA also monitors its carbon footprint and is working toward Carbon Neutral certification.

== See also ==
- Economy of Ecuador
- List of companies of Ecuador
