= Marcel Jacobo Laniado de Wind =

Ecuadorian agricultural engineer and banker

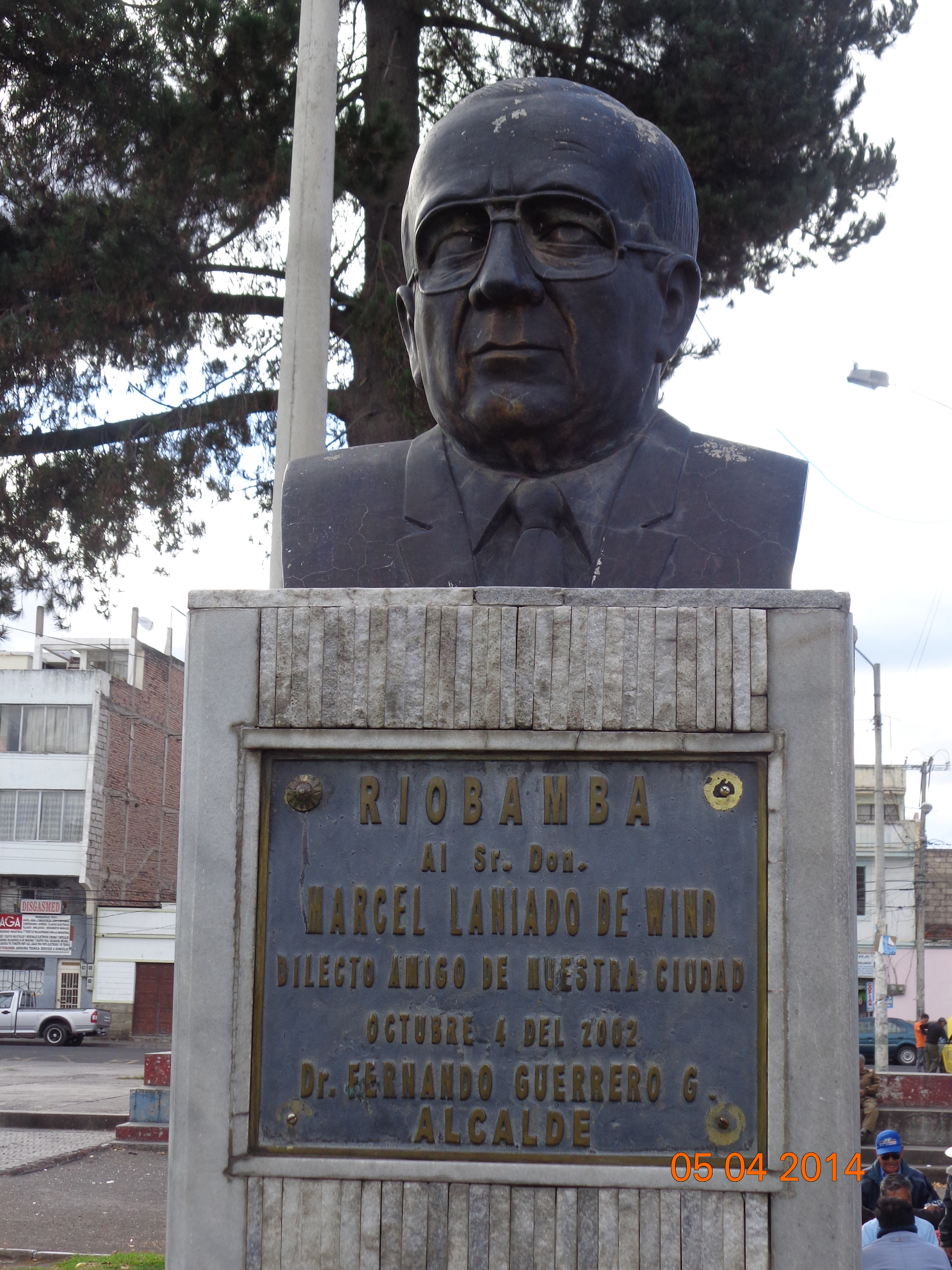
- Born: June 4, 1927; Guayaquil, Ecuador
- Died: April 8, 1998 (aged 70); Houston, United States
- Education: Colegio La Salle, Quito, Ecuador
- Alma mater: Escuela Agricola Panamericana (i.e. "Zamorano")
- Occupations: Agricultural engineer, Banker
- Known for: Founder Banco de Machala (first General Manager and minority shareholder); Founder Banco del Pacifico (first President and minority shareholder)
- Spouse(s): Sara Susana Castro Benitez (first spouse); Isabel Gonzalez Rubio (second spouse)
- Children: Maria Elena; Mauricio Enrique; Maria Isabel; Marcel J Guayaquil; Maria de Lourdes
- Parent(s): Maurice Jacob Laniado Hassig (deceased); Fredika Wind Davila (deceased)
- Relatives: Cecile (sister - Deceased); Rodrigo (brother); Marta (sister)

Marcel Jacobo Laniado de Wind (June 4, 1927 – August 8, 1998) was an Ecuadorian agricultural engineer and banker who held a number of important public and private positions in Ecuador. He was a humanist, and a public figure in Ecuador for his efforts to improve the country.

He founded both the "Banco de Machala," which helped develop the trade of bananas in the El Oro Province of Ecuador, and later in 1971 founded "Banco del Pacifico." He was known for creating credit approval policies friendly to all economic groups, including loans for small farmers and small businesses; microcredit for artisans and low income people. He was influential in bringing internet to much of Ecuador in the early 1990s. From 1984 to 1986, he served as Ecuador's Minister of Agriculture under Leon Febres Cordero, as well as a number of other positions.

== Early life, education ==
Marcel Jacobo Laniado de Wind was born on June 4, 1927, in Guayaquil, Ecuador. His father, Maurice Jacob Laniado Hassig, was born in French Algeria, and had both Jewish roots and roots in Haifa in Palestine (of the Ottoman Empire). Laniado Hassig emigrated to Ecuador via Manaus, Brazil, and began living in a Jewish community in Quito. There Laniado Hassig met and married Fredika Wind Davila, a Dutch-Jewish woman who was born in Quito. Fredika Wind Davila's father was Maurice de Wind, a Dutch Jew, and her mother was Mercedes Davila Peñaherera of Quito.

Laniado Hassig started his career as a dealer and mechanic. He and his wife later moved to Ancón, a small city in the Guayas Province, where the British oil company Anglo Ecuadorian Oilfields Limited established its camp for all its personnel. According to Marcel Laniado de Wind, his father moved to the camp for protection against the epidemics sweeping Ecuador, as at the time Ancon was an island of development and health. There Laniado Hassig established the only hotel managed by a non-native, and also opened a small general store. Laniado Hassig soon pursued trading in the South border town Santa Rosa, El Oro Province, despite the wishes of his wife. He began importing textiles and livestock.

At this time, three of his four children were born. Marcel was born in 1927, Cecilia was born in 1928, Marta was born 1930, and Rodrigo was born 1933. Marcel Laniado de Wind attended elementary school at the camp in Ancón, and later boarded at La Salle School in Quito, where he completed secondary studies.

Seeking asylum in El Oro

In 1941, at age 14, Marcel Jacobo Laniado de Wind and his family were forced to seek refuge in Zaruma in the Province of El Oro during the Peruvian invasion of Ecuador, the family lost its home and belongings. After the invasion Hassig and family moved momentarily to Guayaquil, and then to Machala in the El Oro Province where they started from scratch. In Machala, his father began making iron components for ice makers and gasoline pumps, and put together an ice maker factory and a gas station as a distributor for the British company Anglo Ecuadorian Oilfields, and managed to save enough to educate the children, chiefly in culture and Jewish tradition. After the war, his mother Fredika de Wind de Laniado had to recreate personal documents and re-obtain a passport. She changed her name to Harriet instead of Fredika and was affectionately called "Rica".

Laniado de Wind's status as a child of immigrants, with a name that few locals could pronounce, framed him as an outsider. He admired the positive qualities of the social and economic elites in Ecuador, but observed vices and defects that created inequality and impeded the country's progress.

He completed undergraduate studies at the Pan American Agricultural School at El Zamorano, Honduras, where he graduated in 1949 with a degree in agronomy. That year he returned to Machala. His father died a few months later, and at 22 years old he became head of the household and the family business. He helped care for his young siblings and helped educate Cecil in the United States and Rodrigo in Chile.

== Mayor of Machala ==
At 30 years old, in 1957, he became president of the Machala Rotary Club, and spearheaded paving the first three streets in the city after raising money from the Municipality and the Development Bank. According to de Wind, "That made the machaleños think I could be a good mayor." He decided to run for office, and his win was considered an upset to the political order of the time, which was dominated by families with tight political and economic control of the region. As mayor of Machala, he depoliticized fiscal and municipal actions, and focused on infrastructure for drinking water, telephone communications, and wastewater management.

== Banco de Machala ==
The Province of El Oro was isolated from the rest of Ecuador many years after the Peruvian invasion in fear of a new invasion, which kept private investors away from the region. Public investment was also minimal, particularly the construction of roads. The only alternative to a long land route via the town of Cuenca to Machala is maritime transport via the Gulf of Guayaquil. After the war with Peru, a fear of a new invasion kept investors away from the region. Attention from both the private and public sector was minimal. According to Laniado de Wind, "When I returned from school...I found conditions ripe for agricultural development. But there was no bank to pay services. [While running for Governor], I promised first that I would get a bank to open a branch in Machala. It proved impossible as no banks were interested. So I created one."

He ceased to be Governor in 1962, and after fund-raising five million sucres using local capital, he founded the Banco de Machala later that year. It was the first and to date the only Machalan bank started with local funds. Within a few months the bank had a large modern building in Machala, which was comparable to major bank buildings of the time in cities such as Quito and Guayaquil.

Laniado de Wind's stated goal was to create a trustworthy bank that was not dominated by elite families, and that would encourage private investment to help develop the province. Unlike other Ecuadorian banks of the time, individual shareholders did not control the bank.

He created gender-blind lines of credit for small and medium banana and coffee crop farmers. He also modernized processes of credit approval and the management of depository accounts. At the time, the bank's semi-automatic payment of checks was unique in the country.

He also helped establish cooperative public trade unions in Ecuador such as the General Union of Teachers. This allowed the quality of education in the region to remain stable, even when the government routinely generated financial stoppages. This helped minimize strikes.

=== Alamos Agricultural Society ===
Around 1964, a partnership 75% Esteban Quirola Figueroa and 25% Marcel J Laniado acquired 11,000 Has. of a farm called "Los Alamos" located in Guayas Province, Churute Region, between the Gulf of Guayaquil and a town called Puerto Inca, a farm originally owned by Standard Fruit Company (later known as Dole), the largest independent producer of bananas in the world. Laniado de Wind was the first General Manager. Basically Standard Fruit Company was losing this farm with a Communist labor Union, which did not allow working properly on the farm, low morale and a German origin manager incapable to bring the farm up to good production. Under this circumstances Standard Fruit Company proposed for Laniado de Wind to buy the property. Laniado spoke fondly of "Los Alamos" as his favorite project. Under his management, the property began producing an average of 125,000 annual weekly boxes of bananas from a banana plantation of 3,000 Has. A new method of protection for each finger of the banana clusters was developed, allowing minimum shrinkage and high quality; a new banana packing plant design took place; new banana production methodology, new irrigation systems, etc. The technologies applied in Alamos soon became standard practices in Ecuadorian farming. In addition and in order to diversify a 300 Has. of oranges were planted; a 100 has. of vegetables were planted, and a ranch of 7,500 Santa Gertrudis cattle for beef was added, which routinely won awards at livestock fairs for the best specimen of the breed. He organized the estate to fit the needs of employees, and the farm had a commissary, infirmary, church, cinema, and parks for workers. A team of resident physicians provided the workers and their families with free health care. In addition, all employee children had to attend the in-house based school, which at the time had a top curriculum, including the practice of the English language as a mandatory course. It installed a rural telephone network, linking offices, houses and other buildings of the farm, for internal use, and connect with the rest of the country or internationally. this infrastructure were not found in other farms or rural towns in Ecuador at that time, was the first of its kind.

Natural areas such as the Churute Park Reserve were set aside and protected from poaching. The location focused on sanitation and clean water, and had an at the time innovative trash collection system.

== Banco del Pacifico ==
During 1970 and 1971, Marcel Laniado de Wind and his main partner Esteban Quirola developed different visions of the farm and bank business. Laniado de Wind proposed to his partner to either buy or sell the farm shares from or to him. Quirola agreed to sell to Laniado de Wind his 75% shares of the farm for an agreed price, as a "gentlemen's agreement." Quirola had already started to buy Banco de Machala shares from other shareholders and became the majority shareholder. Laniado de Wind traveled to New York to talk to contacts at Citibank for financing to buy Alamos. Standard Fruit Company committing to retain a percentage of the banana box price to repay the loan to Citibank, the loan was approved. Laniado de Wind returned to the country to close the deal, but Mr. Quirola changed his mind and decided to buy Laniado de Wind's 25% instead. Marcel Laniado de Wind resigned the day after Quirola's actions, selling his stake in Hacienda Los Alamo, resigning as General Manager of Los Alamos, and leaving his post as General Manager of Banco de Machala.

The day after resigning he started the process of founding a new bank. He presented the project to private investors and friends and convinced 447 investors to contribute 40 million sucres, and also to form the initial list of shareholders. On April 10, 1972, he went public with Banco del Pacifico.

The business model was revolutionary for its time. Other banks at the time were owned by elite family groups or institutions, and access to services and credit was typically reserved for social classes or groups the bank owners were familiar with. In contrast, Banco del Pacifico proposed to serve all social and economic groups, and their slogan was "In the Banco del Pacifico you do not need to be a friend of the manager." The bank also democratized shareholding, as compared to allowing just a few shareholders to control the bank. Returns were not offered directly to a potential shareholder, who were instead motivated by the reward of helping develop the country. This business model remains unique in Ecuador.

Laniado de Wind claimed this system relied on the integrity of the singular banker, who was there to simply manage the resources of others while owning no shares. In this way, no shareholders could unduly influence the management of the bank. "We have a million customers with deposits exceeding six trillion sucres. One [person] manages the resources of the people and those resources cannot be used in personal business. We have no business. I have no shares in anything with anybody, and nobody can say 'I'm your partner.'" This allowed the bank to have a unique level of transparency within the financial system of Ecuador.

In 1972, a military coup ended the last Velasco period, initiating the country's oil era and the development of the state as an entrepreneur with strategic resources. The Banco del Pacifico began to provide credit and resources to regions that had previously been neglected, chiefly serving the middle class and the onslaught of private entrepreneurial companies appearing in the 1970s and 1980s. The bank grew extremely quickly, becoming one of the largest banks in the country, and eventually the largest.

=== Advances ===
Laniado de Wind gained a reputation as an innovator in developing electronic banking products. In 1975 Banco del Pacifico installed the first computer system in Ecuadorian banking, with a network of five line terminals. He also helped introduce the Audiomático, phone banking, Telebán, Intermático, computer banking, internet banking, and helped advance the processing of receipts and payments so that transactions could be completed from home or the office 24 hours every day.

Credit to the Community

In 1977, the bank established the Artisan Credit program, later renamed Credit to the Community. This program was unique in its kind, only also offered by the Ford Foundation. This program provided micro loans to artisans in more deprived peripheral regions of the country. The loans were made without collateral or targeted preferential interest rates, with the warranty and ability to pay determined by references from within the artisan community. The bank managed the loan and provided assistance with accounting if needed, and helped create accessible systems for the time and amount of payment.

"With its unique philosophy of providing greater access to credit to all sectors of the economy, including artisans and small businesses and becoming a catalyst for development of the country, the Banco del Pacifico revolutionized the financial system." The program was the flagship of Marcel Laniado de Wind, as he felt it justified the rationale for the bank. This program came to move from status to about 600 artisans to micro entrepreneurs per semester.

In 1979, it installed the first ATM Bancomático in the country, which was also the first in South America. In 1980, Banco del Pacifico was the first and only financial institution that offered a loan program for studies in foreign universities. He also promoted the Swift system for Ecuador. The company installed the first Foreign Currency computer system, and later through the promotion of a third party created the Foreign Currency Trade market among Banks in Ecuador. After analyzing how gold was traded, and the complaints of small gold producers, the Bank installed the first gold buying program to small producers, and in few months became the major exporter of Gold in Ecuador, until a few years that Banco Central changes the rule and the Gold business was no longer was possible.

=== EcuaNet ===
In Ecuador, the first institution to provide access to the Internet was Ecuanex, an Internet node established in 1991 by the Agency for Electronic Communication Corporation, or Intercom. This network is part of the global network for Global Communications Institute / Alliance for Progressive Communications (IGC / APC), which provides this service to NGOs and development."

In 1992, Laniado created a subsidiary of Banco del Pacifico called EcuaNet, whose purpose was to provide Internet service to Ecuador via a second node. It was especially intended to be free for educational institutions and non-profit organizations. Already a year before the first Internet node had been formed and developed, Ecuanex offered the service solely to nonprofit institutions in Quito such as Accion Ecologica, ALAI, CAAP, CITY, CONUEP, FLACSO, and the Universidad Andina Simon Bolivar.

=== Subsidiaries ===
Under his leadership, Banco del Pacifico constituted a number of domestic and foreign subsidiaries.

- Pacific National Bank N. A (Miami, USA)
- Pacific National Bank S. A. (Panama)
- Pacific National Bank (Colombia)
- Pacific National Bank (London Representative Office)
- Almagro Storekeeper of Agriculture
- Unicredit (MasterCard of Ecuador)
- Leasing del Pacifico
- Factor del Pacifico
- Valores del Pacifico
- Seguros Sucre, bought from Royal Insurance UK

The Pacifico Financial Group constituted Ecuador's largest, under the leadership of Marcel Laniado de Wind. The Pacific Group created the Huancavilca Foundation. The formation of neighborhood shops with access to competitively priced food was the central goal of the foundation. It considered stores a basis for community development, by selling quality food for the lowest possible price. The Foundation developed the first Community Development Center in Guasmo, south of Guayaquil.

Huancavilca Foundation also provided banking services to the community served by the school by moving the ominous presence of chulqueros (loan sharks). It included a collection center for recyclable materials, distribution of construction materials, and the develop of pharmacy and mail services and public telephones.

Laniado de Wind remained a supporter of his alma mater, the Escuela Agricola Panamericana in Zamorano, Honduras.

In 1996, Laniado de Wind and Zamoranos founded the Wilson Popenoe Foundation, with the sole purpose of funding scholarships for Ecuadorians to attend Zamorano. It started with an endowment from Wilson Popenoe "Doris Stone" to finance the education of Ecuadorians in El Zamorano, with the Banco del Pacifico intervening as a counterpart. When he was minister of agriculture in 1984, he obtained a U.S. Aid fund for the same purpose. He later became a member of the Board of Trustees of El Zamorano in Boston, USA.

After Laniado de Wind's death, Banco del Pacifico became a casualty of the 1998–99 Ecuador banking crisis and the bank was nationalized.

== Government positions ==
=== Minister of Agriculture ===
From 1984 to 1988, he was Minister of Agriculture in the administration of Leon Febres Cordero. In the short period that he served as minister, he established significant changes in the sector. Established a weekly official price in USD for a box of bananas. He also determined the actual import cost to produce a box of bananas. He formed the Agricultural Commodity Exchange. He worked on controlling smuggling and encouraging domestic production.

He modernized the transparency of the Institute for Agrarian Reform, and put in place clear policies and rules on the import of the basic family basket of food.

During the Sixto Duran Ballen Government Laniado de Wind was President of CONAM, a government agency dedicated to planning for the development of Ecuador, and prioritizing main developments projects such as improving the Ecuadorian mail system, improving the Communication System, and planning Ecuador Highway infrastructure among other things.

In 1988 he retired and was replaced as Minister by Enrique Coppiano.

=== Other positions ===
In the Guayaquil Welfare Board ("Junta de Beneficencia de Guayaquil"), he served as a board member and director of the lottery. In that position, he pushed for the modernization of lottery printing, and introduced to new lottery types.

He was also the president of CEDEGE on two occasions, a government institution devoted to the coast hydroelectric power plant and irrigation systems. The institution had been plagued by delays in implementation, with projects often postponed and forgotten by successive public administrations. Laniado focused on finishing those projects, and a number of projects were named after him, including the hydroelectric plant, the dam that serves the irrigation system for the Santa Elena Peninsula, The Potable water plant for the Peninsula de Santa Elena, and The Bulubulu flood control system. These were chief development projects in Ecuador in the 80's and 90's.

== Career positions ==
=== Positions ===
He has held the following positions:

- Banco de Fomento Board Member, Machala, Ecuador.
- 1958-1962: Mayor of Machala, El Oro Province, Ecuador
- 1967: Elected by popular vote for El Oro Province as Congressman (Diputado Nacional)
- 1964: Founder President of Empresa Electrica de El Oro
- 1984-Nov 1986: Minister of Agriculture
- 1987-1988: President Private Bank Association
- 1992-1994: Board of Director Chairman of CEDEGE ( Comision de Estudios para el Desarrollo de la Cuenca del Rio Guayas)
- 1994: Chairman of the National Modernization Council (Conam)

Educational positions

- Fundacyt-Espol (Guayaquil, Ecuador)
- Board of Trustees of Zamorano (Boston, USA)
- EDUCATE Foundation (Guayaquil, Ecuador)
- Foundation for the Development of Agriculture, i.e. FUNDAGRO (Guayaquil, Ecuador)
- Santa Maria Technical University (Guayaquil, Ecuador)
- Fundación Ecuador (Guayaquil, Ecuador)
- Foundation Huancavilca
- Charity Board of Guayaquil (Guayaquil, Ecuador)

=== Private positions ===
- 1957: President of the Rotary Club Machala, Ecuador. 1957
- 1962-1971: Case Banco de Machala 1962, where he was General Manager until 1971
- 1964-1971: He began working with the Alamos Agricultural Society SA 1964, and was their General Manager until 1971.
- 1966-1969: Executive Director of Anglo Ecuadorian Oilfields Limited, Quito.
- Member of the International Board of Burma Oil Company. London, England 1966-1969
- 1972-1998: Cover Banco del Pacifico in 1972, and was Executive Chairman until 1998.
- 1984: Case Founder and President of International Chamber of Commerce and in 1991 for second time its President
- Junta de Beneficencia de Guayaquil Board Member, Lottery section Presidente del Directorio del Hotel Oro Verde Machala during the promotion period until the hotel finalized its construction and was inaugurated.

== Awards and honors ==
- Decoration of the National Order of Merit Knight Degree, awarded by the Government of Dr. Otto Arosemena Gomez.
- 1979: The Organization of American States (OEA) and the Forum of the Americas chose him as one of the "15 Notable Americans."
- 1993: Doctor Honoris Causa of the Polytechnic School of the Coast, ESPOL in recognition of ongoing contributions to the institution and the country.
- 1997: Decoration "Francisco Pizarro" awarded by Santa Elena Municipality for his work at CEDEGE, finishing the Daule Peripa Dam to transfer about 756 millions of cubic meters of water per year to Peninsula de Santa Elena, the Chongon and Azucar Dams to irrigate the San Rafael town, the rich Zapotal valley and the Chanduy-Rio Verde zone, and also for signing the agreement to Supply Potable water and its distribution to residences in Santa Elena, together with Waste Water treatment for Playas, Posorja, El Morro, Santa Elena, Salinas, La libertad, Jose luis Tamayo, Atahualpa, Ancon, Anconcitom Ballenita y San Pablo, among importants towns in Peninsula Santa Elena.

== Death ==
He died in Houston, United States on August 5, 1998.

== See also ==
- Banking in Ecuador
- Economy of Ecuador
