= List of companies of Ecuador =

Notable Ecuadorian companies list

Location of Ecuador

Ecuador is a country in South America. The country's largest exports are oil and agricultural products such as bananas and seafood. The COVID-19 pandemic in Ecuador and declining oil prices have greatly strained the business environment.

For further information on the types of business entities in this country and their abbreviations, see "Business entities in Ecuador".

== Notable firms ==
This list includes notable companies with primary headquarters located in the country. The industry and sector follow the Industry Classification Benchmark taxonomy. Organizations which have ceased operations are included and noted as defunct.

Notable companies Status: P=Private, S=State; A=Active, D=Defunct
Name	Industry	Sector	Headquarters	Founded	Notes	Status	
Claro Ecuador	Telecommunications	Mobile provider & fixed line telecommunications	Guayaquil	1993	Telecommunication operator	P	A
Corporación Favorita C.A.	Self-service stores	Department Store, Supermarket, and Hypermarket	Quito	1952	Conglomerate service	P	A
Correos del Ecuador	Industrials	Delivery services	Quito	1831	Postal services	S	A
CNT EP	Telecommunications	Fixed line telecommunications	Quito	2008	State telecom	S	A
Ecua-Andino Hats	Consumer goods	Clothing & accessories	Guayaquil	1985	Hat makers	P	A
Ecuavisa	Consumer services	Broadcasting & entertainment	Quito	1967	Television programming	P	A
Marathon Sports	Consumer services	Specialty Retailers	Quito	1981	Sporting goods retailer	P	A
Petroecuador	Oil & gas	Exploration & production	Quito	1989	State oil and gas, OPEC member	S	A
TAME	Consumer services	Airlines	Quito	1962	Airline	P	D
Tía	Consumer services	Broadline retailers	Quito	1940	Food retailing (supermarket chain)	P	A
Tonicorp	Dairy products	Milk	Guayaquil	1970	Drinks	P	A

== See also ==
- List of airlines of Ecuador
- List of banks in Ecuador
