= Energy policy of Ecuador =

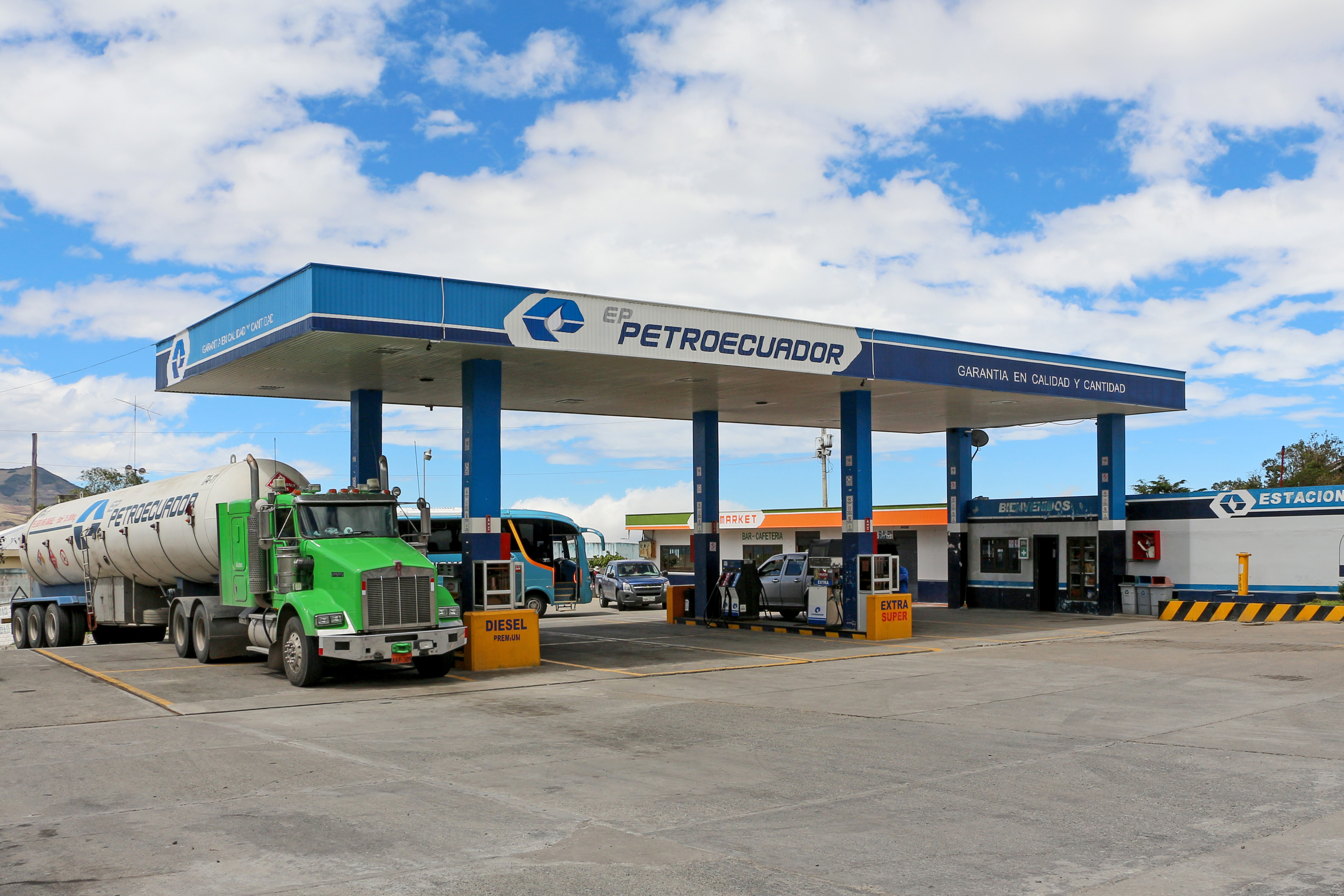
Petroecuador petrol station on the Pan-American Highway in Ecuador

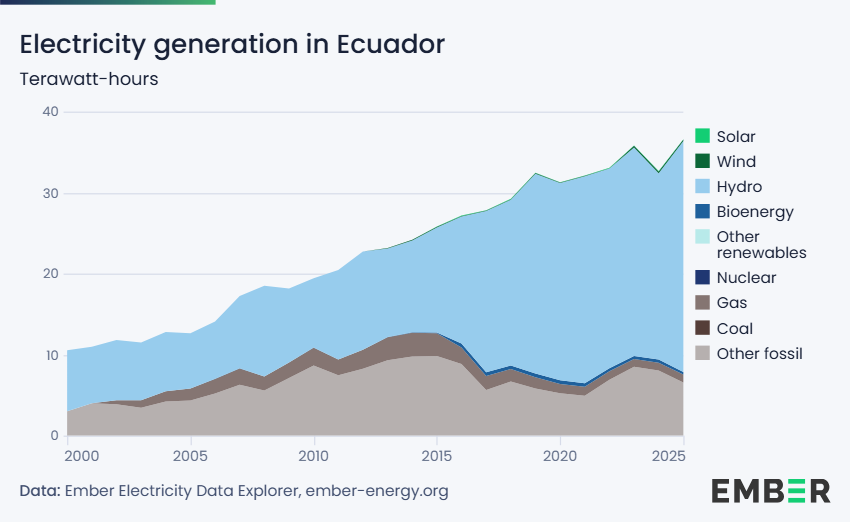
Electricity generation in Ecuador in terawatt-hours

Energy policy in Ecuador is driven by its need for energy security as a developing country as well as its conservation efforts. Despite past and ongoing attempts to take charge in energy sustainability (as with the now defunct Yasuni-ITT initiative), oil production and exportation still supports its small $5,853 GDP/capita economy at an average of 549,000 barrels/day in 2016. The push and pull between energy independence/nationalism and appeasement of conservationist groups (representing the concerns of environmentalists and indigenous groups) has been evident in the country’s shifting stance on renewable energies and fossil fuels.

Currently, the state is in charge of all domestic activities regarding the refining and distribution of oil and oil products. The state-owned company, Petroecuador, oversees and executes all related operations. The country is also seeing the construction of a new heavy crude refinery compound, operated by Refinery of the Pacific Eloy Alfaro but funded and built by Pertroecuador. Despite Ecuador’s large oil production, its main source of electricity is hydropower -for the year 2015, 13,096 GWh of electricity came from hydropower facilities as opposed to oil's 8,919 GWh. The Ecuadorian government has also passed legislation incentivizing the growth of renewable energy markets; one example of such policy is the feed-in tariff, which is a contract guaranteeing agents investing in renewable technology a competitive return on investment.

In 2023-24 there was electricity blackouts in Ecuador. New President Daniel Noboa appointed Andrea Arrobo as Minister of Energy in 2023. In April 2024, he asked for her resignation as a new schedule of blackouts was announced.

== Refinery of the Pacific Eloy Alfaro ==
In 2016, oil made up 30% of Ecuador's total exports at a value $5.05 billion; it ranked as the 55th largest oil exporter in the world. Despite having three small refineries in the Esmeraldas, Shushufundi, and La Libertad sites operated by Petroecuador, the country lacks the ability to refine heavy crude. As such, Ecuador is a net importer of refined fuels, buying mainly from the United States.

The Refinery of the Pacific Eloy Alfaro (RDP), a petrochemical company with a compound currently under development, would allow Ecuador to refine up to 300,000 barrels/day once fully operational. The company is owned by Petroecuador, Petroleos de Venezuela SA, and the China National Petroleum Corporation. The project is estimated to cost $12 billion and return $3 billion/year that would otherwise be spent on refined fuels. It is being constructed in El Aromo, in the coastal province of Manabi. Completion of the refinery would take place in two phases, the first yielding a processing capacity of 200,000 barrels/day and the second adding another 100,000 barrels/day.

The necessary access roads and central camp were completed in 2014. In 2016, the company announced the completion of the La Esperanza Multipurpose Aqueduct, a prerequisite project that would supply the refinery with water necessary for its processes. Despite a current investment sum of $1.23 billion from Petroecuador, the venture has seen financing setback. On August 21, 2017, the minister of hydrocarbons, Carlos Pérez García, announced that the government would not contribute any more funds towards the project and instead turn towards foreign investment. The project has become a point of contention with civilians, advocacy groups, and nationalist political groups due to its heavy reliance on Chinese capital and its contradiction of sumak kawsay, "good living" in Quechua. Sumak kawsay describes the state's harmony with its different ethnic cultures and natural environments.

== Energy Sovereignty ==
Ecuador’s 20th constitution (established in 2008) mentions multiple forms of sovereignty, including energy sovereignty. Self-sufficiency is one of the pillars of energy sovereignty as discussed by former President Rafael Correa’s administration. The administration called for the following objectives:

1.) an increase in the capacity for extracting natural resources

2.) a decrease in the imports of processed fuels

3.) a shift in electricity generation towards hydropower facilities.

Another pillar of energy sovereignty previously discussed by the administration is the defense of natural resources against international energy companies.

The change in energy imports does not reflect the original proposal. Since 2008, Ecuador has more than doubled its imports of gasoline/diesel (1.494M tonnes/year to 3.175M tonnes/year) while less than halving its imports of fuel oil (531K tonnes/year to 286K tonnes/year). The contribution of hydropower to electricity, however, does meet the originally proposed plan. It has risen since 2008 (back then at 11,294 GWh), while the electricity generated from oil has decreased (from 5,554 GWh). Ecuador has also increased oil production and exportation. In July 2017, the country announced it would keep increasing exports, publicly breaking rank with OPEC. The organization had promised to lower overall barrel production as global oil prices plummeted.
