= Confederación Ecuatoriana de Organizaciones Clasistas Unitarias de Trabajadores =

Trade union centre in Ecuador

CEDOCUT
- Confederación Ecuatoriana de Organizaciones Clasistas Unitarias de Trabajadores
- Founded: May 15, 1976
- Headquarters: Quito, Ecuador
- Location: Ecuador
- Members: 86,000
- Key people: Mesías Tatamuez Moreno, president
- Website: www.cedocut.org.ec

The Confederación Ecuatoriana de Organizaciones Clasistas Unitarias de Trabajadores (CEDOCUT) is a trade union centre in Ecuador. It has a membership of over 86,000. As of 2006, CEDOCUT organized 92 trade unions, 1.71% of the total number of unions in the country. Its primary base are unions in small and medium-sized companies, farmers and neighbourhood associations.

CEDOCUT was founded on May 15, 1976, after a split from CEDOC. CEDOCUT was legally recognized in October 1988.

CEDOCUT is a member of the Frente Unitario de los Trabajadores, an umbrella organization for Ecuadorian trade unions.
