= Ecua-Andino Hats =

Ecua-Andino
- Industry: Fashion
- Founded: 1985
- Founder: Édgar Sánchez y Alejandro Lecaro
- Headquarters: Guayaquil, Ecuador
- Website: www.ecua-andino.com

Ecua-Andino Hats is an Ecuadorian producer and exporter of Panama hats founded in 1985 by Alejandro Lecaro and Édgar Sánchez.

Ecua-Andino produces hand-woven hats using fibers from the carludovica palmata, also known as toquilla. These natural fibers, found in Central America, are valued for being both soft and durable. The hats are made by over 3,500 artisans across five provinces in Ecuador, with approximately 200,000 exported each year.

== History ==
In 1985, Édgar Sánchez and Alejandro Lecaro started to sell local crafts, initially to tourists on the beach, and then from a small shop in the center of Guayaquil, Ecuador. In 1994, they decided to change the product range and concentrated on hats only. In 2012, UNESCO declared that the art of weaving a Panama hat in Ecuador was added to the list of Intangible Cultural Heritage. Today, the brand exports around 200,000 a year and sells 12,000 on Ecuador's national market.

Sánchez and Lecaro’s daughters joined the business, combining their European education with their Latin American background, which the founders consider important for the brand’s future.

== Production ==
Despite its name, the Panama hat originated in Ecuador. The term became popular after U.S. President Theodore Roosevelt was photographed wearing one during a 1906 visit to the construction site of the Panama Canal. The widespread circulation of the image led to the association of the hat with Panama.

Ecua Andino has straw hats production sites in five provinces of Ecuador such as Canar, Azuay, Guayas, Manabi and Santa Elena. The process involves at least 3500 artisans. It is in these little towns that are done the different processes such as selecting the raw material (Carludovica Palmata), cooking, weaving, bleaching, ironing, etc. Tagging and finishing steps are made in the workshop of Guayaquil. The estimated processing time before exporting a hat varies between 1 month and 6 months, it mostly depends on the quality of the product. The company new collections twice a year:
