= Banking in Ecuador =

Banking in Ecuador has a long history. At the time of the dissolution of Gran Colombia and its formation as a republic, Ecuador's economy was generally not monetized; gold and silver coins were circulated, and were brought into common use by successive currency laws. Little by little, with the growth of the nation, Ecuadorian banking also grew and was particularly centered on the city of Guayaquil. After the Liberal Revolution came a period called the Banking Plutocracy (Plutocracia bancaria) that was dominated by private banking, especially by the Commercial and Agricultural Bank of Guayaquil (Banco Comercial y Agrícola de Guayaquil). This period ended with the July Revolution (Revolución Juliana) of 1925.

In 1998, Ecuador's banks faced the worst financial crisis in the country's history.

== Major banks ==
The major banks today are the Banco Pichincha, Produbanco, Citibank and Banco de Guayaquil.

== See also ==
- Economy of Ecuador
- Central Bank of Ecuador
