= Confederación de Trabajadores del Ecuador =

Trade union centre in Ecuador

CTE
- Confederación de Trabajadores del Ecuador
- Founded: July 9, 1944
- Headquarters: Quito, Ecuador
- Location: Ecuador
- Key people: Edgar Sarango, president
- Affiliations: WFTU
- Website: www.cte.org.ec

The Confederación de Trabajadores del Ecuador ('Ecuadorian Workers Confederation', abbreviated CTE) is a trade union centre in Ecuador. CTE was founded on July 9, 1944, on the initiative of the Communist Party of Ecuador. The organization was awarded legal recognition on March 3, 1945. CTE is affiliated with the World Federation of Trade Unions.

As of 2006, CTE organized 707 trade unions, 13.16% of the total number of unions in the country. Its primary base are unions in the public sector and private-owned factories.

CTE is a member of the Frente Unitario de los Trabajadores, an umbrella organization for Ecuadorian trade unions.
