= Center for Research and Technology Development in Ecuador =

Private research center in Ecuador

The Center for Research and Technology Development in Ecuador is an autonomous center for research and technology development in Ecuador. It is funded by Senecyt. The main works are on the chemical, biological, medical, robotics, astronomy and aerospace fields, and is also working with schools, highschools and universities for learning. Since the beginning of the national space program into the development of this program, it disposes of finanziari Exa own resources and technical and scientific support on this matter. Since its establishment in June 1994, it has become a leader in the design, construction and integration of aircraft systems, aircraft supporting the research, analysis and solution proposals to technological problems.
