= Ecuador Confederation of Free Trade Union Organizations =

CEOSL
- Ecuador Confederation of Free Trade Union Organizations
- Confederación Ecuatoriana de Organizaciones Sindicales Libres
- Founded: 1962
- Headquarters: Quito, Ecuador
- Location: Ecuador
- Key people: Jaime Arciniega Aguirre, president Guillermo Touma, secretary general
- Affiliations: ORIT

The Ecuador Confederation of Free Trade Union Organizations (CEOSL) is a trade union centre in Ecuador. CEOSL was founded on May 1, 1962, inspired by North American trade unions. It later distanced itself from its North American sponsors during the 1980s and 1990s, though. As of 2006 CEOSL organized 984 trade unions, 18.32% of the total number of unions in the country.

CEOSL is a member of the Frente Unitario de los Trabajadores, an umbrella organization for Ecuadorian trade unions.
