= Frente Unitario de los Trabajadores =

Unitary Workers' Front
- Frente Unitario de Trabajadores
- Founded: 1980
- Location: Ecuador
- Members: Confederación Ecuatoriana de Organizaciones Clasistas Unitarias de Trabajadores (CEDOCUT); Confederación Ecuatoriana de Organizaciones Sindicales Libres (CEOSL); Confederación de Trabajadores del Ecuador (CTE); General Union of Ecuadorian Workers (UGTE); Federación Ecuatoriana de Trabajadores Municipales y Provinciales (FETMYP); Unión Nacional de Educadores (UNE); Federación Nacional de Obreros de los Gobiernos Provinciales del Ecuador (FENOGOPRE)

The Frente Unitario de Trabajadores (FUT) is a central organizing body for the main trade union centres in Ecuador.

In 1980, FUT was formed by the unification of Confederación Ecuatoriana de Organizaciones Clasistas Unitarias de Trabajadores (CEDOCUT), Confederación Ecuatoriana de Organizaciones Sindicales Libres (CEOSL), Confederación de Trabajadores del Ecuador (CTE), Unión General de Trabajadores de Ecuador (UGTE) Federación Ecuatoriana de Trabajadores Municipales y Provinciales (FETMYP), Unión Nacional de Educadores (UNE) and Federación Nacional de Obreros de los Gobiernos Provinciales del Ecuador (FENOGOPRE).

The first president of the FUT was Jorge Cuisana.
