= General Union of Ecuadorian Workers =

UGTE
- Unión General de Trabajadores del Ecuador
- Founded: November 20, 1982
- Headquarters: Arenas Oe3-22 y Juan Larrea, Quito
- Location: Ecuador
- Members: 40,000 (claimed)
- Key people: Nelson Erazo, president

The Unión General del Trabajadores de Ecuador ("General Union of Workers of Ecuador", abbreviated UGTE) is a trade union centre in Ecuador. UGTE emerged after a split in CTE. The founding congress of UGTE was held November 20-21, 1982. The founding leader of UGTE was Patricio Aldáz. The organization was awarded legal recognition on September 29, 1994. UGTE is politically linked to the Marxist-Leninist Communist Party of Ecuador and the Democratic People's Movement (MPD), and forms part of the Popular Front (composed of UGTE and student groups, launched as an alternative to the mainstream Frente Unitario de los Trabajadores). UGTE is not affiliated to any international trade union organization.

Nelson Erazo is the president of UGTE. Kléber Alvarado, a labour lawyer, is the vice-president of UGTE.

As of 2006, UGTE organized 76 trade unions, 1.41% of the total number of unions in the country. UGTE claims a membership of around 40,000. It organizes unions in public and private sectors. The main union of UGTE is the National Union of Educators (UNE), which at one point organized some 100,000 teachers across the country.

Ahead of the 2010 Ecuador coup attempt, UGTE voiced opposition to the partial presidential veto on modifications to the proposal for the Public Service Organic Law. UGTE called for protests against the partial presidential veto. UGTE had also threatened to seize the National Assembly by force, in protest against the partial presidential veto. Following the defeat of the coup attempt, UGTE was accused of supporting the conspirators.
