= Produbanco =

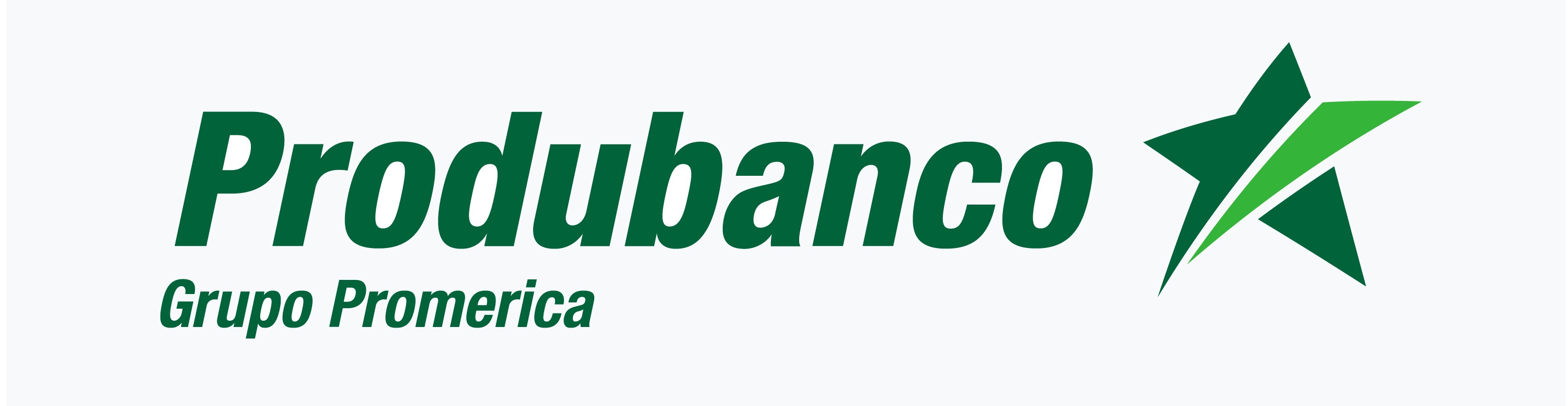
Trademark of the bank

Banco de la Producción S.A., better known as Produbanco, is an Ecuadorian bank. It is the head of the Grupo Financiero Producción. The bank began operations in November 1978.

== See also ==
- Banking in Ecuador
