= Ecuadorian Sumatra Tobacco =

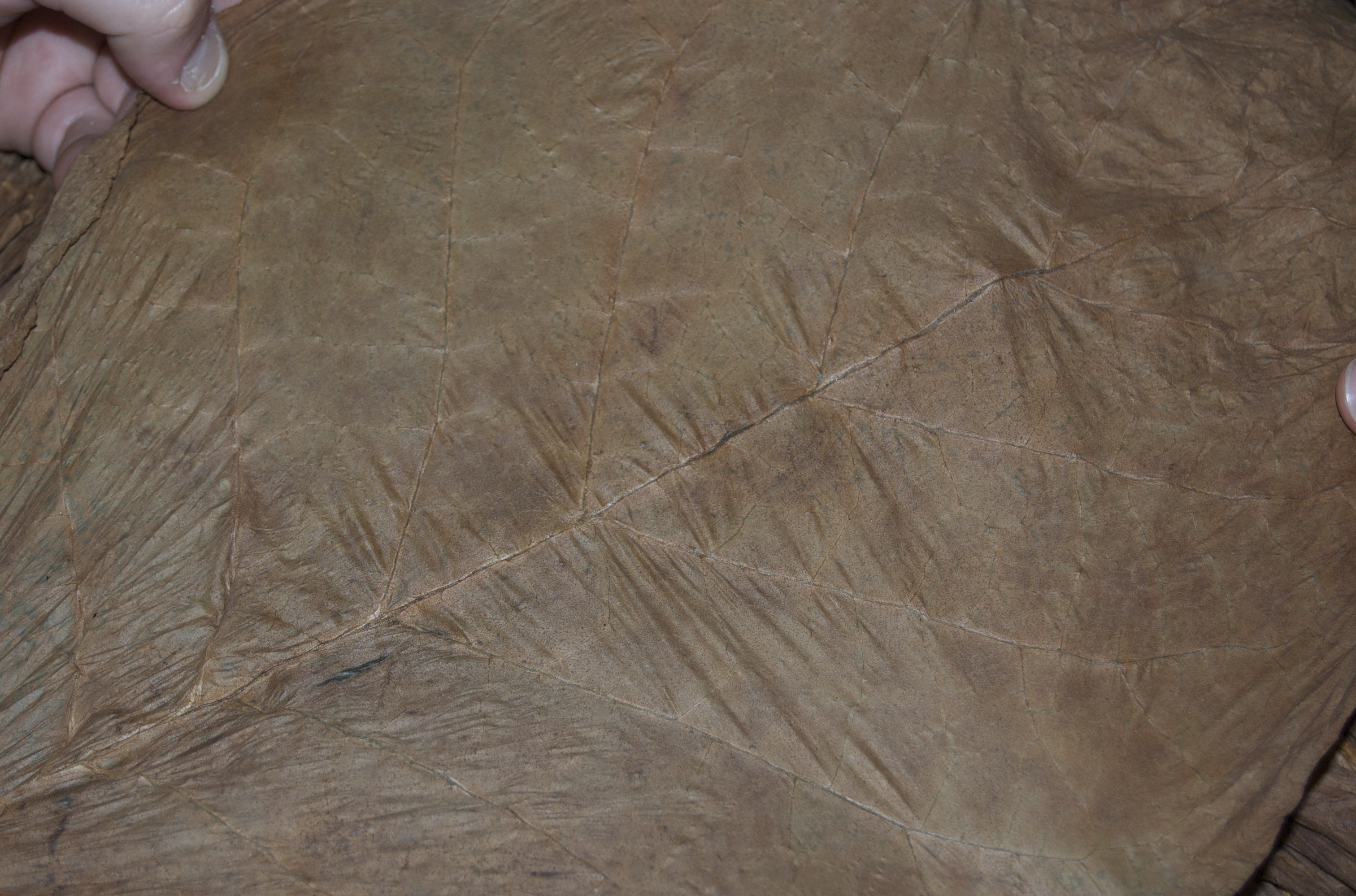
Ecuadorian Sumatra leaf

Ecuadorian Sumatra Tobacco (sometimes spelled Ecuadoran or Ecuadorean) is a tobacco grown in Quevedo, a fertile sub-tropical region in Los Ríos Province, Ecuador, and is used primarily as a wrapper for premium cigars.

== History ==
Since the 1950s, Ecuador's famed Los Rios Province has become one of the most important growing regions for cigar tobacco worldwide.

The area of Los Ríos has been farmed for centuries, but since the late 1950s has it yielded crops tobacco manufacturers would use. Cuban migrant growers looking for better commercial and political environment in which to prosper added tobacco to the traditional crops of bananas, cocoa beans, and coffee.

A farmer named Guillermo de la Portilla met José Aray., the owner of several large agricultural properties in Los Ríos. Mr. Portilla persuaded Mr. Aray to set aside land for tobacco. At hacienda Paulina, Mr. Portilla found the perfect conditions for tobacco and the two men started a business which continues presently through the 2nd and 3rd generations of the Aray family.

Aray and Portilla grew Cubano and Sumatra varieties of tobacco while the American Tobacco Company was growing the Connecticut 711 variety of the Candela tobacco, with Luis Pedreira heading the business until selling it to the Oliva family.

Oliva Tobacco Co., the tobacco farming and brokerage organization from Tampa, Florida, grows much of the Ecuadorian Havana crop for several manufacturers including Altadis, Fuente, and Rocky Patel. Don “Pepin” Garcia uses the fertile soil and climate to grow much of their tobacco in Ecuador.

Manufacturers grew more varieties of tobacco and developed more breeds to fulfill the demands of the American market, citing continuous improvement of the breeds as the driving force. In 1967, Jose Aray successfully crossbred Cubano and Sumatra varieties developing what now is the standard Ecuadoran Sumatra breed, sought after for cigar wrapper leaf worldwide.

The operation is now owned by the Aray family and The Achievement Cigar Company. They continue to grow and develop the Sumatra breed and many other varieties, particularly the Connecticut, Habana 2000, and Criollo 98 breeds, especially for wrappers and fillers.
