= Banco Pichincha =

Ecuadorian financial service company

Banco Pichincha C.A.
- Type: Private
- Industry: financial services
- Founded: 1906 in Quito
- Headquarters: Amazonas Avenue and Pereira St., Banco Pichincha Building, Quito, Pichincha, Ecuador
- Total assets: USD
- Number of employees: (Full-time equivalent, 2011) 100,040
- Website: www.pichincha.com

The Banco Pichincha is the largest private-sector bank in Ecuador, by capitalization and by number of depositors. It is the primary bank of the Pichincha Group (Grupo Pichincha), a business group that includes the companies associated with the bank and businesses related to Fidel Egas Grijalva and his family, which include Diners Club of Ecuador, Picaval and Teleamazonas.

As of 2022, the bank has 1.8 million customers in Ecuador, $15.5 billion in assets, $10.5 billion in gross loans and $12.3 billion in deposits, as well as more than 200 branches in the country. Banco Pichincha has a subsidiary in Peru, Banco Financiero Perú, in Colombia, Banco Pichincha (before known as "Inversora Pichincha" and "Banco del Pichincha", and another in Panama, Banco Pichincha Panamá. It also has an agency in Miami, and eight representative offices in Spain, including two each in Madrid, Barcelona, Murcia, and Comunidad Valenciana. It has just received regulatory approval to convert its network of offices in Spain into a commercial bank, the first Spanish commercial bank from Latin America. It has applied to the regulators in Colombia for permission to convert its commercial lending operation in that country, Inversora Pichincha, into a commercial bank.

== Systems ==
The bank's electronic transactions are done using the INTERNEXO system, which replaced the TODO1 system. In January 2007, the bank signed a $140 million, 5-year contract with Tata Consultancy Services for modernizing its information systems and improving efficiency. As a part of this agreement, Tata hired most of Banco Pichincha's systems staff.

== History ==
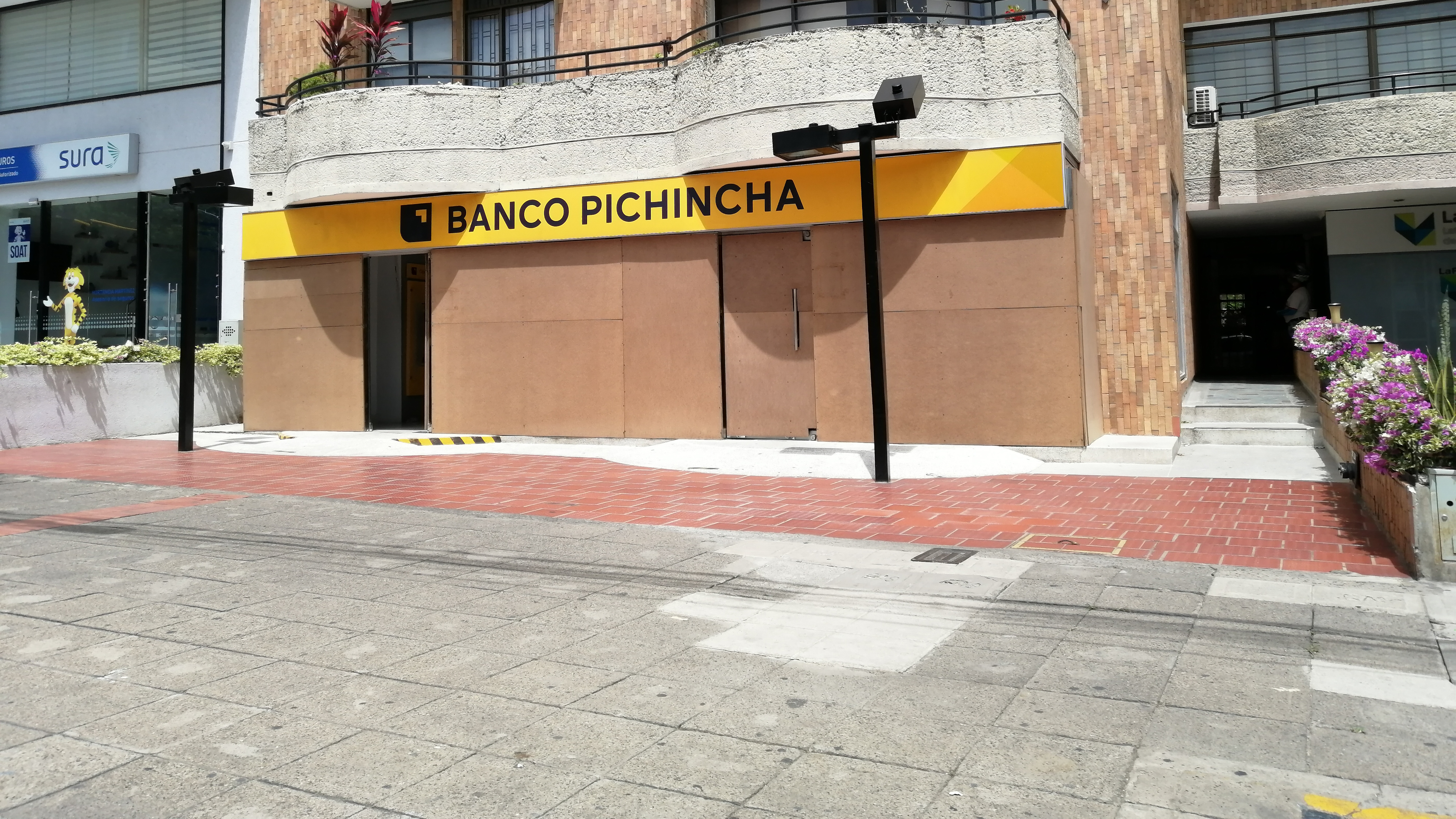
Banco Pichincha

Banco Pichincha was established on 11 April 1906. Its first directors were Manuel Jijón Larrea (founding president), Manuel Freile Donoso and Ignacio Fernández Salvador (founding managers). Although it was a bank of note issue (the first issue, for one million sucres, took place in February 1907), it focused on stockbroking.

In 1986, the bank established an agency in Miami, Florida.

Since 1996, the bank has had a strategic alliance with Banco de Loja (est. 1967), to provide Banco Pichincha's clients coverage in southern Ecuador.

The next year, it acquired Banco Financiero de Perú, which had been established in 1964 as a company specializing in construction financing, but which had become a full commercial bank in 1982. In 2001, Banco Financiero acquired NBK Bank, in Peru.

In 2004, the bank established Banco Pichincha Panamá, which initially was based in Nassau, in the Bahamas, but which moved its head office to Panama.

In 2001, ABN AMRO sold the Ecuadorian operation it had inherited from its acquisition of Hollandsche Bank-Unie to Banco Pichincha.

Pichincha first arrived in Spain in 2007, where it now operates a network of nine customer-service centers mainly focused on attending to the more than 750,000 Ecuadorians who live in Spain. In 2010 it received permission from Banco de España to establish a commercial bank. Pichincha plans to convert its customer service centers to branches, commencing with those in Madrid, and eventually to open another 20 branches over the next four years.

In 2009, Pichincha acquired AIG's operations in Colombia. These included the commercial lender, Inversora Pichincha.

== See also ==
- Banking in Ecuador
