= Andrea Arrobo =

Ecuadorian politician (born c. 1991)

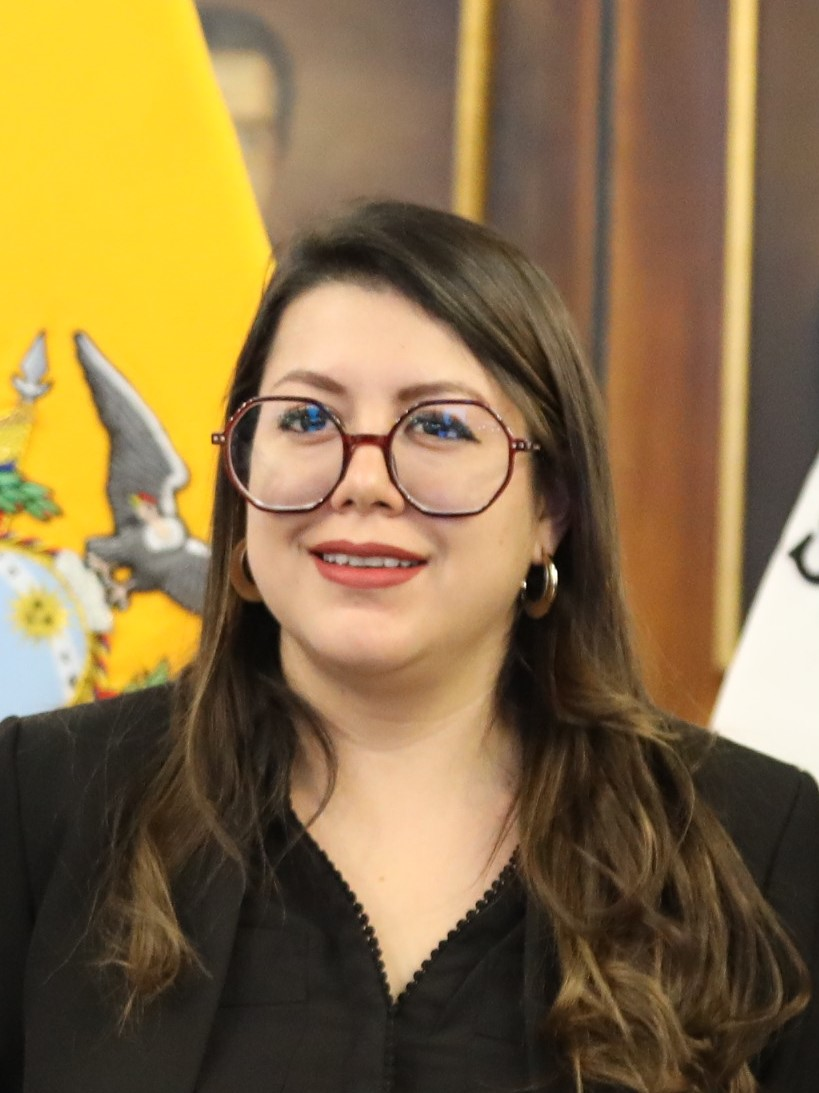
- Born: c. 1991
- Education: Universidad de los Hemisferios
- Occupations: politician and minister
- Known for: Minister of Energy in 2023/24
- Successor: Roberto Luque

Andrea Arrobo Peña (born c.1991) is an Ecuadorian who became her country's minister of energy in 2023. She had to resign the following year in the light of continuing blackouts.

== Life ==
Arrobo was born in about 1991. She attended the Universidad de los Hemisferios. It is a small university in Quito established in 2004. She studied International Relations before she went to Spain to obtain her master's degree from the University of Barcelona.

In 2012 she began her career at Ecuador's Ministry of Electricity and Renewable Energy. She gained expertise particularly in the use of hydrogen as a fuel working for a French company.

After the Presidential election of 2023, Daniel Noboa became the country's youngest ever President. He had already named Arrobo as the prospective energy minister. Noboa was appointed with a large number of his ministers in November 2023. Arrobo was appointed Minister of Energy and Mines on 12 December 2023. She was the first woman to hold this position in Ecuador. At the time of her appointment there was already problems as the country's hydro-electric plants were not creating enough power and this resulted in electricity blackouts.

In the following April the blackouts were still continuing and a new set of blackouts was announced. Noboa asked for her resignation on 16 April. She was the second minister to resign as Ana Changuín had resigned the previous month. He demanded an investigation into alleged sabotage at some of the hydro-electric plants and he declared an energy emergency.

Her successor Roberto Luque accused her, and her former team, of hiding crucial information.
