= Citibank Ecuador =

- Type: Public
- Industry: financial services
- Founded: 1960
- Headquarters: Quito, Ecuador
- Total assets: USD
- Website: www.citi.com.ec

Citibank Ecuador (Spanish: Citibank, N. A. Sucursal Ecuador) is a unit of Citigroup of New York City, with its roots in Ecuador dating back to 1960. Citi Ecuador is headquartered in Quito, with offices in Guayaquil.

Citi's agencies are located in:

- Quito
  - República de El Salvador N36-230 y Naciones Unidas. Edificio Citiplaza (Headquarters)
- Guayaquil
  - Av. Constitución y Juan Tanca Marengo. Edificio Executive Center (Offices)
