= Alfredo Palacio Moreno =

Ecuadorian sculptor and painter

Alfredo Palacio Moreno (Loja, August 9, 1912 – Guayaquil, April 20, 1998) was an Ecuadorian sculptor and painter.

He was the director of the Municipal School of Fine Arts in Guayaquil for 32 years. He was the father of the former Ecuadorian President Alfredo Palacio González (in office 2005-2007) and son of Manuel Belisario Moreno, who was known for writing the novel Naya o La Chapetona.

He was awarded the national prize Premio Eugenio Espejo for his art in 1993 by the president of Ecuador.

His work includes the sculpture of Eloy Alfaro seated on a horse, which now stands on the National Unity Bridge in Guayaquil.
