= Bermeo (disambiguation) =

Bermeo may refer to:

- Bermeo, a town and municipality in Spain.
- Bermeo FT, a Spanish football team.
- Nancy Bermeo, an American political scientist.
- Luis Rodolfo Peñaherrera Bermeo (1936–2016), an Ecuadorian artist.
