= Luis Rodolfo Peñaherrera Bermeo =

- Born: 1936
- Died: 2016 (aged 79–80)
- Education: Meritorious Philanthropic Society of Guayas, Fine Arts teaching degree from the Municipal School of Arts in Guayaquil
- Known for: Painting
- Notable work: the mural "Apotheosis of Guayaquil" on the ceiling of the City Hall
- Awards: 1974 - First Prize - October Hall, House of Ecuadorian Culture, Guayaquil, Ecuador.

Luis Rodolfo Peñaherrera Bermeo (c. 1936 – 20 August 2016) was an Ecuadorian artist.

He studied lithography and drawing from the Meritorious Philanthropic Society of Guayas, and earned a Fine Arts teaching degree from the Municipal School of Arts in Guayaquil. He became a professor at both institutions, and the rector of the latter for 33 years. During his time as a student, some of his teachers included Alfredo Palacio, Caesar Andrade Faini, and Hans Michaelson. Additionally, some of his own students such as Jorge Velarde went on to become noted painters.

He painted the mural "Apotheosis of Guayaquil" on the ceiling of the City Hall, which portrays past and present iconic figures from Guayaquilean history. Another of his notable murals "Battle of Pichincha" is at the Carondelet Palace in Quito.

At the age of 23 he took over the drawing of the cartoon character named "Juan Pablo" (created in 1918 by Jaime Salinas), which was the most popular cartoon character in Guayaquil, having first appeared in El Telégrafo, and later in La Prensa and El Universo, which in 1994 was also recognized as "a civic emblem" by the municipal government. When Salinas died in 1959, El Telégrafo launched a contest to find someone who would take over the drawing of Juan Pablo, which Peñaherrera Bermeo won. From 1962 to 1998 he drew a cartoon called "Flechazos" for the newspaper El Universo under the pseudonym Robin. He has also used the pseudonym Sombras at El Telégrafo.

== Prizes ==
- 1974 - First Prize - October Hall, House of Ecuadorian Culture, Guayaquil, Ecuador.
