= Emilio Palacio =

Ecuadorian journalist (born c.1954)

Emilio Palacio (born c. 1954) is an Ecuadorian journalist. Palacio was granted political asylum in the United States in 2012. He is the half-brother of the late former president of Ecuador Alfredo Palacio (born 1939 - died 2025).

== Biography ==
=== Youth and education ===
Palacio was born in Guayaquil into a middle-class family.

=== Career ===
Palacio was the opinion editor of the Ecuadorian newspaper El Universo. In 2005, Palacio chided Rafael Correa, then Ecuador's finance minister, in print for crudely rejecting a successful currency plan. Correa responded by calling Palacio a traitor. Their feud escalated during a case related to unrest in September 2010, when Correa, now president, was trapped inside a hospital for several hours by police officers. Correa described the circumstances as an "attempted coup". In an opinion article from 6 February 2011 which appeared in El Universo ("No to Lies"), Palacio alleged that the president had ordered soldiers to fire on the hospital, which was full of civilians. The following month, Correa announced a lawsuit against the editorial writer and the directors of the paper. Correa alleged that several of Palacio's editorials were "accusations" and "slander", where Palacio stated Correa had "...ordered fire at will and without warning against a hospital full of civilians and innocent people..." In an official El Universo editorial it was explicitly said that he committed crimes against humanity reasons for which Palacio was sued. El Universo says the president’s suit was announced several hours after the newspaper published an article about an information access request denial. While Palacio claimed, he was sued for calling Correa a "Dictator".

"We are not only suing the editorial writer, but also the newspaper El Universo’s directors,” said Correa, in a radio interview on Ecuadorinmediato, quoted by El Universo. According to an editorial published by The Washington Post on 27 July 2011:

Last week the president personally attended the trial while thuggish supporters threw eggs and bottles at the defendants outside the courthouse. To no one’s surprise, the provisional judge hearing the case quickly ruled in the president’s favor, sentencing Mr. Palacio and the three El Universo directors to three years in prison and awarding $40 million in damages to Mr. Correa – an amount that exceeds the total value of the newspaper.

Palacio and the three executives of the newspaper that published the article were sentenced to three years in prison and a fine of 40 million dollars, payable to Correa himself. On October 31, 2011, Human Rights Foundation (HRF) sent a letter to the National Court of Justice of Ecuador, asking them to overturn the decision, described as "abhorrent" by HRF president Thor Halvorssen.

On 24 August 2011, Palacio fled Ecuador to avoid incarceration and currently resides in the United States where in the following year he was granted political asylum.

As of 16 February 2012, the National Court of Justice (Ecuador's highest court) confirmed the lower court's award of $40 million in damages, as well as the three-year prison sentences against a journalist and three executives.

By the end of February 2012, Emilio Palacio and El Universo were released from their charges and no other cause is currently active in the case, which implies there is no reason for Palacio to avoid returning to Ecuador.
