= Anne Malherbe =

First Lady of Ecuador (born 1968)

Anne Malherbe Gosselin
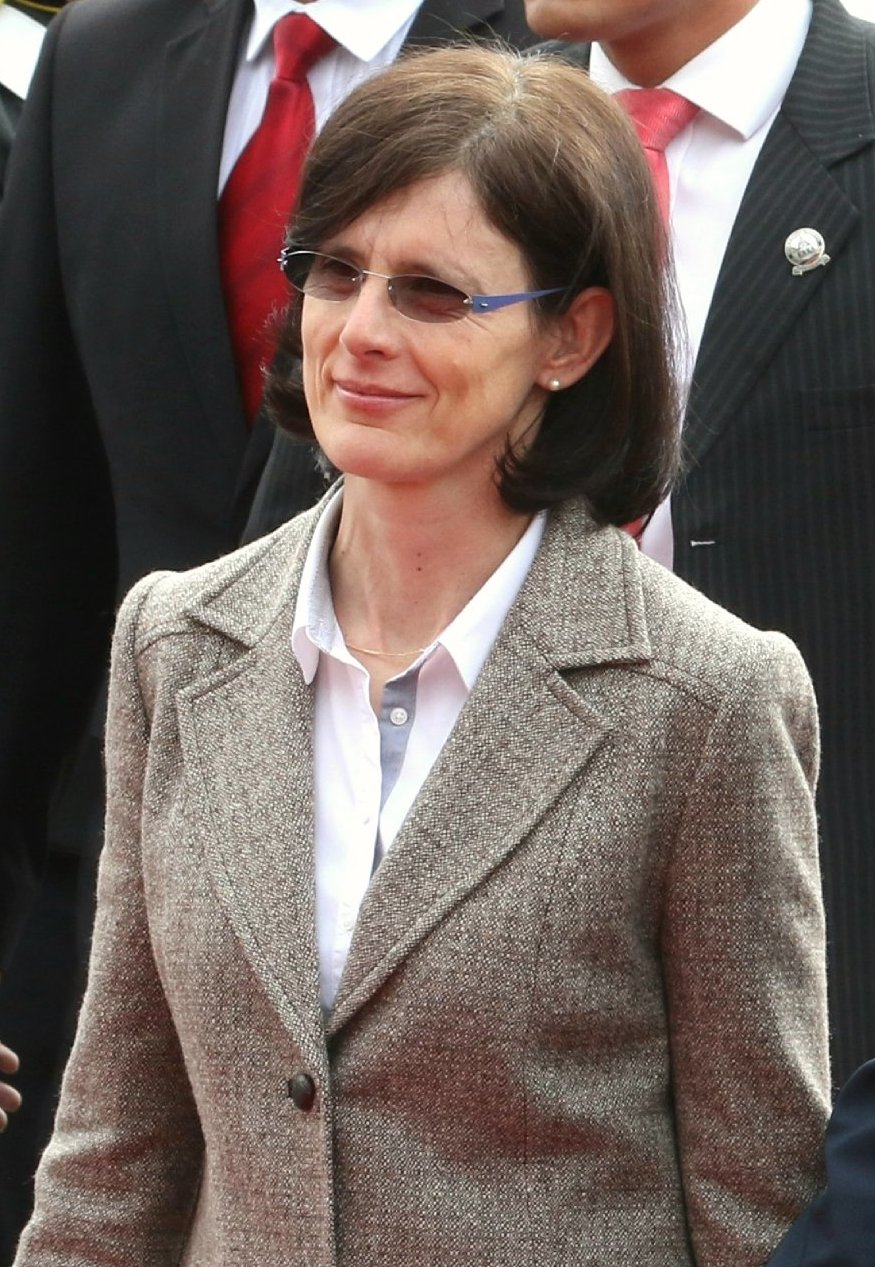
- Malherbe Gosselin in 2017

First Lady of Ecuador
- In role January 15, 2007 – May 24, 2017
- President: Rafael Correa
- Preceded by: María Beatriz Paret
- Succeeded by: Rocío González Navas

Personal details
- Born: Anne Malherbe; December 16, 1968 (age 57) Namur, Belgium
- Spouse: Rafael Correa (m. 1992)
- Children: Sofía; Anne Dominique; Rafael Miguel
- Education: University of Louvain
- Occupation: Teacher

Anne Malherbe Gosselin (born Anne Malherbe on December 16, 1968) is a Belgian-Ecuadorian teacher who served as First Lady of Ecuador from 15 January 2007 to 24 May 2017, as the wife of Ecuadorian President Rafael Correa.

== Biography ==
She was born in Namur, Belgium, and is the daughter of Paul Malherbe (1936-2019) and Chantal Gosselin (1940-2018). She met Correa while both were attending courses in the University of Louvain (UCLouvain) in Belgium. They later married and, during Correa's presidency, moved to Ecuador. After the end of Correa's presidency, the couple moved to Belgium.

Owing to her and Correa's beliefs that "there should not be a first lady, as all citizens, men and women, are the same" in a socialist society, Malherbe was never presented or referred to as First Lady of Ecuador. The duties of the First Lady were at first transferred to the Patronato San José, and subsequently to the Ministry of Social Inclusion.

== Public statements ==
After Correa's inauguration, Malherbe opted to keep a low public profile. During her first weeks in office, she stated that "we, women are all equal", asserting the value of women as individual persons rather than through the position of their husbands.

Her only notable public appearance while in office was on 31 July 2007, when she was interviewed by EFE and referred to the case of Ecuadorian child Angélica Loja Cajamarca, who had been detained at a migrant center in Belgium with her mother for not carrying a photo ID. Malherbe expressed shame and disgust at what her home country had done to Cajamarca, who was eleven years old at the time. She made no further appearances after this.

Honorary titles
Preceded by María Beatriz Paret	First Lady of Ecuador; 2007–2017	Succeeded by Rocío González Navas
