= Alfredo Palacio =

President of Ecuador from 2005 to 2007

Alfredo Palacio OSP
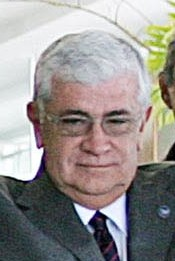
- Palacio in 2005

44th President of Ecuador
- In office 20 April 2005 – 15 January 2007
- Vice President: Alejandro Serrano
- Preceded by: Lucio Gutiérrez
- Succeeded by: Rafael Correa

44th Vice President of Ecuador
- In office 15 January 2003 – 20 April 2005
- President: Lucio Gutiérrez
- Preceded by: Pedro Pinto Rubianes
- Succeeded by: Alejandro Serrano

Minister of Health
- In office 11 November 1994 – 10 August 1996
- President: Sixto Durán Ballén
- Preceded by: Patricio Abad
- Succeeded by: Marcelo Cruz

Personal details
- Born: Luis Alfredo Palacio González; 22 January 1939 Guayaquil, Ecuador
- Died: 22 May 2025 (aged 86) Guayaquil, Ecuador
- Party: Independent
- Spouse: María Beatriz Paret
- Parent: Alfredo Palacio Moreno (father)
- Education: Case Western Reserve University
- Medical career
- Profession: Physician
- Field: Cardiology
- Institutions: University of Guayaquil
- Awards: Order of the Sun of Peru (Grand Cross)

Luis Alfredo Palacio González (22 January 1939 – 22 May 2025) was an Ecuadorian cardiologist and politician who was the 44th president of Ecuador from 2005 to 2007. He had been the 44th vice president under President Lucio Gutiérrez, until he was appointed to the presidency when the Ecuadorian Congress removed Gutiérrez from power following a week of growing unrest with his government. He previously served as Minister of Health between 1994 and 1996.

== Early life and medical career ==
Palacio was born in Guayaquil on 22 January 1939, the son of sculptor Alfredo Palacio Moreno and Ana María González. He grew up in a leftist family. His paternal grandfather was the writer Manuel Belisario Moreno.

He completed his primary and secondary education at the Abdón Calderón School and the San José La Salle School in his native Guayaquil. Palacio later obtained a PhD in Medicine and Surgery at the University of Guayaquil in 1967. He then moved to the United States, where he lived from 1969 to 1972, and did his medical residency at Case Western Reserve University and completed a fellowship in cardiology at Barnes-Jewish Hospital, affiliated to the Washington University School of Medicine in St. Louis. Palacio worked at Mount Sinai Hospital in Cleveland, Ohio; the Veterans Affairs Medical Center in Missouri and Barnes-Jewish Hospital in St. Louis, Missouri. As a student in Guayaquil, Palacio participated with the Federation of University Students of Ecuador (FEUE) in protests against the government of José María Velasco Ibarra and the Military Junta.

During his professional practice, he was a member of the New York Academy of Sciences, the Editorial Committee of the Spanish Journal Ultrasonidos, the Ecuadorian Scientific Community, the Medical-Surgical Society of the province of Guayas, the Ecuadorian Society of Cardiology, and the Specialist Societies of Thorax, Paediatrics, Radiology and Internal Medicine.

Back in Guayaquil, he worked as a private cardiologist and among his clients included León Febres Cordero, Sixto Durán Ballén and Abdalá Bucaram. In 1980 he founded the Instituto Nacional de Cardiología Alfredo Palacio (INCAP) in Guayaquil. Palacio participated in numerous national and international medical congresses, and publicated a large number of research papers on heart diseases. In 1981 published in Mexico an atlas on two-dimensional echocardiography.

In 1989 he began to teach cardiology at the Faculty of Medicine of the University of Guayaquil and became member of the Ecuadorian Academy of Medicine.

== Political career ==
In 1992, newly elected president of Ecuador Sixto Durán Ballén appointed him head of one of the regional directorates of the Ecuadorian Social Security Institute (IESS). Palacio also served as vice-president of the National Council for Science and Technology (CONACYT) until April 1994 when the body was dismantled as a result of the government's reorganisation of the National Science and Technology System (SNCT). He never joined any political party, but has been associated with liberal and progressive ideologies.

=== Minister of Health (1994–1996) ===
On 9 November of that year, President Durán appointed Palacio as the new Minister of Public Health, succeeding Patricio Abad, who resigned days earlier under threat of impeachment in Congress for malfeasance in office. He took office on 11 November.

During his tenure as Minister of Health, Palacio had to confront the health crisis in the country with major outbreaks of malaria, chicken pox and cholera, especially in the most vulnerable areas of Ecuador. During the Cenepa War (1995), Palacio led the organisation of the emergency health system, which earned him special recognition from the Armed Forces. He opposed the privatisation of the Ecuadorian health system.

In October 1995, a terrorist attack against Palacio was thwarted when the police detected an explosive device in the basement of the Technical Sub-Directorate of Health in Quito, where Palacio was about to preside over an event at the US Embassy.

=== Vice President of Ecuador (2003–2005) ===
Palacio was chosen as Lucio Gutiérrez's running mate in the 2002 general election in the Patriotic Society Party's candidacy to the presidency.

During the election campaign, Palacio was seen wearing a doctor's uniform, as opposed to Gutiérrez, who wore in military uniform. He also stated that he would not join any party even if he were elected vice-president.

The Gutiérrez-Palacio ticket won the presidential election in the second round on 24 November. Palacio was sworn in as Vice President of Ecuador on 15 January 2003.

Disagreements between Palacio and Gutiérrez soon became apparent. Even before taking office, there were doubts in Gutiérrez's entourage as to whether Palacio would assume responsibility for the social sector, as he had promised in his campaign. Palacio was only given the opportunity to decide on the head of the Ministry of Health. The main reason for the clash between the two was the shift to the right that Gutiérrez had made, while Palacio wanted to fulfil the progressive promises announced in the election campaign. Palacio also proposed the creation of a universal health insurance programme, but blamed its failure on a boycott by the government itself. Tensions between the two leaders increased in December 2003 and it was even said that Gutiérrez asked him to resign. This clash was accompanied by a deterioration in relations between Gutiérrez and the traditional political class, while Palacio maintained a good relationship with the Christian Social Party (PSC) and the Democratic Left (ID).

In mid-2004, Palacio distanced himself from Gutiérrez in the face of a crisis in the government and in Petroecuador due to the resignations of high-ranking officials in the face of strong social opposition to Gutiérrez's measure to request approval for the exploitation of four large oil fields by foreign companies. Palacio took the decision to boycott all public events until Gutiérrez would rethink another economic and social model.

== Presidency (2005–2007) ==
- Alfredo Palacio; 20 April 2005 – 15 January 2007
- Vice President: Alejandro Serrano (2005–2007)
- Seat: Carondelet Palace

Ecuador was experiencing a serious political and social crisis provoked by a general disenchantment with Gutiérrez's policies. On 8 December 2004, Gutiérrez proposed a drastic overhaul of the Supreme Court, in which most judges would be removed and replaced by more pro-government ones. This move was considered unconstitutional and the opposition accused Gutiérrez of embarking on an "authoritarian" drift and of implementing this reform to facilitate the acquittal of former president Abdalá Bucaram, who fled the country accused in several corruption cases.

This case, dubbed the "Pichi Corte scandal", sparked widespread protests in Quito in February 2005. Two ministers resigned in early March and on 15 April Gutiérrez decreed a state of emergency in Quito after protests escalated. Palacio called on Gutiérrez to revoke a "dictatorial decree that this dignified and democratic people will never tolerate".

The police repression of a protest in Quito on 19 April resulted in numerous injuries and one death. Palacio protested vehemently, stating that "the people cannot shoot at the people (...) Gutiérrez cannot evade his responsibility (...) he must listen to the people (...) The country is falling apart". He also denounced the existence of a "diabolical plan orchestrated to disrupt the institutions".

The following day, the deputies, meeting in emergency session at the International Centre for Higher Communication Studies for Latin America (CIESPAL) because the National Congress building had been surrounded and assaulted by demonstrators, removed Lucio Gutiérrez as President of Ecuador. Minutes after, the Armed Forces announced the withdrawal of their support to Gutiérrez. Shortly after, Palacio was sworn in as president by acting president of the Congress Cynthia Viteri and declared that "the people of Ecuador, particularly those of Quito, today put an end to dictatorship, immorality, arrogance, terror, and fear. [...] The people today have decided to refound the Republic, a Republic of hope, in whose streets, in whose green fields, and on whose paths dignity, hope, equity, and joy flourish and reign." The first measure he immediately took was to order the closure of the country's borders to prevent the escape of several politicians, including Gutiérrez. When a mob of protesters stormed the CIESPAL building demanding the dissolution of Congress and resignations, Palacio and some legislators took refuge on the upper floors, barricaded in the offices. Palacio attempted to speak with the protesters. At dusk, Palacio was able to leave the building and headed to the Ministry of Defense, where he held a press conference. In the early hours of 21 April, Palacio was able to enter the Palacio de Carondelet, the seat of government. There, he announced that he would not dissolve Congress and that he planned to convene a Constitutional Assembly to review the 1998 Constitution; he proposed a reform of the Election Law, ruled out early presidential elections, announced the revision of oil contracts and presented a technocratic government. The following day, the new government was sworn in.

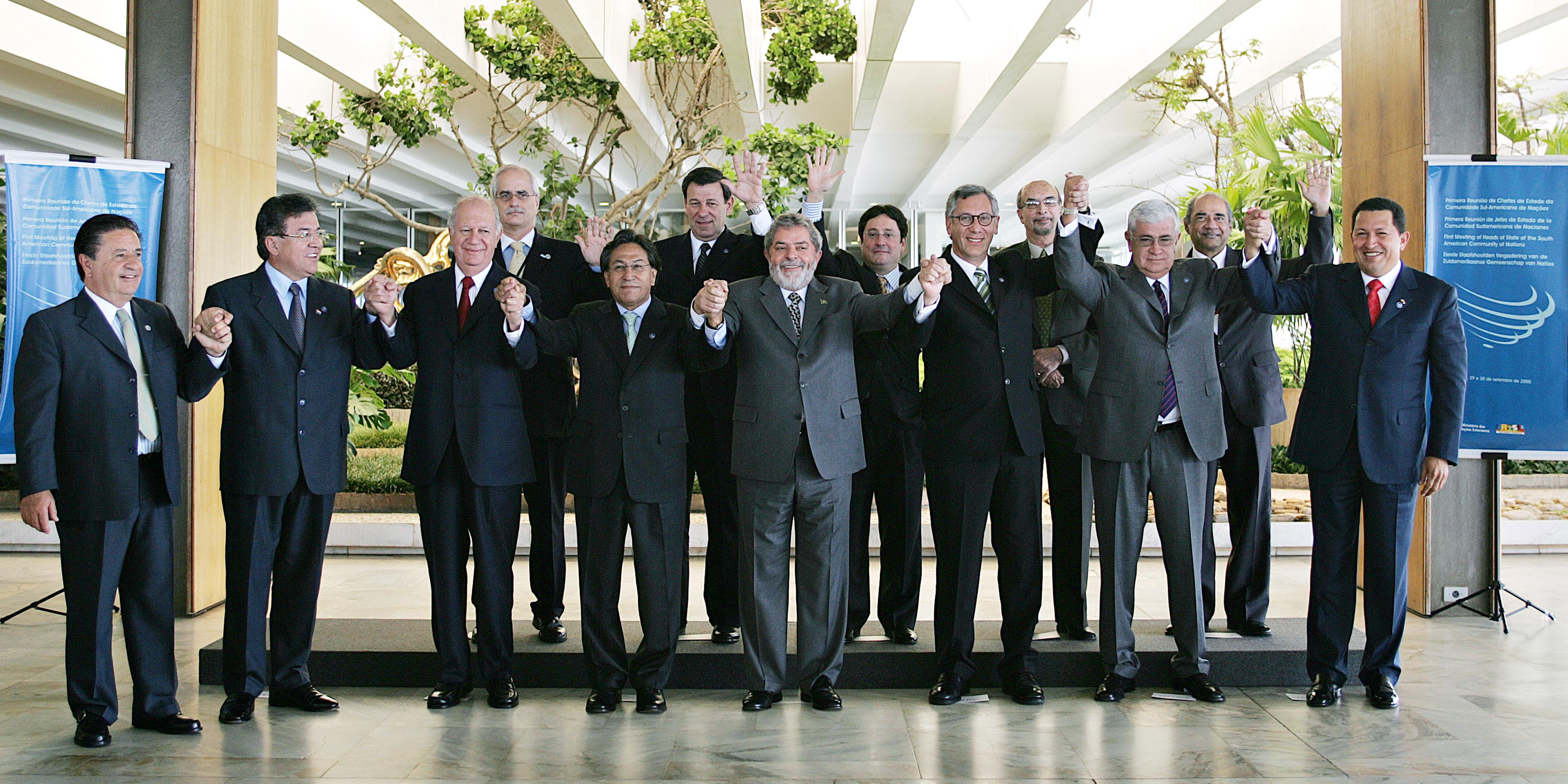
Palacio (second from right) at the first meeting of Heads of State of the South American Community of Nations, 30 September 2005

From the beginning of his term, he was unable to count on the support of any political party and governed against the constant opposition of the main political forces.

On 29 April 2005, in his first official speech at the Parcayacu Military School, Palacio announced the restoration of institutionality, constitutional reforms, decentralization and autonomy processes, and the payment of the social debt as his government's main priorities.

On 5 May 2005 the National Congress appointed Alejandro Serrano as the new Vice President of Ecuador at Palacio's proposal.

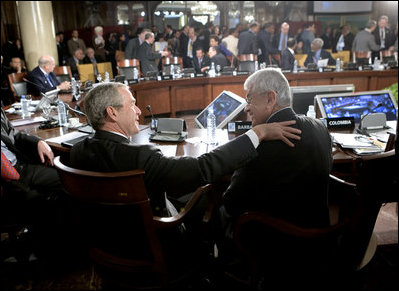
Palacio with United States president George W. Bush, 5 November 2005

In June 2005, sent to Congress a legal reform for the appointment of Supreme Court judges, which was called "The Ideal Court," and a legal reform to change the way presidents of the Republic are judged.

In August 2005, his Minister of Economy, Rafael Correa, resigned. He had proposed economic measures that clashed with Palacio, such as the proposal to eliminate the FEIREP (Petroleum Stabilization Fund) and replace it with the CEREPS, which was intended for public services; opposed the conditions imposed by the International Monetary Fund (IMF) and the World Bank and maintained a discourse against foreign debt and defending the country's economic sovereignty. Correa ultimately won the 2006 presidential election and succeeded Palacio as Ecuador's president on 15 January 2007.

In foreign policy, Palacio was critical of Colombia. He asked the president Álvaro Uribe to detain the fumigaciones in the border zone derived from Plan Colombia, of which he was critical and did not want to make Ecuador as a participant. This caused a distance from the United States government.

On 10 August 2006 Palacio proposed a referendum with 15 questions. However, this was rejected by the National Assembly, as some proposals involved constitutional changes that required parliamentary approval. On 25 September Palacio issued decree 1871 putting forward three proposals to a referendum. This was approved by the Supreme Electoral Tribunal on 4 October, which also set the date of the referendum for 26 November 2006, alongside the run-off for the presidential elections.

Palacio began his presidency with an approval rating of 53%. He left office with a 29% approval rating, according to a CEDATOS survey.

During his final weeks as president, Palacio was one of the candidates for the position of director-general of the World Health Organization. However before the election was held, he announced he would not be pursuing the position, preferring to concentrate on his presidency until the last day of his mandate.

After his brief stint in power, he returned to his hometown of Guayaquil, where he was no longer involved in politics and resumed his profession as a cardiologist. He founded the Faculty of Medicine of the Universidad de Especialidades Espíritu Santo (UEES), where he worked as a teacher and lecturer, and also presided the National Institute of Cardiology.

== Personal life ==
His wife was María Beatriz Paret, with whom he had four children.

Palacio died in Guayaquil on 22 May 2025, at the age of 86. The Government of Ecuador declared a two-day national mourning period. The funeral took place on 22 May in the cemetery of Parque de la Paz in the city of Daule, where Palacio was buried the following day.

== Honors ==
- Grand Cross of the Order of the Sun of Peru (2008).
- National Order of Merit (Ecuador)
- Medal for Atahualpa Merit in the rank of Commander (Ecuador)

== See also ==
- List of Case Western people
- Cesar Palacio, his cousin and a Toronto City Councillor
- Emilio Palacio, his brother and a persecuted journalist

Political offices
Preceded by Pedro Pinto Rubianes	Vice President of Ecuador; 15 January 2003 – 20 April 2005	Succeeded by Alejandro Serrano Aguilar
Preceded by Lucio Gutiérrez	President of Ecuador; 20 April 2005 – 15 January 2007	Succeeded by Rafael Correa
