= Guillermo Lasso =

President of Ecuador from 2021 to 2023

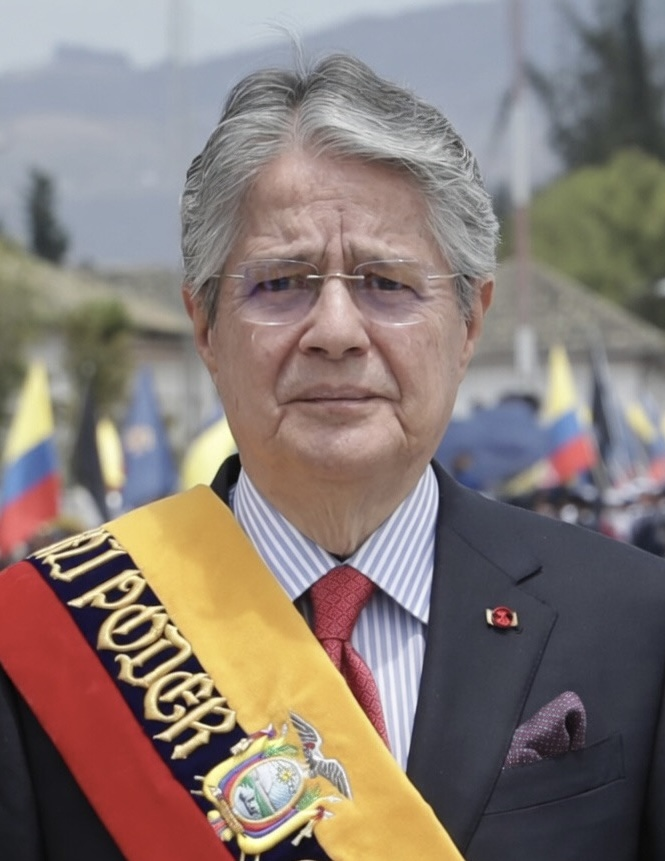
- Lasso in 2022

47th President of Ecuador
- In office 24 May 2021 – 23 November 2023
- Vice President: Alfredo Borrero
- Preceded by: Lenín Moreno
- Succeeded by: Daniel Noboa

Ecuadorian Itinerant Ambassador
- In office 15 January 2003 – 15 April 2003
- President: Lucio Gutiérrez
- Preceded by: Office established
- Succeeded by: Office abolished

Minister of the Economy
- In office 17 August 1999 – 24 September 1999 Serving with Ana Lucía Armijos
- President: Jamil Mahuad
- Preceded by: Position established
- Succeeded by: Position abolished

Governor of Guayas
- In office 10 August 1998 – 17 August 1999
- President: Jamil Mahuad
- Preceded by: Guido Chiriboga Parra
- Succeeded by: Benjamín Rosales

Personal details
- Born: Guillermo Alberto Santiago Lasso Mendoza; 16 November 1955 (age 70) Guayaquil, Ecuador
- Party: Creating Opportunities
- Spouse: María de Lourdes Alcívar (m. 1980)
- Children: 5
- Education: Pontifical Catholic University of Ecuador (dropped out)
- Website: Official website

Guillermo Alberto Santiago Lasso Mendoza (Latin American Spanish: [ɡiˈʝeɾmo ˈlaso]; born 16 November 1955) is an Ecuadorian businessman, banker and politician who served as the 47th president of Ecuador from 2021 to 2023.

Lasso served as Superminister of Economy during the Jamil Mahuad presidency briefly in 1999. He previously served as Governor of Guayas from 1998 to 1999. In 2003, he briefly served as the Itinerant Ambassador of Ecuador during the Lucio Gutiérrez administration. Aside from his political career, Lasso is also a banker and previously was CEO of Banco Guayaquil. During the presidency of Rafael Correa, Lasso became a noted critic of his administration.

A traditional economic liberal, his public agenda includes classical liberal points such as the defence of the division of powers to limit government and of fundamental rights. He has also expressed opinions in favour of lower taxes and is a free-market advocate. Lasso became involved in presidential politics when he founded the Creating Opportunities Party in 2012. He first ran for president in 2013 where he came in a distant second place behind President Correa. He would later run again in the 2017 election, advancing to the run-off, running against former vice president Lenín Moreno, and narrowly losing the election. In his third presidential campaign in 2021, Lasso narrowly advanced to the April run-off round of the election in February and was later elected. Impeachment proceedings against him began later that year over information revealed in the Panama Papers.

Lasso's presidency was noted for COVID-19 vaccination initiatives and economic relief packages through tax increases on the wealthy and funding with the International Monetary Fund. However, the increase of food and fuel prices, as well as his economic policies, culminated in a series of protests across the country. The government's response raised concerns over human rights abuses, with crackdowns on indigenous protests at the hands of security forces, as well as alleged excessive force against journalists. Lasso's approval rating dropped significantly throughout 2022 and in 2023.

In May 2023, the National Assembly officially began a second impeachment proceeding against Lasso. On 17 May, Lasso dissolved the National Assembly by invoking a constitutional measure known as muerte cruzada, triggering the 2023 general election, in which he did not run and was succeeded by Daniel Noboa.

== Early life ==
Lasso was born in the Orellana neighborhood of Guayaquil to a middle-class family on 16 November 1955. His parents were Enrique Lasso Alvarado and Nora Mendoza. Lasso has ten siblings and his family lived with financial hardships. At age 15, Lasso worked to earn sufficient money to pay for his baccalaureate service at Colegio La Salle High School. After graduating from high school, he entered the Pontifical Catholic University of Ecuador in Quito to study economics but left without a degree.

In 1970, Lasso began working part-time at the Guayaquil Stock Exchange and later worked as a collection agency assistant at Casa Möeller Martínez. In 1972, he started working at the financial company Cofiec and then at Finansa in Quito. His first company was Constructora Alfa y Omega, founded with his older brother Enrique Lasso in 1978, when he was 23 years old.

In 1977, Lasso met María de Lourdes Alcívar, whom he married in 1980. They have five children: María de Lourdes, Juan, Guillermo Enrique, Santiago and María de las Mercedes.

== Business career ==
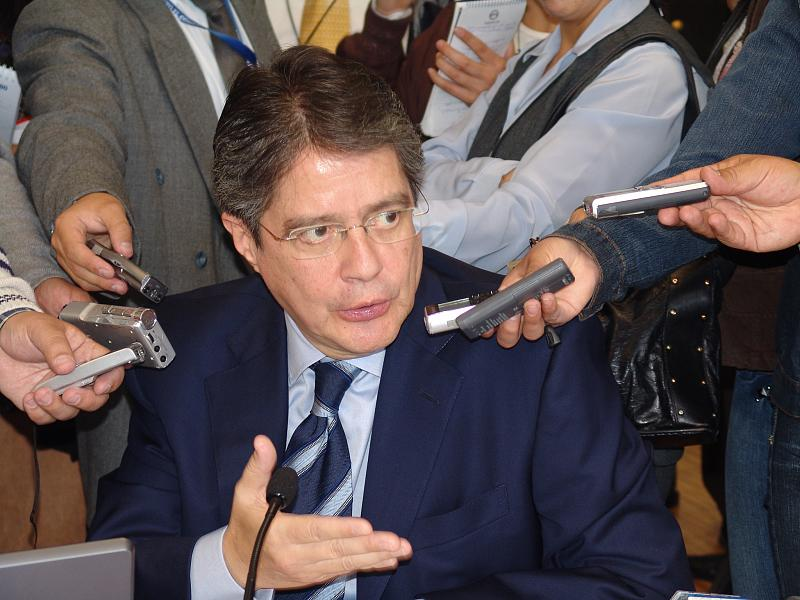
Lasso in November 2008

During the 1990s, Lasso was named the head of operations in Ecuador for Coca-Cola, following the local bankruptcy of the company in that region. In this role, Lasso was tasked with restructuring the company and bringing it back to financial health. He has since sat on the boards of directors for both Coca-Cola and Mavesa, and also was chairman of the board of directors of the Guayas Transit Commission as well as being a member of the Board of Directors of CAF – Development Bank of Latin America and the Caribbean.

In 1994 Lasso became the CEO of Banco Guayaquil. His brother-in-law Danilo Carrera Drouet previously was CEO of Banco Guayaquil from 1983 to 1984. As a part of his tenure, he founded the Bancos del Barrio program, a community banking initiative that brought in local shopkeepers as economic partners with the bank in planning and strategy. The program was cited by the Inter-American Development Bank as an advancement in grassroots banking penetration strategy. He resigned from his post as Executive President in 2012. Lasso is, through a trust named with his initials, GLM, the largest shareholder in Banco de Guayaquil, where he was executive president for more than 20 years. He is also the founder of the Fundación del Barrio.

In March 2020, Lasso created the humanitarian initiative Saving Lives which was an initiative against the COVID-19 pandemic and raised US$8 million to help purchase medical supplies and equipment for the Ecuadorian Health System.

== Political career ==
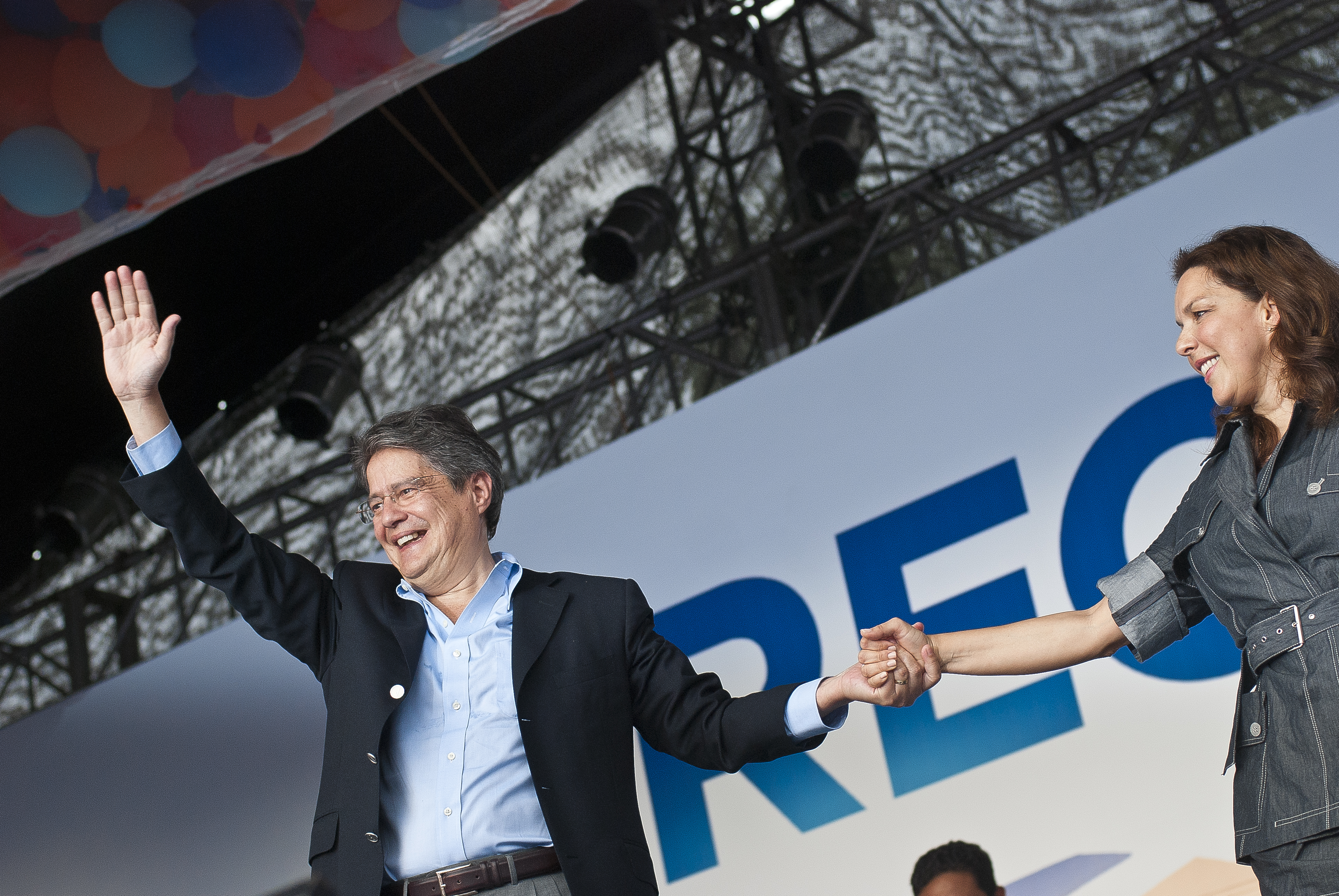
Lasso during the 2013 election

In 1998, Lasso was appointed as the Governor of Guayas, during which the national government underwent mass privatization of public companies and industries.

Ecuador went through an economic collapse in 1999, following which Lasso was temporarily appointed to the newly created position of Superminister of the Economy, replacing the resigning Ana Lucía Armijos. As finance minister, he served under President Jamil Mahuad and took over negotiations with the International Monetary Fund for economic support. He was also tasked with coordinating government policy in response to the country's economic crisis.

In January 2003, President Lucio Gutiérrez named Lasso as the Ecuadorian Itinerant Ambassador, a position recently established. He would serve in this position until it was disestablished a few months later in April of that year. In anticipation of his first presidential campaign, Lasso founded the center-right party Creating Opportunities which outlined many policies against the Rafael Correa administration.

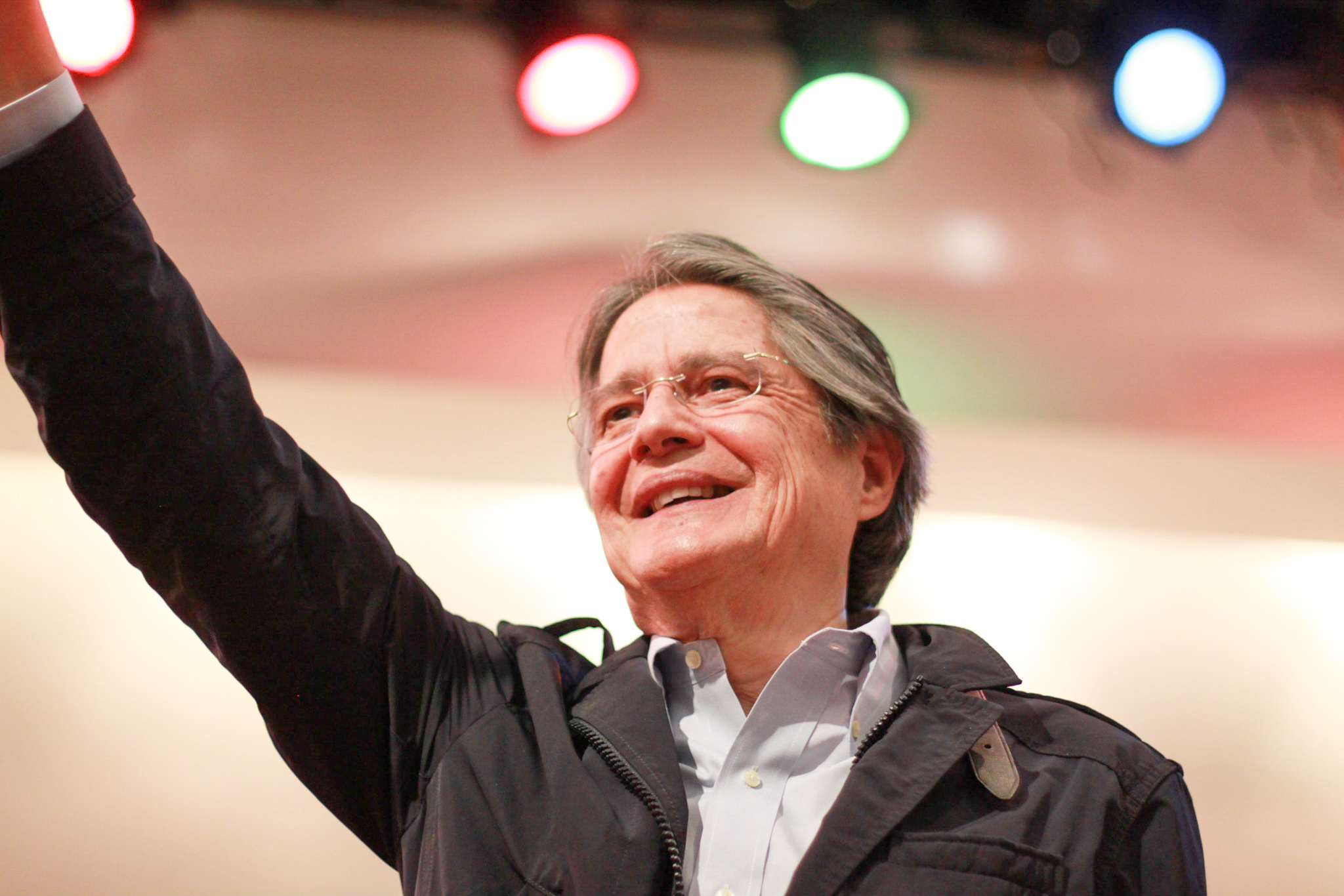
Lasso at a campaign event during the 2017 election

=== Early presidential campaigns ===
In the 2013 general election, he was the presidential candidate for the party Creating Opportunities. He landed in second place with 22.68% of valid votes, losing to incumbent President Rafael Correa who received more than double that amount (57.17%).

In early 2017, Lasso launched his second presidential campaign to succeed incumbent President Correa for the conservative Creating Opportunities party in the 2017 presidential elections. His campaign's theme was one of "change" and he pledged to create one million jobs in Ecuador. Lasso received 48.84% and lost to Lenín Moreno. Following the result, Lasso accused his opponents of electoral fraud and called the incoming administration "illegitimate".

In February 2017, Lasso told The Guardian that should he win the presidential election he would "cordially ask" Julian Assange, the WikiLeaks founder, to leave the Ecuadorian Embassy in London within 30 days.

== 2021 general election ==
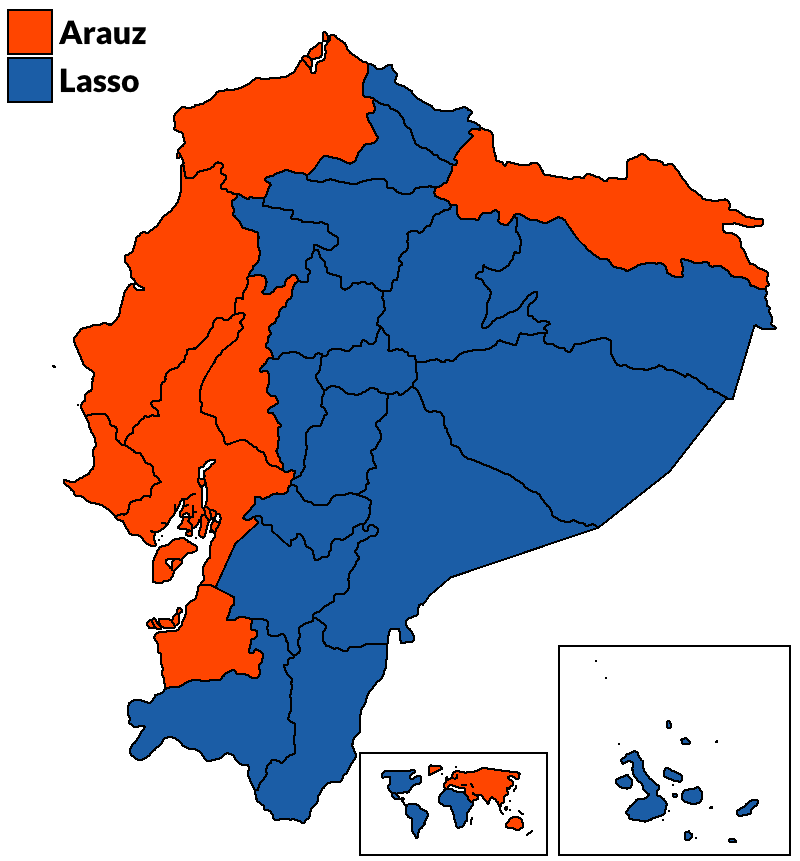
Results from the 2021 run-off election in April

Lasso ran as a candidate again in the 2021 general election. He named neurosurgeon Alfredo Borrero as his running-mate in October 2020. In the first round, Lasso was slightly behind indigenous rights activist Yaku Pérez Guartambel but eventually garnered enough votes to secure a narrow second-place finish.

Following his first-round second-place finish, Lasso faced socialist and Rafael Correa ally Andrés Arauz. Arauz was considered to be the front-runner for the presidency and the "handpicked candidate" of former president Correa. In polling before the run-off, Arauz was leading Lasso with one indicating an 82% certainty of Arauz defeating Lasso. Lasso defeated Arauz on 11 April in the run-off election, with many news outlets noting the conservative shift among the Ecuadorian electorate. Lasso won 52.4% of the vote, while Arauz won 47.6%. His victory was also seen as a win for free-market advocates in the country. Some news outlets described Lasso's win as an upset victory.

After his victory, President of Uruguay Luis Lacalle Pou became the first national leader to congratulate Lasso and wished that both Uruguay and Ecuador will "work together" upon his inauguration. President Sebastián Piñera, President Iván Duque Márquez and President Mario Abdo Benítez also congratulated Lasso. Former presidents Mauricio Macri and Felipe Calderón believed Lasso's victory would be beneficial to Ecuador and Latin America. In a statement released by the White House, President Joe Biden congratulated Lasso and Ecuadorian voters for "demonstrating the power of peaceful and inclusive political participation and upholding the ideals of democracy".

== Presidency (2021–2023) ==
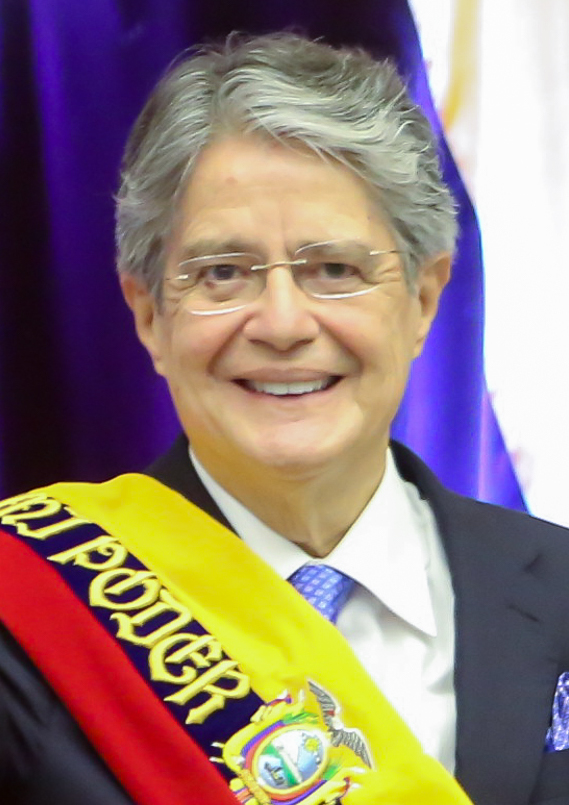
- Guillermo Lasso; 24 May 2021 – 23 November 2023
- Vice President: Alfredo Borrero (2021–2023)
- Election: 2021
- Seat: Carondelet Palace

=== Transition ===
After his election victory, bonds for Ecuador soared with many believing that under the Lasso administration, the country will uphold the International Monetary Fund (IMF). Lasso vowed to uphold a $6.5 billion financing agreement with the IMF and to keep payments on Ecuador's overseas bonds. Lasso also noted that his administration would focus on working with the United States, Chile, Brazil and Colombia while distancing from Cuba and Venezuela.

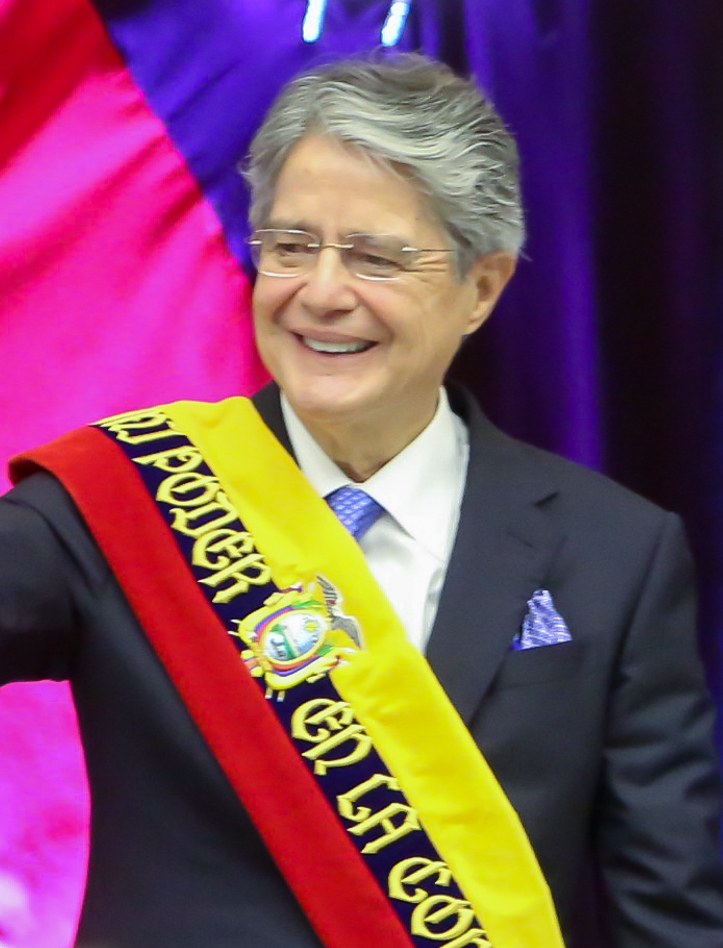
Lasso shortly after being inaugurated as president, May 2021

Addressing the Venezuelan presidential crisis, Lasso invited disputed President Juan Guaidó to his inauguration instead of President Nicolás Maduro. Lasso also announced that he will seek to regularize the situation of over 400,000 Venezuelan migrants living in Ecuador. While discussing the migration issue with Colombian President Iván Duque Marquez, Lasso said a possible option would be to grant Venezuelan migrants temporary protected status.

On 15 April, Lasso announced that on his first day in office, he will send a tax cut proposal to the National Assembly in which he will eliminate the 2% sales tax on micro-enterprises and the tax on foreign currency outflows. Lasso will try to lower the value-added tax within the economic incentive plan.

On 20 April, Lasso met with President Lenín Moreno to begin the transitional activities from the previous administration at the Carondelet Palace in Quito. Moreno vowed a transition of a "timely, transparent, truthful and technical manner". Lasso issued that his main priorities after being inaugurated would be to increase the COVID-19 vaccination rates in the country, vowing to vaccinate 9 million people within his first 100 days in office. He had talked to Chilean President Sebastián Piñera about obtaining loans to purchase vaccines with the support of the Inter-American Development Bank. Lassos said he aim for bilateral talks with Russia, China, the United States, the European Union and Chile to try to acquire vaccines.

On 27 April, Lasso named the first members of his cabinet, with women public servants dominating several political positions. He vowed that he would nominate as many women in his cabinet as "women must be in decision-making positions".

On 14 May, the Social Christian Party (PSC) announced that they would no longer support Lasso or his government for not "respecting" a legislative agreement with the Union for Hope Party (UNES) in the National Assembly. The PSC said that they felt that Lasso's government would "[leave out] the 47.5% of the Ecuadorians who voted for UNES or its 49 legislators". The Union for Hope Party is the opposition party during Lasso's administration. Five days later, he received credentials as Constitutional President of Ecuador in anticipation to his inauguration.

=== Tenure ===
==== 2021 ====
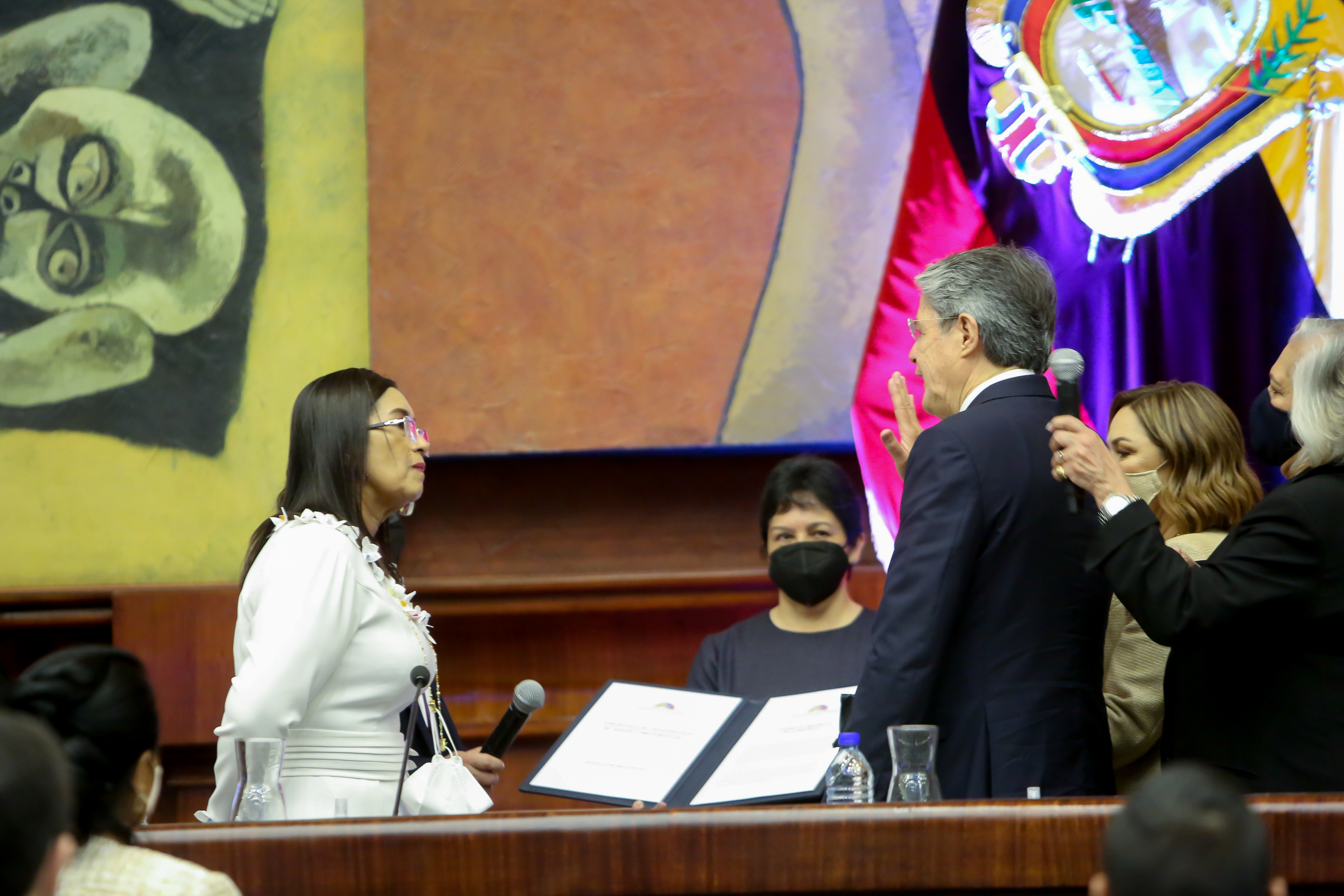
Lasso taking the oath of office, May 2021

Lasso was inaugurated as the 47th president of Ecuador on 24 May 2021 at Carondelet Palace in Quito. Attendees of his inauguration include: Dominican President Luis Abinader, Brazilian President Jair Bolsonaro, U.S. Ambassador Michael J. Fitzpatrick, King Felipe VI of Spain, Haitian President Jovenel Moïse, Paraguayan Vice President Hugo Velázquez Moreno, Uruguayan Foreign Minister Francisco Bustillo, Spanish Opposition Leader, former Spanish Prime Minister José María Aznar, and former Colombian President Andrés Pastrana Arango. Lasso became the country's first center-right president since Gustavo Noboa, who served from 2000 to 2003.

Lasso vowed that in his first days in office, he would increase COVID vaccination numbers and promote oil production, mining and privatizations in the country. One of his first actions in office included expanding the Ministry of Sports and eliminating the debts of citizens who owed $1,000. He also named Vice President Alfredo Borrero as in charge of overhauling the country's healthcare system and COVID response.

He announced the privatization of three refineries, highways, the public telecommunications company and the Banco del Pacífico, as well as tax exemption for investments in the tourism sector for 30 years.

In June 2021, Lasso announced that Ecuador would launch a 100-day vaccine plan where he aimed to vaccinate 9 million people and to revive the economy. He announced that he would hold talks with Russia to purchase 18 million doses of the Sputnik V COVID-19 vaccine. He also said that the country had acquired over a million doses of the Pfizer–BioNTech and Oxford–AstraZeneca COVID-19 vaccine. Lasso urged the United Nations to ramp up vaccine rollouts in the country through their COVAX programme. In August 2021, while announcing the approval of a third shot for people with weakened immune systems, the Lasso administration announced that 4.8 million people received two doses of the vaccine with almost 10 million receiving one dose.

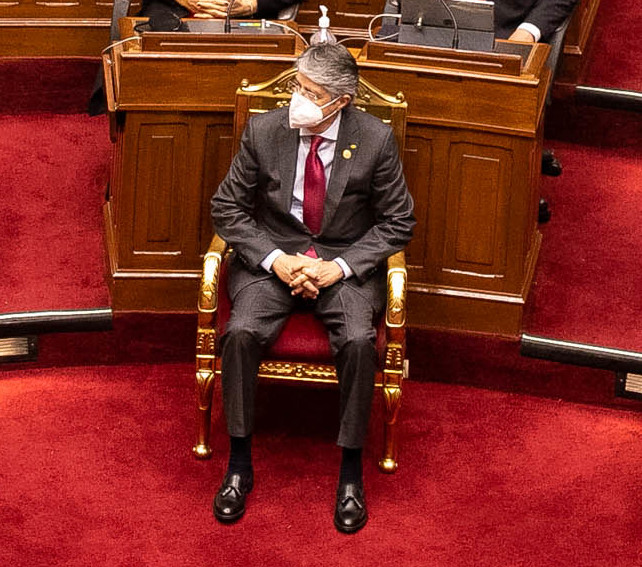
Lasso attending Pedro Castillo's inauguration as President of Peru in July 2021

His administration is seen as a stark contrast towards other right-leaning governments in other South American countries. Despite his high approval rating, his political party has little to no impact on the National Assembly. His proposals to privatize state resources in the oil sector, expand mining and labor reform have received negative approval from the assembly. In August 2021, Lasso visited Mexican President Andrés Manuel López Obrador to discuss trade deals and for Ecuador to be admitted into the Pacific Alliance. That same month, he helped finalize an agreement that allows citizens of Ecuador, Colombia, Bolivia, and Peru to seek employment and live in any of the four countries without needing a special sponsorship.

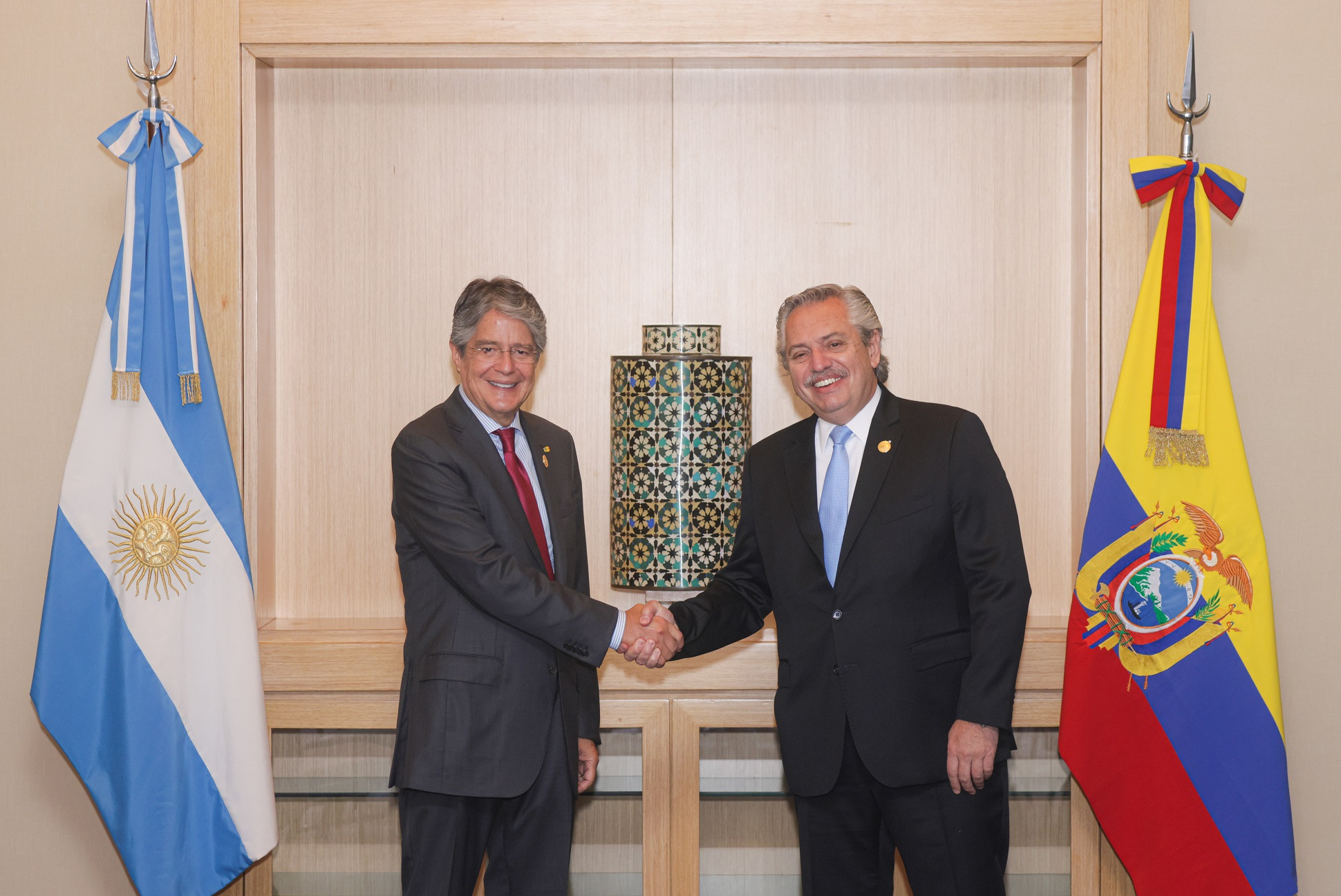
Lasso with Argentine President Alberto Fernández in July 2021

In September 2021, Lasso announced an economic package where he proposed a tax increase for the country's wealthiest citizens. His plan would tax individuals who make more than $25,000 a year or about 3.5% of the country's working population. While addressing the United Nations General Assembly that same month, he announced that he was in talks with Russia about establishing a Sputnik V vaccine lab in Ecuador. He had also reached a $1.5 billion deal with the International Monetary Fund.

In September 2021, he announced the launch of the Creation of Opportunities Act (CREO), named after his political party, which includes tax reform and the easing of the labour code. The law calls for lowering VAT on several products, eliminating the inheritance tax for children and spouses, eliminating the tax on small businesses, making hiring and working hours more flexible for new jobs, and creating free trade zones with tax incentives to attract foreign investment.

In September 2021, a massive protest was held in Quito against the Lasso administration with over 3,000 people in attendance. When a prison riot killed over 118 inmates at a prison in Guayaquil on 28 September, Lasso declared a state of emergency.

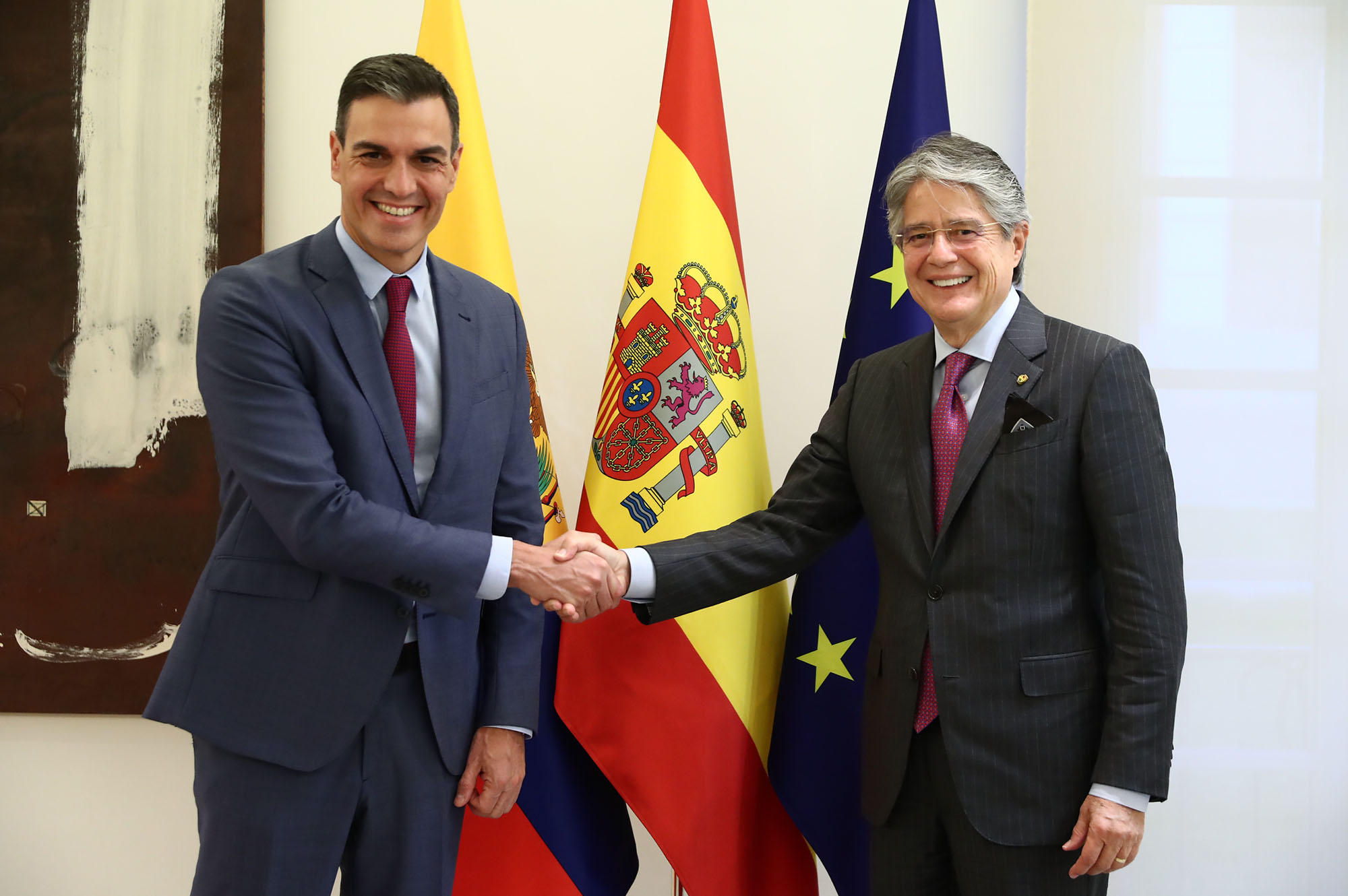
Lasso with Prime Minister of Spain Pedro Sánchez in November 2021

In October 2021, Lasso was named in the Pandora Papers leak where the International Consortium of Investigative Journalists (ICIJ) found that Lasso created an "offshore" framework to hide his actual net worth. In response to the leak, Lasso vowed to cooperate with the ICIJ and said that he had legally dissolved any assets or offshore accounts prior to the leak and that he has no association with any possible active accounts. Following the leak, an investigation by the country's Attorney General was launched against Lasso over potential tax fraud.

In October 2021, communities from Ecuador's Amazon region sued over plans by President Guillermo Lasso to expand fossil fuel extraction and mining that they claimed threatens millions of acres of pristine rainforest and the survival of native peoples. The proposed expansion of extraction activities targets remote areas of the rainforest, habitat for what are claimed to be some of the highest levels of biodiversity on the planet.

On 19 October 2021, Lasso ordered a state of national emergency in Ecuador over the rise in drug-related violence in the country. This was also caused by the deadly Guayaquil prison riot that occurred weeks earlier. While ordering the mobilization of police forces, Lasso said that "armed forces and police will be felt with force in the streets because we are decreeing a state of emergency throughout the national territory". The 60-day state of emergency order would focus on cracking down of corrupt officials and drug trafficking.

A November 2021 video of Lasso affirming his signing of the Madrid Charter and joining the alliance of right-wing and far-right individuals organized by the Spanish party Vox was shared, though the Lasso government would deny his participation.

In December 2021, a motion to impeach Lasso over what was revealed in the Pandora Papers was rejected by the National Assembly with 51 legislators in favor of the motion and 77 others against. A week later, Lasso announced the creation of a commission to investigate and end the rise in deadly prison riots and violence in the country.

==== 2022 ====
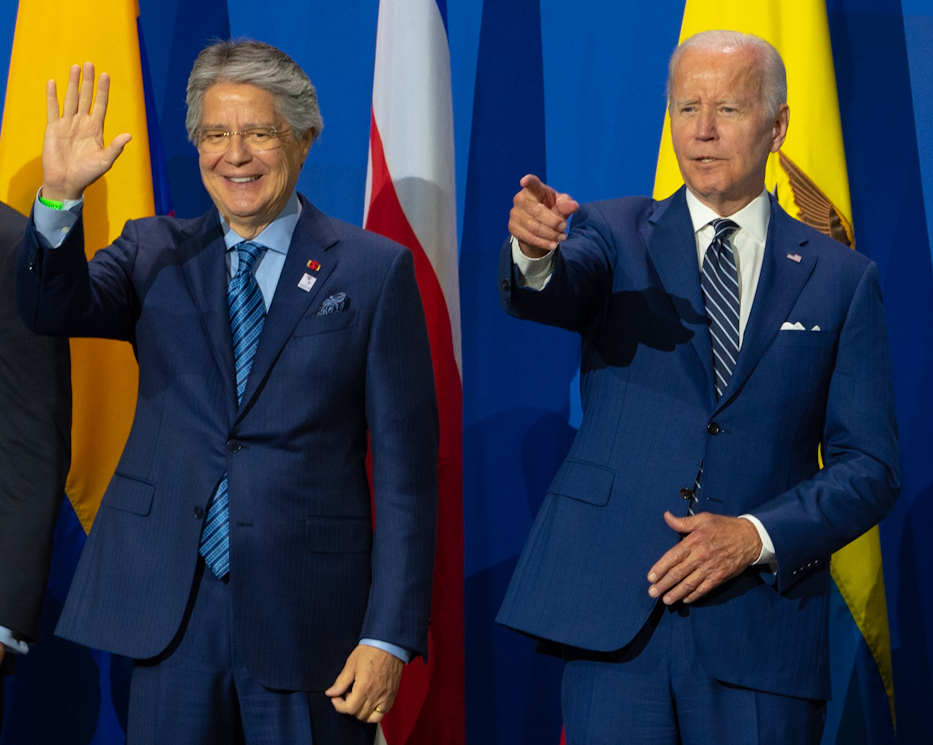
Lasso with U.S. President Joe Biden visiting the 9th Summit of the Americas in June 2022

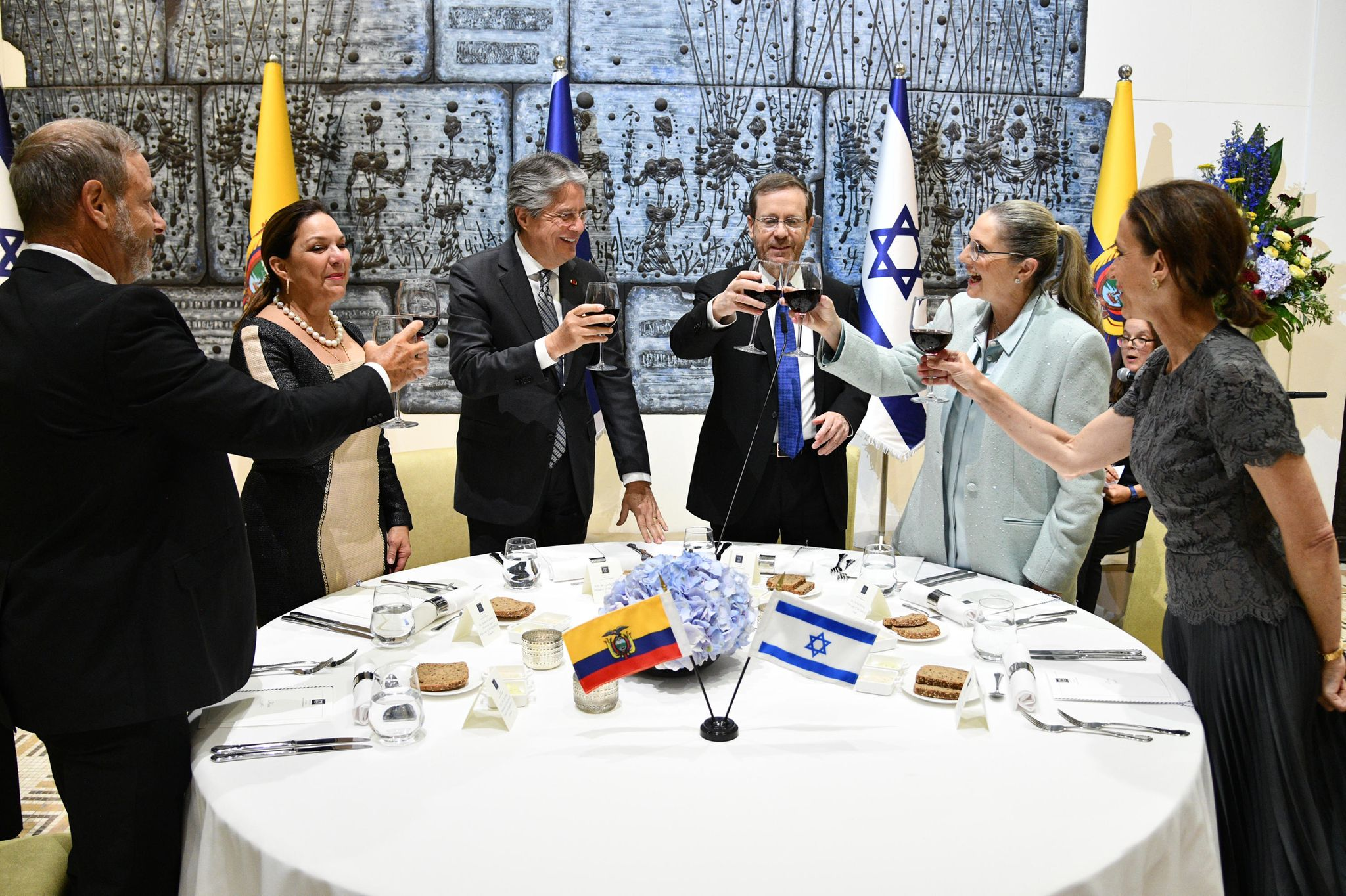
Lasso, Israeli President, Isaac Herzog and their wives in the Israeli President's residence. In the background is an Israeli volcanic ash artwork.

Following the Russian invasion of Ukraine in February 2022, Lasso said that Ecuador would support the position of the United Nations and the Organization of American States in condemning the invasion while labelling the invasion as "aggression", however, he said that Ecuador has no plans to suspend diplomatic relations with Russia. That same month, Lasso visited Beijing and met with President Xi Jinping where they discussed a trade deal set for the end of the year and renegotiated debt talks.

In March 2022, Lasso expressed interest in running for re-election in the 2025 election.

A series of protests against the economic policies of Lasso, triggered by increasing fuel and food prices, began on 13 June 2022. Lasso was met with controversy after he suspended social media communication over the protests and allowed police officials to use deadly force against protestors. As a response to this, several members of the National Assembly condemned Lasso and called for his impeachment, with this process eventually starting on 28 June 2022 and concluded without the necessary number of assembly votes to oust him. Lasso had refused to commence peace talks with Indigenous protest leaders to end the protests, which also led to condemnation from assembly members and protest leaders.

==== 2023 ====
A constitutional referendum was held on 5 February 2023, alongside the 2023 Ecuadorian local elections. Voters were asked to approve or reject a total of eight questions surrounding changes to the 2008 Constitution. Soon after the referendum, Reuters, Al Jazeera, CNN en Español and the Financial Times projected the failure of all eight of its proposals, with Lasso eventually conceding defeat.

In March 2023, Guillermo Lasso pointed out that the "fight against corruption in hospitals generates violence." corruption claimed the lives of hospital directors in Ecuador, organized crime controlled the administrative operations of hospitals, which ended the lives of Rubén Hernández, manager of the Delfina Torres de Esmeraldas hospital, and Nathaly López, administrative director of the IESS hospital Teodoro Maldonado Carbo, in Guayaquil, which led to the resignation of several managers, due to the lack of guarantees in terms of security.

In April 2023, he authorized by decree the carrying of weapons by civilians in the streets and public places. The presidential decision, announced without parliamentary debate or consultation with representative bodies, was rejected by large sectors of society. The Confederation of Indigenous Nationalities of Ecuador (CONAIE), the country's main indigenous organization, considers it "irresponsible" and fears the emergence of right-wing paramilitary militias as in Colombia. The Pact for Children and Adolescents, which includes several associations, and the Observatory for the Monitoring of Human Rights Obligations, have asked the government to abandon the decree.

In August 2023, presidential candidate and former National Assembly member Fernando Villavicencio was assassinated in Quito. Lasso, who first confirmed the assassination, convened a Security Cabinet meeting at the Palacio de Carondelet that evening. The meeting was attended by attorney general Diana Salazar Méndez and the presidents of the National Electoral Council and National Court of Justice. In a televised address to the nation shortly after midnight, Lasso announced three days of national mourning and the imposition of a state of emergency across the country for the following 60 days, entailing the deployment of the military to support the work of the police and the suspension of a number of civil liberties, such as freedom of assembly and the inviolability of the home. He also confirmed that the election would take place as scheduled on 20 August.

=== Impeachment inquiry and government dissolution ===
In March 2023, impeachment hearings began against Lasso on charges of embezzlement, after Ecuador's constitutional court approved the request from opposition lawmakers. Parliament voted to open an investigation into the head of state after a website revealed the existence of a system of corruption set up in public companies by Danilo Carrera, a brother-in-law of Lasso. He is accused of having known of its existence without opposing it. Newspaper La Posta would release audios of Rubén Cherres, an associate of Carrera, with Cherres being heard on the audio stating that he provided $1.5 million during the 2021 Ecuadorian general election for Lasso's presidential campaign. Later investigations reported that Cherres provided a link between the Albanian mafia and Lasso, specifically drug trafficking activity. On 24 February, the attorney general announced a new investigation into Lasso's dismissal of a police investigation into Cherres' ties to a drug trafficking ring. The charges allege that Lasso pressured the state police commander and the drug chief to conceal the investigation report.

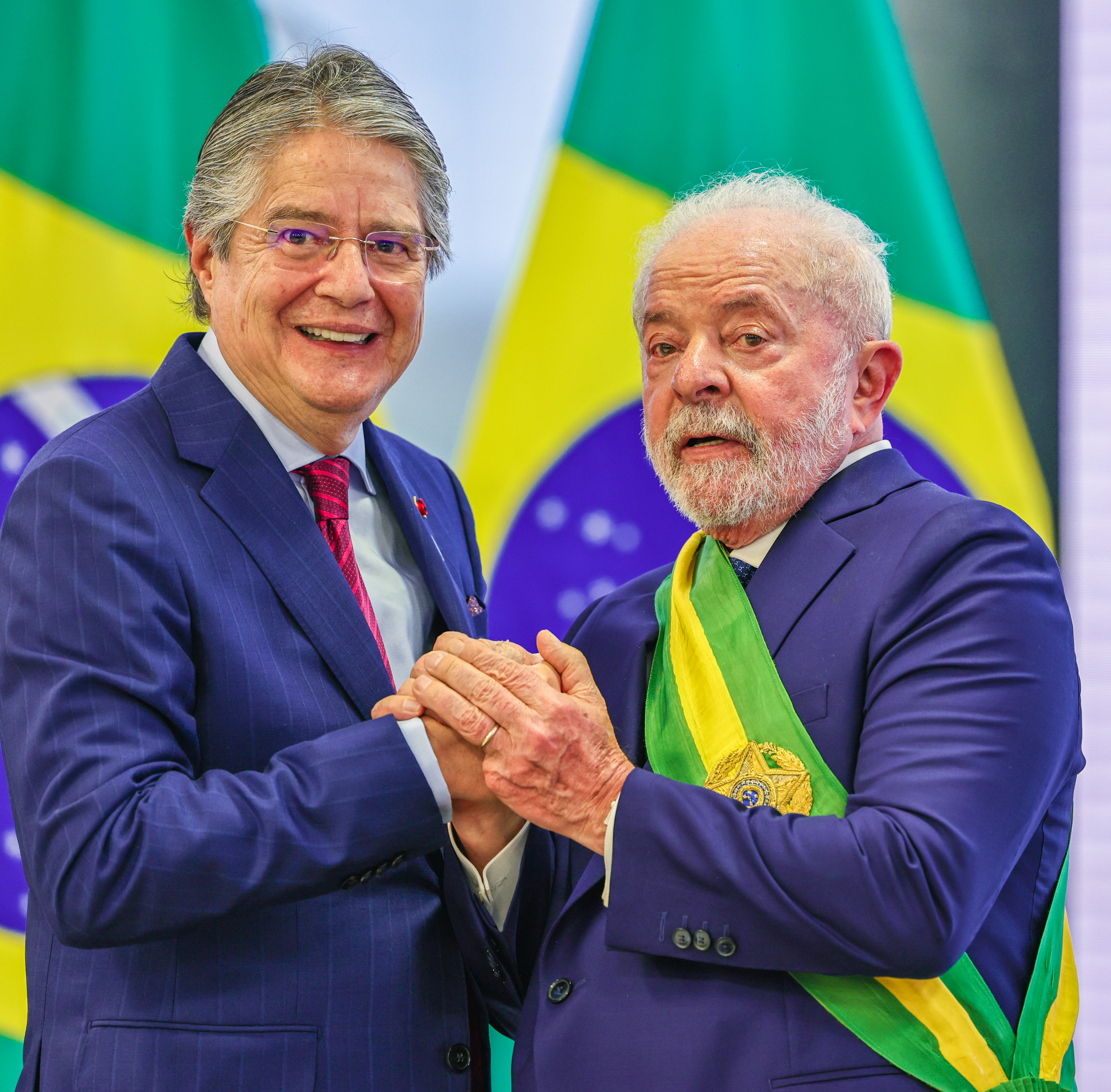
Lasso with President of Brazil Luiz Inácio Lula da Silva at his third inauguration in 2023

On 29 March, the Constitutional Court validated the parliament's request by six votes to three. Businessman Rubén Cherres, considered a key witness in the case, was murdered two days later on 31 March. Although he held no official position in the Lasso administration, several former officials claimed that Carrera played an important advisory role to the president and was a powerful figure in the presidential palace. In particular, he accompanied Lasso on his trip to Washington in December 2022.

The main argument for impeachment against Lasso is embezzlement and for ignoring irregularities in a contract between a state-run shipping company and an oil tanker company. The Constitutional Court approved the charge of embezzlement against Lasso, but declined the two charges of bribery in May 2023.

On 16 May 2023, the National Assembly officially began to impeachment proceedings against Lasso. During his testimony, Lasso called the impeachment proceedings politically motivated. However the following day, Lasso dissolved the National Assembly, invoking a constitutional measure known as muerte cruzada, bringing forward legislative and presidential elections. This was the first time in which an Ecuadorian president used this constitutional measure to avoid impeachment.

On 19 May, in an interview with The Washington Post, Lasso said he had no plans to run in the upcoming general election. In the October run-off, former National Assembly member and businessman Daniel Noboa was elected to replace Lasso.

=== Approval ratings ===
Lasso began his presidency with an approval rating of 71%, according to a CEDATOS survey in June 2021. In August 2021, a survey by Foreign Policy found his approval rating at a 73%. Foreign Policy noted his high approval rating was mainly due to his administration's response to the COVID-19 pandemic. The same poll found that 78% of Ecuadorians approved of his way of governing. In September 2021, Lasso was reported to have a 75% approval rating by Bloomberg News. Ratings have since dropped, as a May 2022 poll showed an approval of 38.5% and a 54.6% disapproval of Lasso. In June 2022, his approval rate was 17%.

In 2023 amid calls for his impeachment, Lasso's administration had an approval rating of 13.93% and had a disapproval rating of 51.89%.

== Post-presidency ==
Shortly before leaving office, Lasso had written a memoir about his 900 days as president titled "900 Days". Shortly after leaving office, he was invited to attend and represent Ecuador in the inauguration of President-elect of Argentina Javier Milei in December 2023. He attended the state funeral of former president of Chile Sebastián Piñera in February 2024.

In April 2024, Lasso ruled out the possibility of running for president again in 2025, while endorsing the idea that CREO should run a presidential candidate in 2025.

In April 2025 he launched a program of scholarships for Ecuadorians that would like to study Master's Degree in Social Sciences at one of the 50 universities in the Times Higher Education social sciences ranking.

== Political positions ==
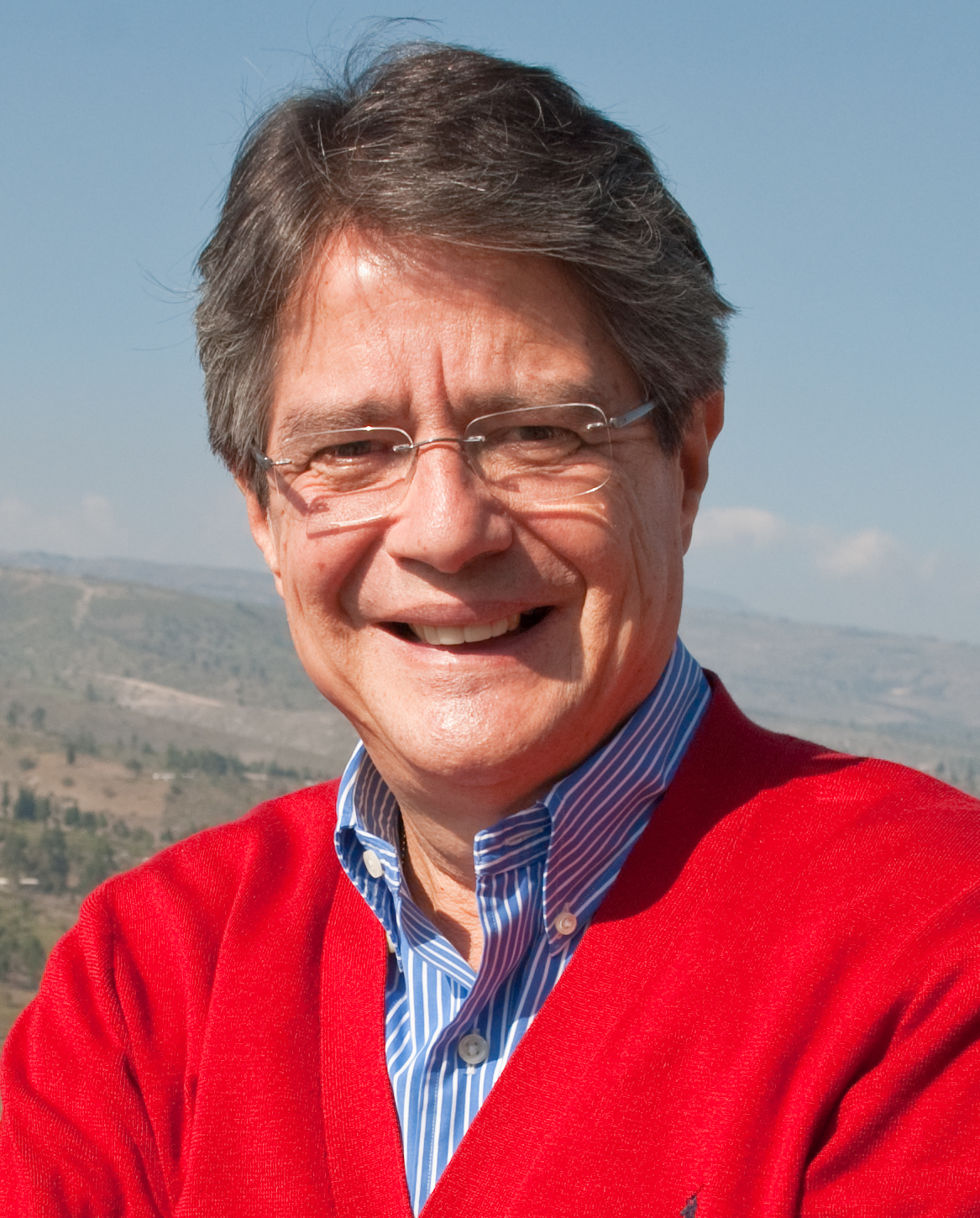
Lasso in 2013

Lasso said that "life has made [him] liberal". However, when asked if he identified with that term, he replied that he does not place himself on any ideological ground, but believes in "good ideas". He responded in the same way when asked if he was from the right or the left. His public agenda includes classic liberal points such as the defense of the division of powers to limit government and of fundamental rights such as freedom of the press. His Think tank Fundación Ecuador Libre has links with Libertarianism and shared common spaces and agendas at the regional level with other organizations which are part of the Atlas Network.

He has also expressed himself in favour of reducing taxes, state debt, and increasing the minimum wage with the announced aim of increasing productivity and employment in the private sector. On the tax on capital outflows, he thinks that it is a tax on capital income, and he has committed himself to eliminating at least nine taxes if he is elected president. Lasso also was accused of supporting reducing the minimum wage from $400 per month in 2020 to $120 per month; however, that was a statement taken out of context from an interview he gave in March 2020 in the middle of the pandemic, while suggesting letting businesses recruit unemployed poor single mothers so they could at least get some income.

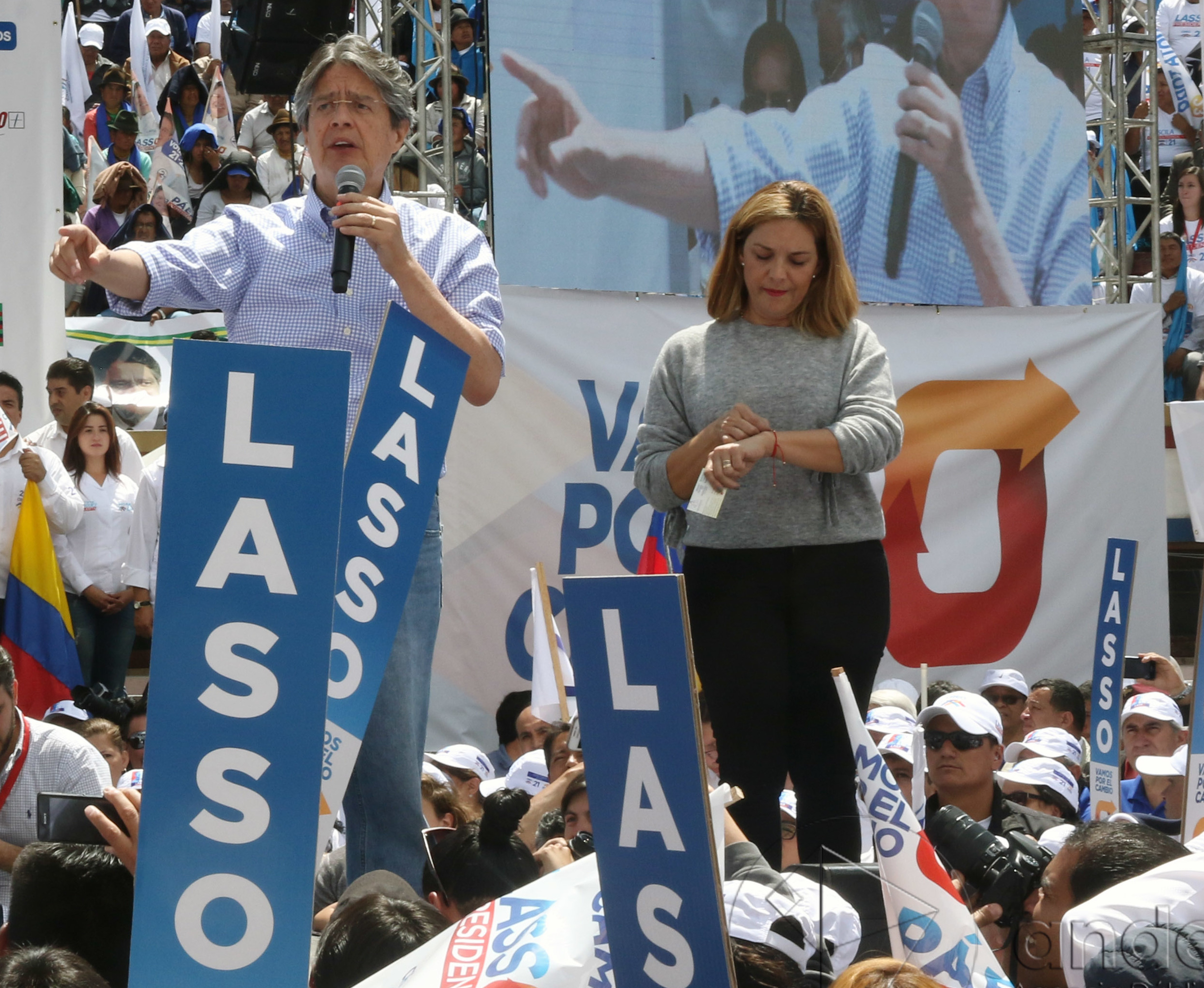
Lasso holding a 2017 campaign event

Lasso has declared himself an admirer of José María Aznar's Silent Revolution, a series of reforms implemented by the former Prime Minister of Spain. On foreign trade, he has said that he favours a greater opening of trade with Ecuador's major partners, the United States and the European Union so that national producers have greater export opportunities.

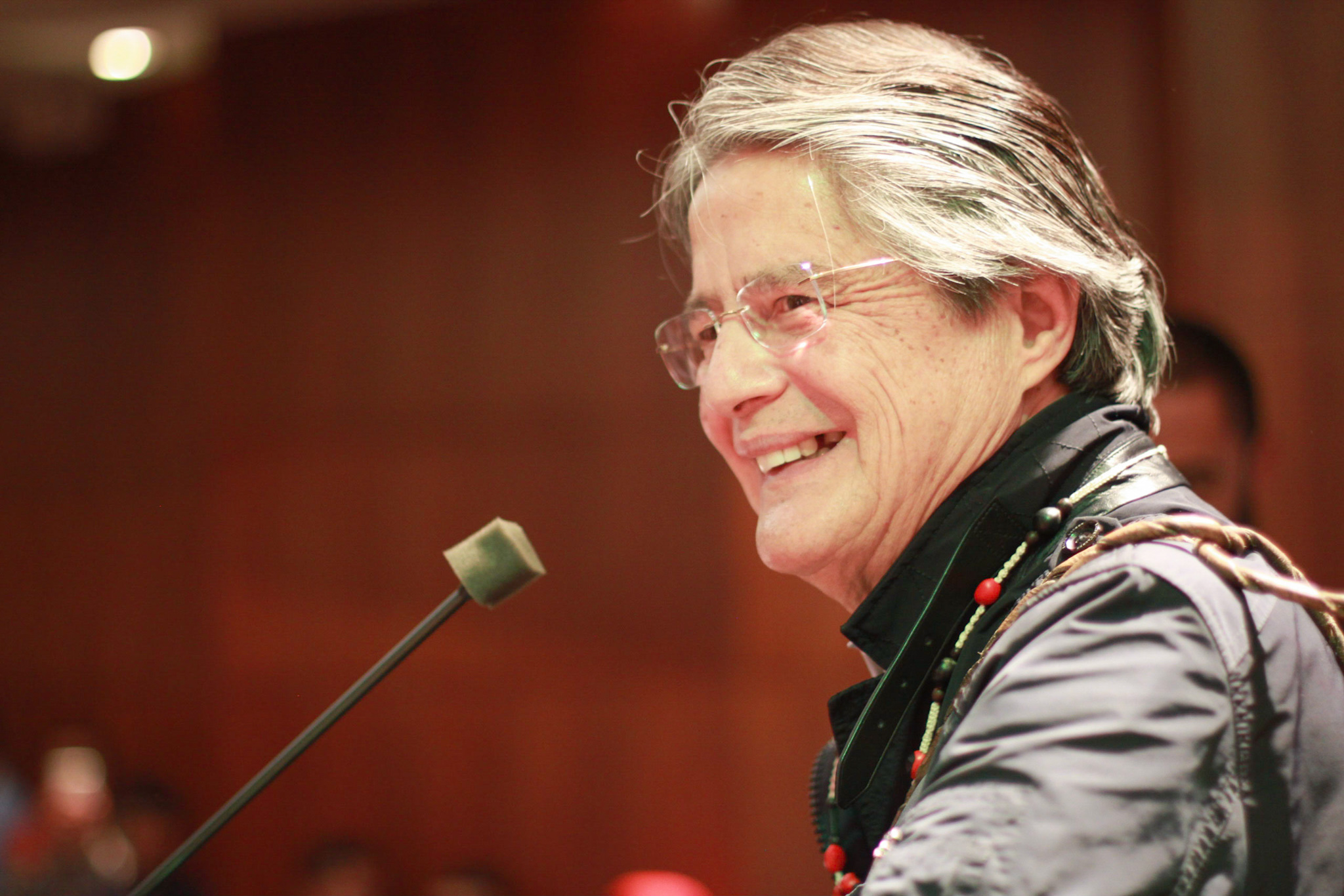
Lasso at an election event before the first round of the 2017 election

Lasso was a supernumerary of Opus Dei. On abortion, he has said in general terms that he "believes in life from conception and that is a principle I will not change". In April 2021, when the Supreme Court ruled in favor of abortions in rape cases, Lasso said that he had "full respect" of the ruling and vowed to respect the separate political branches.

On other issues such as marriage between people of the same sex, he has said that he is in favour of allowing civil union but differentiating it from conventional marriage. On immigration, he has proposed controls for those with criminal records, but to facilitate the entry of foreigners for tourism, investment, or humanitarian reasons. On the decriminalisation of drugs, he maintains that a national debate is necessary to propose alternatives in the face of the failure of the war on drugs; on issues of environmental conservation, he states that he will keep the Yasuní Amazon reserve free of oil exploitation.

He also declares himself an enemy of the 21st-century socialism promoted from Venezuela and Cuba, whose Ecuadorian chapter identifies with the Citizens' Revolution led by Rafael Correa. Lasso has called ALBA a "third world empire". In response to his criticism of the Ecuadorian government's anti-capitalist discourse and measures, President Correa and other officials and members of Alianza PAIS have questioned Lasso by portraying him as a representative of the political forces that governed Ecuador before his party came to power in 2007, and pointing out that Lasso's tax proposals are irresponsible with the state budget. Also, President Rafael Correa claims Lasso had a hand in Ecuador's financial crisis of 1999.

In April 2022, during an official visit to Argentina, Lasso expressed his position in regards of the Falkland Islands sovereignty dispute, expressing support for Argentina's position, stating that "Ecuador supports Argentina's thesis regarding the Malvinas Islands" and that Ecuador will "always support Argentina in its claim".

== Health ==
In 2018, Lasso underwent a surgical procedure on his spinal cord at the Cleveland Clinic in the United States following a back injury from a fall at a pilgrimage in Spain in 2013. The operation required him to use a forearm crutch since the operation. In June 2021, Lasso had a second spinal cord surgery in Miami, Florida, in the United States to "regain regular leg mobility".

In June 2022, Lasso was diagnosed with COVID-19. In August 2022, Lasso announced that he was going to receive treatment for melanoma near his eye in the United States. He underwent surgery, which was successful, and returned to Quito to undergo further treatment.

In February 2023, Lasso fractured his leg following a fall and underwent surgery. As a result, he required the use of a wheelchair and walker.

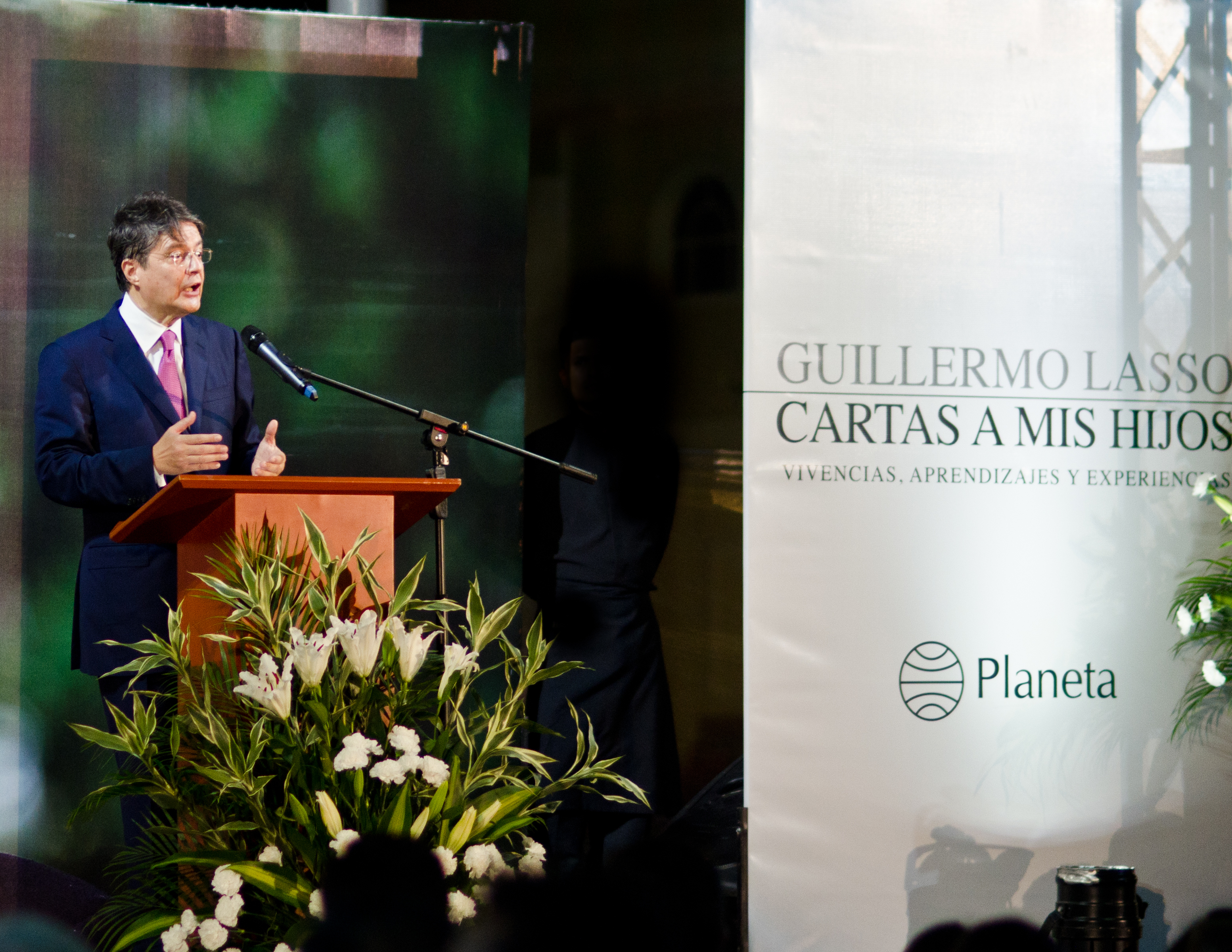
Lasso at a 2011 event for Letters to my Children

== Writing ==
In 2011, Lasso published the book Cartas a Mis Hijos, which translates to Letters to my Children, which contains lessons he developed from his time working in business and highlights recommendations for the economic development of Ecuador. Among his ideas, Lasso discusses the need for greater sovereignty over parts of the national economy. The book advocates for the Ecuadorian government to develop policies that create more economic opportunities for its citizens.

Soon after the release of Cartas a Mis Hijos, former Prime Minister of Spain José María Aznar stated the book held key insights into what is needed for development. During the book launch event, former Ecuadorian president Gustavo Noboa was present to show support for the project, along with other national politicians. Following its publications, Lasso performed policy speeches and used the plans in the book as a basis for a presidential political campaign.

In 2012, he published the book Otro Ecuador Es Posible.

Political offices
Preceded by Guido Chiriboga Parra	Governor of Guayas; 1998–1999	Succeeded by Benjamín Rosales Valenzuela
New office	Super Minister of the Economy; 1999	Office abolished
Preceded by Lenín Moreno	President of Ecuador; 2021–2023	Succeeded by Daniel Noboa
Party political offices
New political party	Creating Opportunities nominee for President of Ecuador; 2013, 2017, 2021	Most recent
