= Ana Lucía Armijos =

Ecuadorian politician and economist

Ecuadorian Ambassador to Spain
- In office 1999–2000

Minister of Economy and Finance
- In office February 15, 1999 – 1999; Served with Guillermo Lasso (as Superminister)
- Preceded by: Fidel Jaramillo
- Succeeded by: Alfredo Arízaga

Ecuadorian Ministry of the Interior
- In office August 1998 – February 15, 1999
- President: Jamil Mahuad
- Preceded by: Edgar Rivadeneyra Orcés
- Succeeded by: Vladimiro Álvarez

President of the Monetary Junta of Ecuador
- In office July 15, 1993 – 1996

President of the Central Bank of Ecuador
- In office August 25, 1992 – July 15, 1993

Personal details
- Born: October 13, 1947 (age 78) Quito
- Education: Catholic University of Ecuador
- Occupation: Economist

Ana Lucía Armijos Hidalgo (born October 13, 1947) is an Ecuadorian politician and economist. She was the first female Ecuadorian Minister of the Interior.

== Education and career ==
Ana Lucía Armijos was born on October 13, 1947, to former Colonel and conservative politician Rafael Armijos in Quito. She completed her high school studies at Spellman High School, where she achieved one of the best academic careers in that school's history. She graduated from the Catholic University of Ecuador as an economist and completed a Master's degree in economics at the University of Illinois at Urbana–Champaign and then her graduate studies in economic theory and development at the University of Mississippi. Armijos worked for some years as a professor at the Catholic University of Ecuador and held positions in the Central Bank of Ecuador such as analyst and numerous directorial and managerial positions. She was also a macroeconomist for the operational division of the World Bank's West African department.

=== Presidency of Sixto Durán Ballén ===
On August 25, 1992, she was inaugurated President of the Central Bank of Ecuador by Sixto Durán Ballén. However, she began to experience difficulties with the president of the Ecuadorian Monetary Board, Roberto Baquerizo, which made the future of either organization uncertain until the departure of Baquerizo and appointment of Armijos to his post on July 15, 1993.

During the impeachment of Alberto Dahik over trials of embezzlement, Armijos became a vocal defender of Dahik and caused some controversy when she said "a loss for the country, where there are not many smart men" after his flight from Ecuador to Costa Rica. Later, it would be indicated that she was one of many possible aspirants to the office of Vice President.

On May 30, 1997, Carlos Solórzano, Chief Justice of the Supreme Court of Justice of Ecuador, issued an arrest warrant for Armijos in the case of Banco Continental on accusations that she as president of the Monetary Board approved a 200 million dollar bailout of Continental. Armijos went into hiding for exactly a year, as the new Chief Justice, Héctor Romero Parducci, declared her innocent of the charges leveled against her in May 1998.

=== Presidency of Jamil Mahuad ===
In August 1998, Jamil Mahuad appointed Armijos Minister of the Interior, making her the first woman to hold this position. During her term, she proposed the creation of a national council of governors.

On February 15, 1999, Armijos was appointed Minister of Economy and Finance to replace Fidel Jaramillo, who had resigned in protest to the Capital Movement Tax, also known as the "1% Tax." On March 11, Armijos and President Mahuad made the decision to declare a bank holiday that would freeze the deposits of everyone in Ecuador in response to the financial crisis then facing the country. This provoked the incineration of the alliance between the Social Christian Party and the ruling Democracia Popular party and calls were made to impeach Armijos, with Víctor Hugo Sicouret raising a lawsuit over the holiday and Jaime Nebot requesting the Constitutional Congress place sanctions on Armijos. By the end of August, she resigned after securing the support of the International Monetary Fund for Ecuador's foreign debts. She was soon sent out of the country, being appointed the Ecuadorian Ambassador to Spain, and her former position passed to Alfredo Arízaga.

== Later life and persecution ==
In July 2000, she and former president Jamil Mahuad were accused by Víctor Granda and Napoleón Gómez Real of violating the constitution and, days later, had arrest warrants issued on them by the Supreme Court of Justice of Ecuador. Armijos fled to the United States and was granted political asylum there.

In June 2006, Armijos and Mahuad had their charges lifted by the second chamber of the Supreme Court of Justice, who asserted that they did not have enough evidence to actually arrest them, but they would disregard this decision and reopen the case in December 2012.

== Bibliography ==
- César Raúl Robalino Gonzaga; Ana Lucía Armijos; Augusto de la Torre (1994). The Ecuador Brady Deal. Translation and Interpretation Services, Division of the World Bank.
