= Manuel Belisario Moreno =

Ecuadorian writer and priest

Manuel Belisario Moreno Coronel (died 1917) was an Ecuadorian writer and priest.

Moreno is best known as the author of the novel Naya o La Chapetona (1900).

He was the father of the sculptor Alfredo Palacio Moreno (1912-1998), and the grandfather of the 44th President of Ecuador, Alfredo Palacio González (1939-2025).
