= María de Lourdes Alcívar =

First Lady of Ecuador

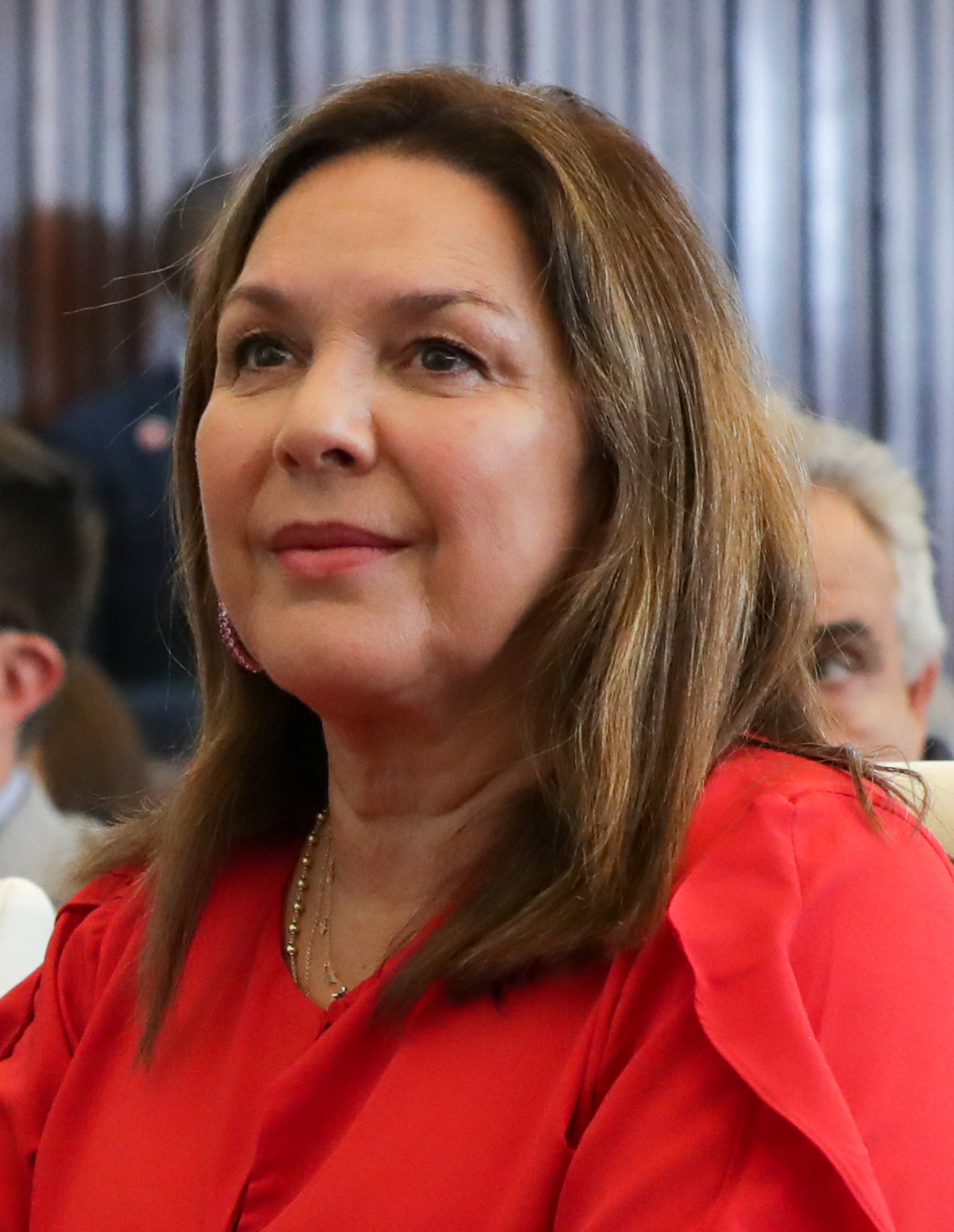
- Alcívar in May 2022

First Lady of Ecuador
- In role 24 May 2021 – 23 November 2023
- President: Guillermo Lasso
- Preceded by: Rocío González Navas
- Succeeded by: Lavinia Valbonesi

Personal details
- Born: María de Lourdes Alcívar Crespo; 15 November 1963 (age 62) Guayaquil, Ecuador
- Party: Creating Opportunities
- Spouse: Guillermo Lasso (m. 1980)
- Children: 5

Maria de Lourdes Alcívar Crespo (born 15 November 1963) is an Ecuadorian socialite, who was the First Lady of Ecuador from 24 May 2021 to 23 November 2023, as the wife of former President Guillermo Lasso. She was seen as a "key female figure" of the Creating Opportunities party.

== Early life ==
Alcívar was born in Guayaquil in 1963. However, she was raised in Samborondón, Ecuador.

In 1973, Alcívar met Guillermo Lasso, whom she would marry in 1980. They have five children: María de Lourdes, Juan, Guillermo Enrique, Santiago and María de las Mercedes.

== Political involvement ==
Alcívar was supportive of her husband and appeared in all of his campaign events in 2013, 2017 and 2021.

=== First Lady of Ecuador ===
Lasso announced his third presidential campaign for the 2017 election and narrowly advanced to the run-off in February 2021 facing Andrés Arauz. On 11 April, Lasso defeated Arauz in the run-off election making Alcívar the First Lady-designate. The following week, she accompanied her husband to meet President Lenin Moreno to discuss the transition period. There, Alcívar and First Lady Rocío González Navas talked about modernizing the role of First Lady.
