= Ximena Bohórquez =

Ecuadorian physician and politician (born 1956)

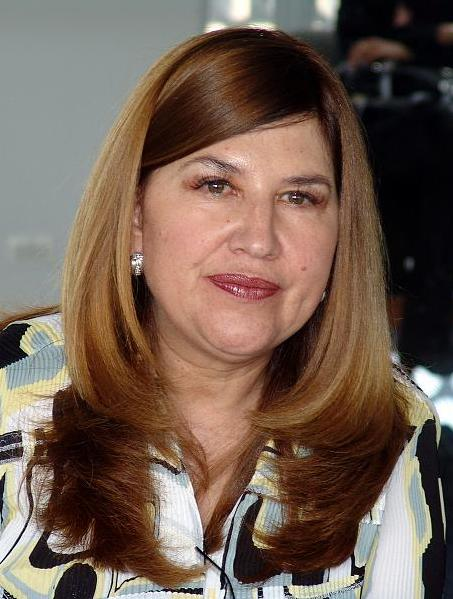
- Bohórquez in 2008

Member of the Ecuadorian Constituent Assembly
- In office November 30, 2007 – October 25, 2008

Member of the National Congress
- In office January 15, 2003 – January 2007
- Constituency: Pichincha Province

First Lady of Ecuador
- In role January 15, 2003 – April 20, 2005
- Preceded by: María Isabel Baquerizo
- Succeeded by: María Beatriz Paret

Personal details
- Born: Ximena Bohórquez Romero; November 12, 1956 (age 69) Quito, Ecuador
- Party: Patriotic Society
- Spouse: Lucio Gutiérrez (m. 1981)
- Children: 2
- Education: Central University of Ecuador
- Occupation: Physician, politician

Ximena Bohórquez Romero (born November 12, 1956) is an Ecuadorian physician and politician of the Patriotic Society Party. She served as the First Lady of Ecuador from January 15, 2003, to April 20, 2005, as the wife of President Lucio Gutiérrez. She was also a member of the National Congress and the Constituent Assembly of 2007.

== Biography ==
Ximena Bohórquez was born in Quito on November 12, 1956, the youngest of eight siblings. Her parents promoted the goal of higher education for all of their children, so Ximena decided to enter the Central University of Ecuador's Faculty of Medicine, from which she graduated in 1982. She married Lucio Gutiérrez on September 4, 1981, while she was in her last year of school, and they had two daughters together. She later specialized in public health and obtained a diploma in obesity.

She worked as a staff doctor at one of the health clinics of the Ecuadorian Institute of Social Security for eight years, in addition to four years as a volunteer for the organization Women in Self-Management and Development, giving talks on reproductive health in lower-income sectors of the capital.

In 2000, she requested the dissolution of her conjugal partnership with Gutiérrez on the grounds of mistrust, although they eventually reconciled. In 2009, her husband filed a new divorce claim due to "incompatibility of characters", but this was denied by the court.

== Political life ==
Bohórquez entered politics after the coup d'état of January 21, 2000, in which her husband was a key actor. After Gutiérrez was imprisoned, she became leader of the Popular Parliament of Quito, an unofficial entity that brought together some social groups in the capital city, and that finally won his release. During this time, she became a recurring figure in the media due to her fight for his amnesty.

=== First Lady and legislator ===
When Lucio Gutiérrez took over as head of state on January 15, 2003, Bohórquez became the First Lady, and thus president of the National Institute for Children and the Family (INNFA). In the same election, she also won a seat in the National Congress, representing Pichincha Province, which she held concurrently with her role as First Lady.

During her tenure at INNFA, she managed to allocate it a budget of more than $76 million. She signed an agreement with Bambino Gesù Hospital in Italy for the care of children with catastrophic illnesses. In addition, as a legislator, she promoted several laws in favor of women and children, the rights of adolescents, and against domestic violence. Among her most notable activities in the political sphere were promotion of the Free Maternity Law and negotiations during a tariff crisis.

In 2007, she won a seat in the Constituent Assembly called by President Rafael Correa to draft a new constitution. The same year, she disaffiliated from the Patriotic Society Party after being expelled from the National Congress for voting against her bloc, an event that led to problems her the marriage which were resolved in court in 2009. She subsequently returned to the party in a less public role. She was a candidate for National Assembly in the February 2021 general election, but failed to win a seat.
