= 2006 Ecuadorian referendum =

- 26 November 2006

Do you agree that the eight policies of the Ten-Year Education Plan (2006-2015), constant in this consultation, are considered priority State policies for public sector investment?
| For | 91.59% |
| Against | 8.41% |

Do you agree that, within a period of five months, the National Congress debates and approves laws aimed at: a) Allocating sufficient resources in favor of Ecuadorians to guarantee the prevention and medical care of pathologies, elevating Universal Health Insurance to the category of State policy? b) A 0.5% annual increase in health participation in relation to GDP until 2012, or until reaching at least 4% of GDP?
| For | 89.60% |
| Against | 10.40% |

Do you agree that the National Congress, within a period of five months, issues laws aimed at guaranteeing that unforeseen oil resources or those greater than what is budgeted in the general State budget, are allocated to the social investment and productive reactivation?
| For | 88.63% |
| Against | 11.37% |

A three-part referendum was held in Ecuador on 26 November 2006, alongside the run-off for the presidential elections. Voters were asked whether they approved of a ten-year plan for education, plans to improve healthcare provision, and using oil revenues for social and economic programmes. All three proposals were approved by wide margins.

== Background ==
On 10 August 2006 President Alfredo Palacio proposed a referendum with 15 questions. However, this was rejected by the National Assembly, as some proposals involved constitutional changes that required parliamentary approval. On 25 September Palacio issued decree 1871 putting forward three proposals to a referendum. This was approved by the Supreme Electoral Tribunal on 4 October, which also set the date of the referendum.

== Proposals ==
=== Ten year plan for education ===
The ten-year plan for education was put forward with eight main policies:

1. Providing universal education for 0–5 year olds.
2. Providing universal education from first to tenth grades.
3. Increasing the number of students studying towards the baccalaureate to at least 75%.
4. Eradicating illiteracy and strengthening adult education.
5. Improving the infrastructure and equipment of educational institutions.
6. Improving the quality and equity of education and implementing a national system of evaluation and social accountability within the education system.
7. Revaluing the teaching profession and improving the initial training, ongoing training, working conditions and quality of life of teachers.
8. Ensuring a 0.5% annual increase of education sector's share of GDP until 2012, or to at least 6% of GDP.

=== Improving healthcare provision ===
The healthcare proposals would require the National Assembly to approve a law that allocated sufficient financial resources to provide universal health insurance, and an annual increase of 0.5% in the share of GDP spent on healthcare until 2012 (or to a figure of at least 4% of GDP).

=== Use of oil revenues ===
The oil revenues proposal would require the National Assembly to pass laws within five months that ensured that any revenues from the oil industry that was not already allocated in the state budget would be used for social investment or revitalising the economy.

== Results ==
=== Ten year plan for education ===
| Choice | Votes | % |
|---|---|---|
| For | 4,491,145 | 91.58 |
| Against | 412,422 | 8.42 |
| Invalid/blank votes | 1,794,340 | – |
| Total | 6,697,907 | 100 |
| Registered voters/turnout | 9,021,773 | 75.52 |
Source: Direct Democracy

=== Improving healthcare provision ===
| Choice | Votes | % |
|---|---|---|
| For | 4,409,377 | 89.60 |
| Against | 511,608 | 10.40 |
| Invalid/blank votes | 1,750,376 | – |
| Total | 6,671,361 | 100 |
| Registered voters/turnout | 9,021,773 | 75.52 |
Source: Direct Democracy

=== Oil revenues ===
| Choice | Votes | % |
|---|---|---|
| For | 4,283,238 | 88.63 |
| Against | 549,286 | 11.37 |
| Invalid/blank votes | 1,838,419 | – |
| Total | 6,670,943 | 100 |
| Registered voters/turnout | 9,021,773 | 75.52 |
Source: Direct Democracy
