= Rocío González Navas =

Ecuadorian First Lady

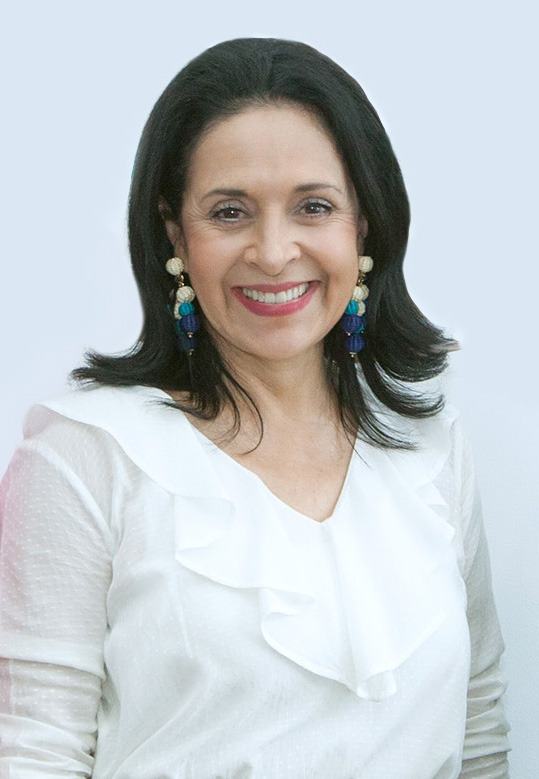

First Lady of Ecuador
- In role May 24, 2017 – May 24, 2021
- Preceded by: Anne Malherbe Gosselin
- Succeeded by: María de Lourdes Alcívar

Personal details
- Born: November 6, 1953 (age 72) Latacunga, Ecuador
- Spouse: Lenín Moreno (m. 1974)
- Children: 3
- Occupation: Businesswoman

Rocío González Navas (born November 6, 1953) is an Ecuadorian businesswoman. She was the First Lady of Ecuador from 2017 until 2021 as the wife of President Lenín Moreno.

== Biography ==
Rocío González Navas is the first-born daughter of police colonel Oswaldo González Lalama and Graciela Navas. She has two siblings – Oswaldo and Gissela. She also has three half-siblings from her father's later relationships out of marriage – Soraya and Judith González Sánchez and Oswaldo González Flores.

In addition to Cotopaxi, a province in whose capital she was born and grew up, González's family also has roots in other areas in the center of the country such as Tungurahua, where her paternal grandmother Judith Lalama Jaramillo was chosen beauty queen of Ambato in the city's Festival of Fruits and Flowers.

Without going through higher education, González's professional life began in the world of private banking. She and her husband created a company aimed at promoting the tourism sector, and she currently also serves as director of the magazine Guía de Oro Ecuador.

== Marriage and children ==
González met businessman Lenín Moreno at a Carnival party, and after a year of courtship they got married on October 4, 1974. On January 3, 1998, Moreno was shot during an attempted robbery, leaving him unable to walk. Since then González has been an important pillar of his recovery.

The couple have three daughters – Irina, Cristina, and Carina, famously known among Ecuadorians as the "Inas" for having the same ending and infamously related to the "INA Papers" Scandal.

== Public life ==
=== Second Lady ===
When Rafael Correa won the 2006 presidential election, his running mate Lenín Moreno automatically became Vice President. This was Rocío González's first brush with Ecuadorian political life. She actively contributed to the comprehensive care project for people with disabilities, and to the Manuela Espejo Solidarity Mission, focusing mainly on the accompaniment of families and educational inclusion through recreation.

During the short period that Moreno served as Acting President, since Correa had requested leave for the 2013 presidential campaign, González accompanied him to Chile in January of that year for a summit between CELAC and the European Union. Her travel was paid with budget of the government.

After leaving the vice presidency, Moreno claimed he would retire from public life until 2015 when, facing the 2017 presidential elections, President Rafael Correa trusted him as ally because of his rather calm image. He was appointed special UN envoy for disability issues, and settled for more than a year in a luxurious apartment on Quai Wilson Street in Geneva, Switzerland, together with Rocío and their daughter Irina. For that apartment he also received luxurious furniture valuated in more than 15.000 EUR from an off-shore company that benefited from a contract facilitated by Moreno.

=== First Lady ===
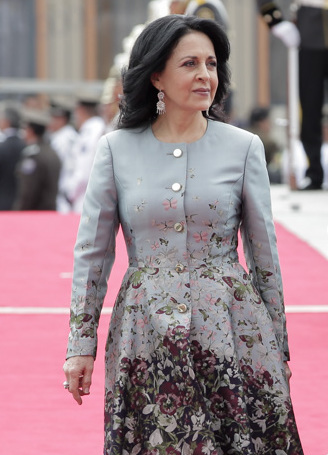
At her husband's inauguration in 2017

Although the formal position of First Lady was suppressed during Rafael Correa's presidency (2007–2017) for it being undemocratic and anachronistic; therefore, his wife Anne Malherbe did not exercise any governmental function, during the 2017 presidential campaign González showed vehemently her interest in occupying this role to support her husband in this way, although she maintained the rejection of the title itself.

In several interviews given to the media during the campaign, González said that if her husband won she would like to be involved mainly in issues of female empowerment and in the Manuela Espejo Mission, which helps people in vulnerable situations, especially those with some type of disability. In another area, she said she would like to support the tourism sector through the UN guidelines for sustainable tourism, involving the community and women artisans and entrepreneurs.

After her husband took office in May 2017, she was appointed delegate of the Presidency to head the Inter-institutional Committee of the Whole Life Plan, a flagship project of the social area promised in the campaign, serving in the position without any remuneration. So far this project has had very little success nor achievement in terms of it was expected. As part of her activities, she accompanies the President on various government paid international tours in which she talks about her experiences on the project with other authorities and first ladies, as she did in September 2017 during the inauguration of the 72nd session of the United Nations General Assembly in New York. Governmentally, she is referred to as First Lady.

Housing for All was part of the political program Lenin Moreno promised to the population; it was told to provide 400.000 houses in his four-year term, however, by its second year, it has barely reached 30.000. The presidency of this important program was appointed by Moreno to the First Lady. She works together with the Ministry of Urban Development and Housing, González has brought together the wives of mayors and prefects throughout the country to coordinate actions on a national scale. Similarly, she seeks constant support from international institutions such as the United Nations Development Programme, UN Women, UNICEF, the World Food Programme, the World Bank, and the World Tourism and Health Organizations.

She promotes the model of community intervention which seeks the strengthening of the integral development of beneficiary families of the Mission "Casa para Todos" (A House for All), which gradually has transformed in the heart of the "Plan Toda una Vida", ensuring the access to quality housing in a safe and healthy environment.

== Controversies ==
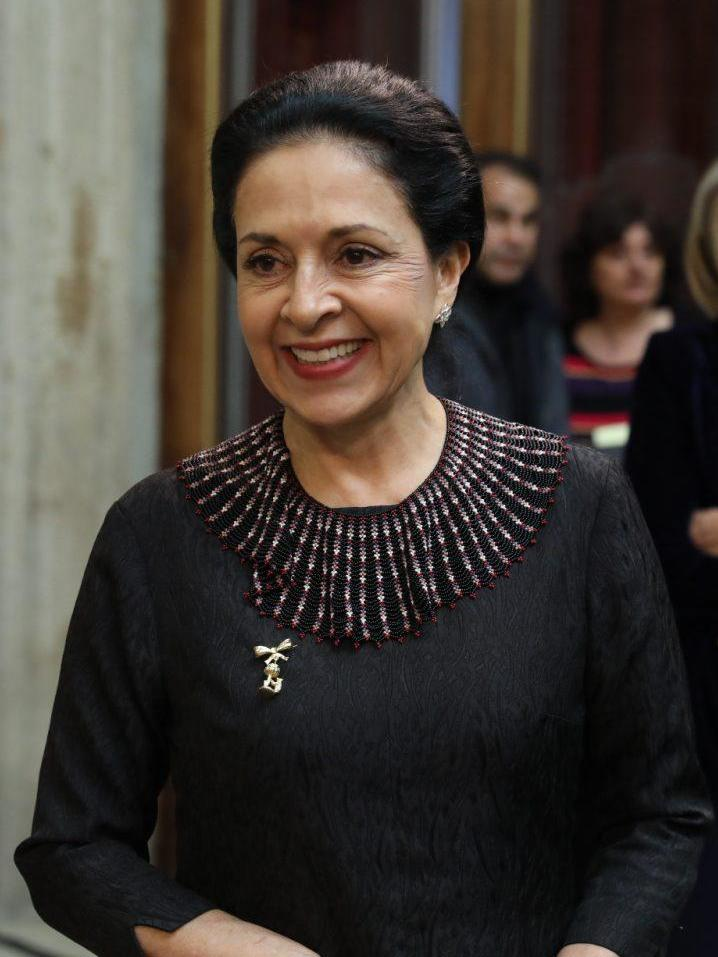
Attending the presentation of the Golden Key of Madrid

González has been strongly criticized by a sector of the population that had become accustomed to the absence of the figure of First Lady in the Ecuadorian Government, considering it irrelevant and vain for modern times. This has led to several attacks against her, especially with regard to her wardrobe and the origin of the money to support her tastes in that area.

One of the angriest criticisms originated with a purported news clip spread on social media about a traffic stoppage that González caused on Madrid's Gran Vía in order to make purchases, while accompanying her husband as part of his first presidential tour of Europe in December 2017. However the rumor was immediately denied by the radio station whose name had been used without authorization to spread the false news.

Since 2023, Ecuadorian prosecutors have been investigating Rocío González and her husband for the alleged crime of bribery related to the Coca Codo Sinclair hydroelectric project.
