= María Beatriz Paret =

Ecuadorian physician who served as the first lady between 2005 and 2007

First Lady of Ecuador
- In role April 20, 2005 – January 15, 2007
- Preceded by: Ximena Bohórquez
- Succeeded by: Anne Malherbe Gosselin

Personal details
- Born: María Beatriz Paret Lértora Guayaquil, Ecuador
- Spouse: Alfredo Palacio
- Children: 4
- Occupation: Physician

María Beatriz Paret Lértora is an Ecuadorian physician who served as the First Lady of Ecuador from April 20, 2005, to January 15, 2007, as the wife of President Alfredo Palacio.

== Biography ==
María Beatriz Paret was born in Guayaquil. She qualified as a pediatrician.

She married Alfredo Palacio in a ceremony held in Guayaquil. They have had four children together.

She moved to Miami in 1999 to care for her grandchildren and to run a preschool. She returned to Ecuador when her husband was elected President in 2005.

== First Lady ==
As the First Lady of Ecuador, Paret was president of the National Institute for Children and the Family (INNFA). She also served in the traditional role of hostess of Carondelet Palace and her husband's companion at various ceremonial events at the national and international level.

During her tenure with the INNFA, she achieved a greater budget allocation, drawing 3.5% of oil revenues, increasing to 5% toward the end of her term. She promoted the Universal Health Insurance Plan (AUS), which was intended to provide all Ecuadorians access to health insurance within five years. In November 2006, she signed an agreement to provide money for food and social services for minor children of prison inmates.

She has been a fierce opponent of human trafficking. In her speech at the 2006 conference "Women's Leadership in Latin America and the Caribbean", organized by Vital Voices Global Partnership and the University of Miami, she stated, "These are the true slaves of the 21st century", and "The definitive and complete answer will be to promote real changes in our countries, to develop State policies that give priority to social investment, the protection of children, and the reduction of poverty." She also established a partnership with the Ricky Martin Foundation to operate a hotline for complaints about human trafficking.

She was twice accused of using public funds to make personal trips, but the government justified the travel expenses as part of her work as First Lady.
