= Alejandro Serrano =

Vice President of Ecuador from 2005 to 2007

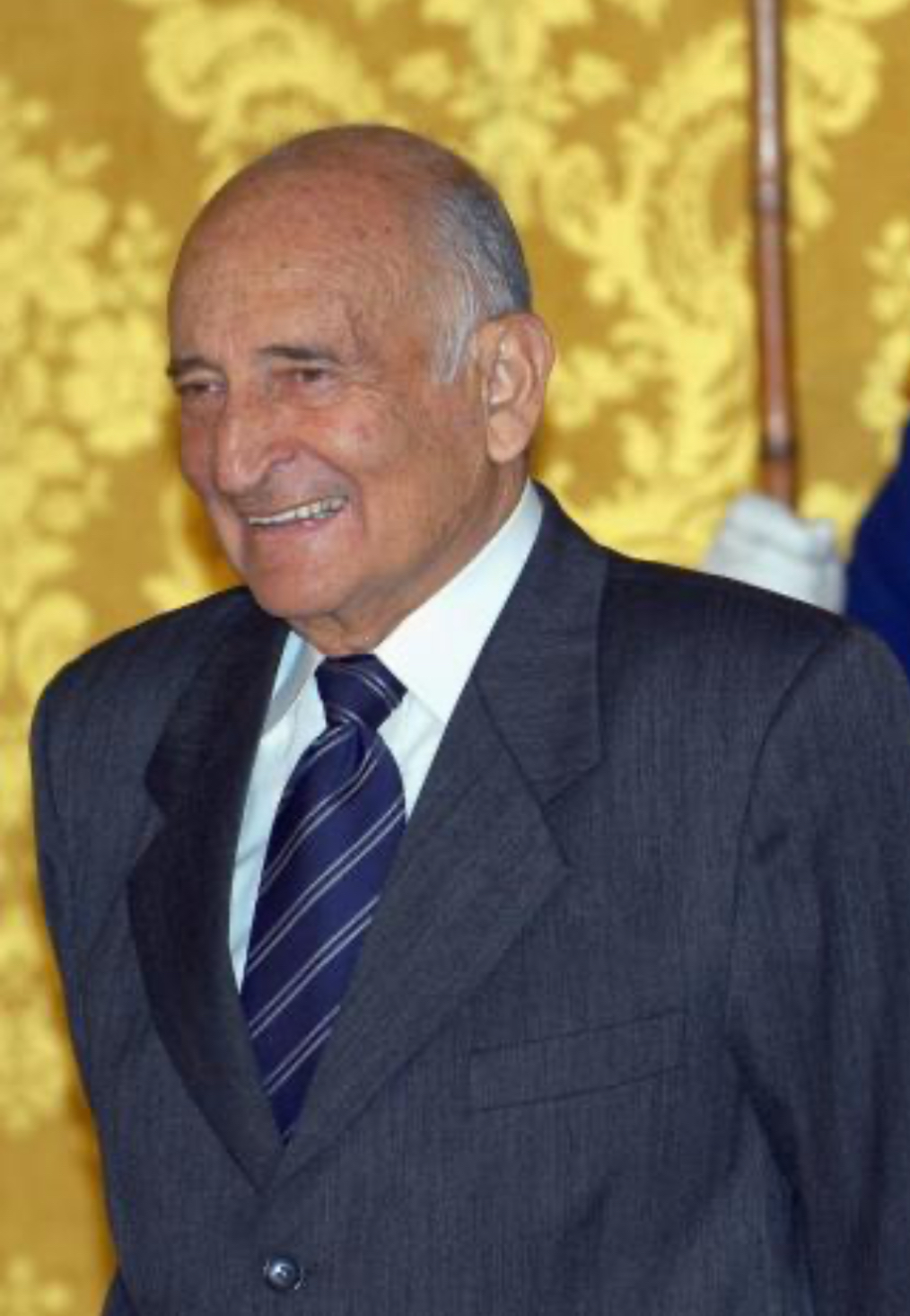
- Serrano in 2005

46th Vice President of Ecuador
- In office 5 May 2005 – 15 January 2007
- President: Alfredo Palacio
- Preceded by: Alfredo Palacio
- Succeeded by: Lenín Moreno

Mayor of Cuenca
- In office 1 September 1970 – 30 April 1977
- Preceded by: Ricardo Muñoz Chávez
- Succeeded by: Leoncio Cordero Jaramillo

Governor of Azuay
- In office 23 January 1959 – 31 August 1960
- President: Camilo Ponce Enríquez
- Preceded by: Augusto Tamariz Valdivieso
- Succeeded by: Olmedo Malo Andrade

Personal details
- Born: Nicanor Alejandro Serrano Aguilar; 13 January 1933 Azogues, Ecuador
- Died: 6 August 2019 (aged 86) Cuenca, Ecuador
- Party: Independent
- Other political affiliations: Conservative Party
- Spouse: Ana Cordero Acosta
- Education: University of Cuenca

Nicanor Alejandro Serrano Aguilar (13 January 1933 – 6 August 2019) was an Ecuadorian politician and sports leader.

Serrano was Vice President of Ecuador from May 5, 2005 to January 15, 2007, in the presidency of Alfredo Palacio. He was also Governor of Azuay during the presidency of Camilo Ponce (1956-1960); deputy for Azuay, councilman, and Mayor of Cuenca from 1970 to 1977.

== Biography ==
Serrano was educated at Escuela de los Hermanos Cristianos, then went on to junior and senior high school at the Colegio de los Padres Jesuitas. For the completion of secondary education, he entered the Faculty of Philosophy and Literature at the University of Cuenca, and then to the Faculty of Civil Engineering at the same university. He held two Ph.D. degrees one in Philosophy and Literature and the other in engineering and civil engineering.

He was one of the founders of Deportivo Cuenca in 1971, when he was mayor of the city of Cuenca.

Serrano was Vice President of Ecuador from May 5, 2005 to January 15, 2007. The National Congress of Ecuador elected him to fill the vacancy of the Vice-presidency when Alfredo Palacio became President of Ecuador.

Serrano worked as a lecturer at several schools, namely in Coegio Rafael Borja, Colegio Benigno Malo, Garaicoa Colegio, Colegio Rosa de Jesús Cordero, Colegio Fray Vicente Solano (served as president), then served as dean of the Faculty of Philosophy and Literature at the University of Cuenca and also taught at the Faculty of Law, University del Azuay in society. Serrano served as a board member of Canton Cuenca and later as a member of the House of Representatives at the provincial level in the province of Azuay. Later he was elected governor of the Azuay Province and then twice served as provincial deputy in the National Parliament. Serrano also served as mayor of Cuenca. Serrano was married and had four children.

Political offices
| Preceded by Alfredo Palacio | Vice President of Ecuador; 2005–2007 | Succeeded by Lenín Moreno |
