= National Unity Bridge =

Bridge complex in Ecuador

Coordinates: 2°9′31″S 79°51′18″W

The National Unity Bridge (Puente de la Unidad Nacional) is a bridge complex in northeastern Guayaquil, Ecuador with a length of 2,186 metres (7,172 ft). The National Unity Bridge crosses the Daule River and Babahoyo River, which combine to form the Guayas River immediately downstream. The bridge complex consists of four individual bridges: two parallel bridges across the Daule River (the Rafael Mendoza Avilés Bridge and the Carlos Pérez Peraso Bridge) and two parallel bridges across the Babahoyo River, along with a road in La Puntilla, Samborondón that links each set of bridges. The bridge connects the city of Guayaquil with Durán to its east, and by extension to the highland part of Ecuador. Construction of the National Unity Bridge commenced on 23 March 1967, and the bridge was inaugurated on 9 October 1970.
