= Naya o La Chapetona =

1900 novel by Manuel Belisario Moreno

Naya o La Chapetona (1900) is a novel by the Ecuadorian priest Manuel Belisario Moreno.

== Monument in Zamora ==
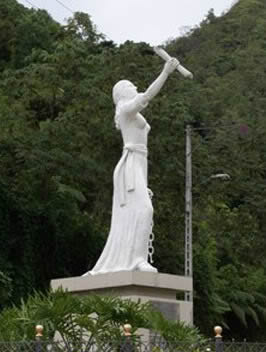
A monument of "Naya o la Chapetona" in Zamora, Ecuador

In 2004 the Ecuadorian municipality of Zamora constructed, and placed in the center of town, a monument of "Naya o la Chapetona" the protagonist of the novel of the same name. Mayor Eugenio Reyes announced that the design of the monument was created by the sculptor Luis Viracocha of Quito. The monument is approximate 6 meters in height.
