= Corruption in Ecuador =

Corruption in Ecuador is a serious problem. According to a report by Adam Zuckerman, "institutionalized graft has become a driving force" of Ecuador's economy, and this graft is "flourishing in a vacuum of transparency or accountability". The same report indicated that "the entire business class of Guayaquil" owns offshore bank accounts. David Rosero, a member of the opposition party and a member of Ecuador's Council for Citizen Participation, has stated that $2 billion is lost annually to corruption.

== Indicators ==
On Transparency International's 2025 Corruption Perceptions Index, Ecuador scored 33 on a scale from 0 ("highly corrupt") to 100 ("very clean"). When ranked by score, Ecuador ranked 116th among the 182 countries in the Index, where the country ranked first is perceived to have the most honest public sector. For comparison with regional scores, the best score among the countries of the Americas (Note: Argentina, Bahamas, Barbados, Belize, Bolivia, Brazil, Canada, Chile, Colombia, Costa Rica, Cuba, Dominica, Dominican Republic, Ecuador, El Salvador, Grenada, Guatemala, Guyana, Haiti, Honduras, Jamaica, Mexico, Nicaragua, Panama, Paraguay, Peru, Saint Lucia, Saint Vincent and the Grenadines, Suriname, Trinidad and Tobago, United States of America, Uruguay, Venezuela) was 75, the average score was 42 and the worst score was 10. For comparison with worldwide scores, the best score was 89 (ranked 1), the average score was 42, and the worst score was 9 (ranked 181, in a two-way tie).

A 2014 report by the Organization of American States urged the Ecuadoran Prosecutor's Office to remove barriers to processing corruption complaints and prosecutions.

== Background ==
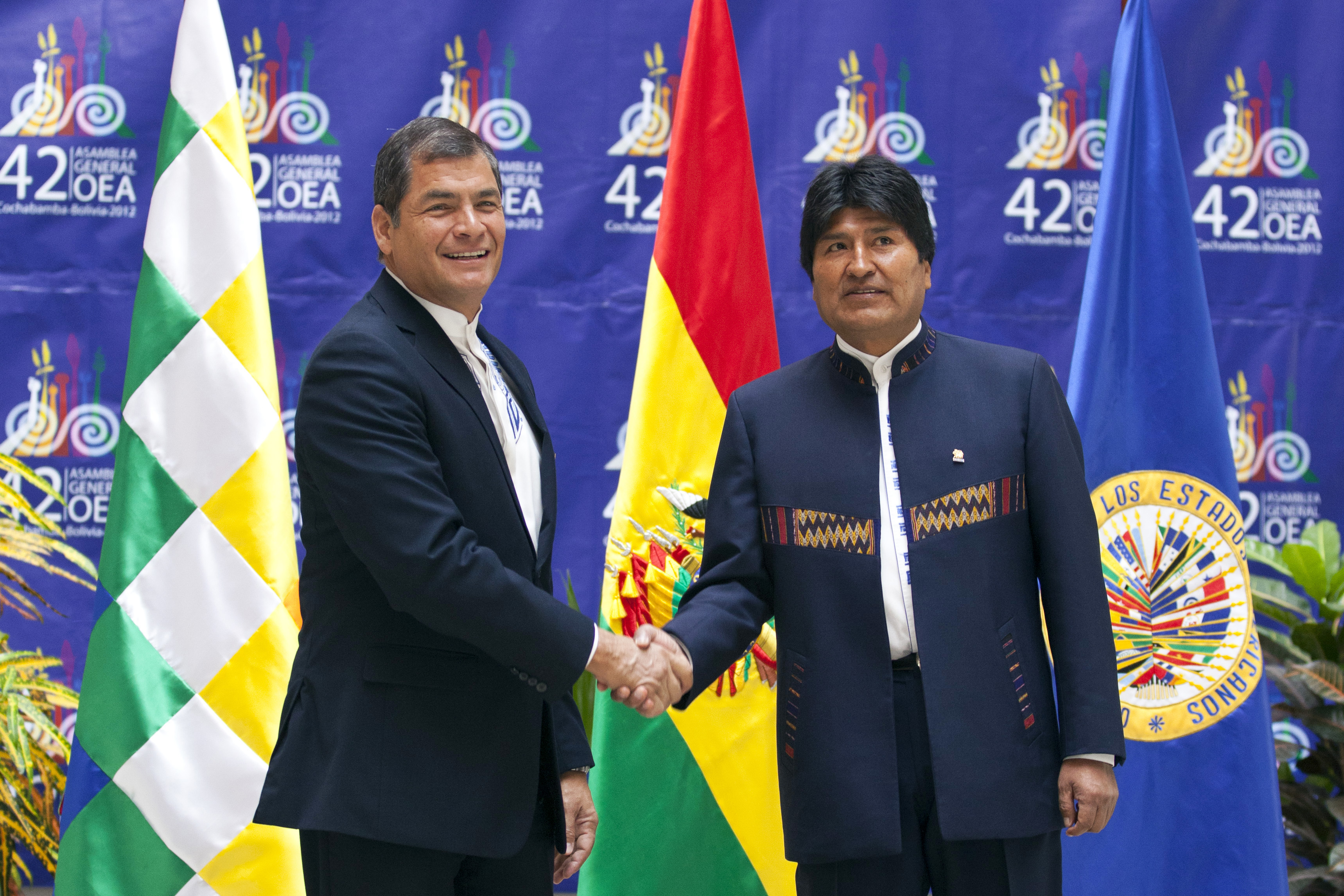
President Rafael Correa with Bolivian president Evo Morales

When Rafael Correa took office as president in 2007, he announced a “revolution against corruption.” Only five weeks into his tenure, Correa undermined the Civic Anti-Corruption Commission, formed in 1998, by establishing the National Anticorruption Secretariat, which gave public officials the job of investigating corruption. Ten months later, he abolished the commission entirely and replaced it with the Council for Citizen Participation and Social Control. This council, which was entirely under his personal control, was placed above the National Anticorruption Secretariat and diluted its powers.

During its first six years, the Secretariat reportedly refused to say how many corruption complaints it had processed. In 2011, the Secretariat stated that it was aware of 1412 active cases, 442 within the Secretariat's jurisdiction and 970 under the jurisdiction of other government sectors, and that there was also a three-year backlog of 3,500 cases.

According to one source, the Council for Citizen Participation does not, in practice, actually investigate corruption charges. Moreover, it has had the power since 2009 to appoint the Attorney General and other top government officials, and its appointees have included persons accused of corruption, such as Attorney General Galo Chiriboga, who was charged with forgery.

A 2011 referendum approved constitutional changes to increase Correa's powers over the media and the judiciary. The vote temporarily replaced the Judicial Council, an independent body that appointed, promoted, and fired judges, with a transition council appointed partly by the president, which fired scores of judges in August and September 2011.

In 2013, Correa instituted something called the National Plan for the Prevention and Fight Against Corruption 2013-2017, which has been called “a complete nonstarter" by critics.

== Government ==
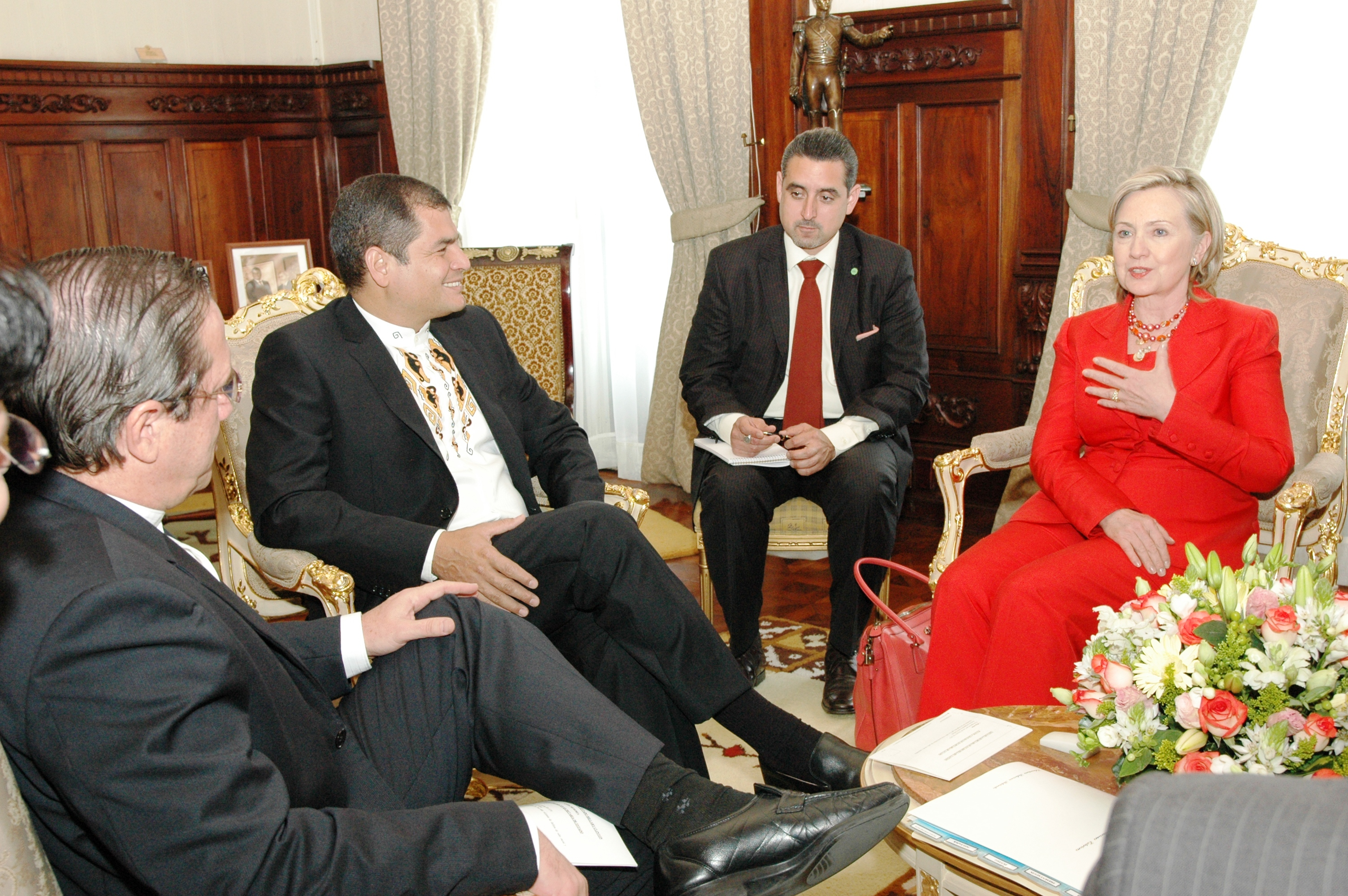
President Correa meets with former Secretary Hillary Clinton

Observers have characterized Ecuador's government as lacking any transparency. It is alleged that Ecuadoran officials engage in corruption with impunity. Many officials have been accused of corruption and never been cleared, or have undergone “unconvincing trials” at the end of which they go unpunished. Leading officials who have been at the center of corruption scandals in recent years have included Foreign Minister Ricardo Patiño; Pedro Delgado, a cousin of the president; and Patricio Pazmiño, President of the Constitutional Court, who, despite corruption charges, was appointed to the Inter-American Court of Human Rights.

In 2008, Sports Minister Raul Carrion was accused of illegal enrichment and was charged with twelve counts of embezzlement. In 2014, the Riobamba mayor, Juan Salazar Lopez, stole over USD 13 million from the city's bank account. He was sentenced to eight years in prison for embezzlement. In 2015, Congresswoman Maria Esperanza Galván was arrested for allegedly requesting a $800,000 bribe from a company in exchange for public contracts in her district. Correa blamed opposition-party members of the Council for Citizen Participation for not fighting corruption adequately.

Correa's older brother, Fabricio, an engineer and president of Aplitec SA, is alleged to have received government contracts on which he collected about $700 million and overcharged by about $140 million. Fabricio sued the journalists who broke the story, and the president, who claimed he was unaware of the contracts, formed a special commission to investigate the case. When the commission concluded, in February 2011, that the president had known about the contracts, the president sued four members of the commission, two of whom ended up being charged with perjury by the Attorney General, who is also Correa's cousin. In the end, those two commission members were found guilty of perjury and imprisoned.

The so-called Panama Papers that were leaked in April 2016 showed that Correa and his brother owned an offshore company that was apparently being used for corrupt purposes. The Panama Papers also showed that the Attorney General "used offshore accounts to buy houses and properties".

Public access to official information is officially guaranteed, yet this guarantee is not enforced.

=== Presidency of Rafael Correa ===
In 2016, the United Nations Human Rights Committee (OHCHR) ruled that the former Ecuadorean president, Rafael Correa, violated the civil rights of two prominent bankers, Roberto and William Isaias. Correa's government confiscated the brothers’ businesses, which included one of the most successful banks in the country, and did not afford the two brothers any due process.

OHCHR ordered Ecuador to fully restore the seized properties to the Isaias brothers.

The ruling brings to light the depth of Correa's corruption and abuse of power. After seizing their businesses, Correa even went so far as to pass an amendment to the country's constitution openly directed at the Isaias men. The amendment (Mandate No. 13) made it expressly illegal for the brothers to file legal actions. It also said that any judge who even heard such a case would be dismissed. OHCHR ruled that Mandate No. 13 violated Isaias’s rights.

=== Government-led demise of Filanbanco ===
In 2010, author and professor Alberto Valencia Granada published a book called When Success is a Crime: Filanbanco: A Case of Violation of Human Rights in Ecuador. In the book, Valencia examines Ecuador's financial crisis of 1998–1999 and the subsequent actions by the Ecuadorian state to seize the Isaias family's businesses and persecute Roberto Isaias and William Isaias for false charges stemming from an untrue claim that the brothers had caused the economic crisis through their bank, Filanbanco.

=== Judiciary ===
"Corruption, inefficiency, and political influence have plagued the Ecuadorian judiciary for many years," stated Human Rights Watch in 2012. According to Freedom House, "Ecuador has long been racked by corruption", and the weak judicial oversight and investigative resources perpetuate a culture of impunity.

The Ecuadoran judiciary is allegedly subject to political interference, bribery, and other forms of corruption. Judges do not act independently, and judicial proceedings can be lengthy, confusing, and inconclusive. The system is compromised by the fact that the Judicial Council, the judiciary's governing body, is run by an intimate of Correa's, Gustavo Jalkh, who was the president's private secretary.

In 2011, the Inter-American Commission on Human Rights accused Ecuador of violating the due process of 27 Supreme Court justices dismissed by Congress in 2004. In 2015, U.S. Senator Patrick Leahy (D-VT) stated that "judicial independence is seriously compromised" in Ecuador.

U.S. District Judge Lewis Kaplan ruled in 2014 that an $18 billion pollution judgment against Chevron by an Ecuadoran court in 2011 had been the product of corruption. Attorney Steven Donziger and his legal team, according to Kaplan, had "used bribery, fraud and extortion" to win the case for his clients, a group of Ecuadoran villagers. Evidence showed that the ruling issued by Ecuadoran judge Nicolas Zambrano had been copied word for word from internal documents held by the plaintiff's lawyers. Kaplan's decision blocked the plaintiffs from collecting the award in the U.S.

In outtakes from a film submitted to the court by Chevron, Donziger was shown saying that in Ecuador, "there are a thousand people around the courthouse; you will get whatever you want," his point being that many courthouse employees were prepared to take bribes in exchange for a favorable verdict.

Purga Case

The Purga Case refers to a significant legal proceeding in Ecuador, where the Attorney General's Office has filed charges against numerous government officials and legal practitioners. The aim is to uncover the interconnections between politics, the judiciary, and the narcotics trade.

Diana Salazar, the Attorney General of Ecuador, emphasized that the Purga Case highlights how corruption infiltrated the highest echelons of legislative politics. This corruption facilitated collusion with drug trafficking networks and influenced the administration of justice, particularly in the influential province of Guayas. Consequently, criminal enterprises found a lucrative avenue for impunity to thrive.

According to Salazar, the Purga Case illustrates how these corrupt practices compromised the integrity of the justice system in Guayas, enabling criminal economies to operate with impunity. The case underscores the urgent need for reforms to prevent such abuses of power and uphold the rule of law.

=== Police ===
Ecuador's police have been accused of corruption. In 2008, after the U.S. Embassy in Quito concluded that then commander of the National Police, Jaime Aquilino Hurtado, had “used his power...to extort, accumulating money and property, facilitate human trafficking, and obstruct investigations against corrupt peers,” the U.S. State Department revoked the U.S. entry visas of Hurtado and his family. These alleged corrupt activities began before Hurtado was named commander, and U.S. authorities believed that Correa was aware of them when he appointed Hurtado to that position. The help Hurtado gave to human traffickers was believed to have enabled criminals and terrorists to enter the U.S. Among Hurtado's accomplices was a police chief, Bolivar Villota, whom he hired to develop a resort he owned. Villota was arrested in 2007 for extortion but Hurtado managed to keep him in office. Two other police officers, Milton Raul Andrade and Manuel Fernando Basantes, were found to be involved in smuggling immigrants, mostly Chinese, into the U.S. Hurtado, who was also a part of this racket, protected those officers, too.

=== Human rights ===
In 2014, the U.S. Department of State identified Ecuador's corruption as a significant human rights concern.

=== Customs ===
Ecuador's customs system has been criticized by the Business Anti-Corruption Portal as highly corrupt, especially when importing rather than exporting, and irregular payments are common.

=== Public services ===
According to the Business Anti-Corruption Portal, the public services sector suffers from major corruption, marked by bribery and facilitation payments. Burdensome regulations and inefficient bureaucracy abound.

=== Public procurement ===
Ecuador's public procurement sector is also accused of corruption, with a high level of favoritism and kickbacks, and with funds often being diverted irregularly to connected companies and individuals, according to a report by the Business Anti-Corruption Portal.

The major recent public procurement case during the Correa years involved the awarding of government contracts worth $167 million to Correa's brother, Fabricio.

=== National resources sector ===
The natural resources sector supposedly involves a rather high risk of illegal activity. The extractive industries, which make up more than half of Ecuador's exports, have been characterized by a lack of transparency in regard to money and environmental impact data.

A June 2016 report indicated that Ecuador's government-owned oil firm, Petroecuador, was the center of “a thriving culture of corruption” involving “oil executives, middlemen, and government officials,” who were enriching themselves through illegal “commissions” on oil being shipped to PetroChina in exchange for loans and credit. “The China-Ecuador loan deals,” noted the report, “have created a climate of corruption on all sides.”

=== Taxation ===
Ecuador's tax system can reportedly make it difficult to do business in the country. The system has been considered untrustworthy, the tax laws change frequently, many companies evade taxes, and filing taxes is unusually time-consuming.

=== Property rights ===
Although Ecuadoran law guarantees property rights, in practice, they are often unprotected, and the government is alleged to threaten embargo or nationalization to pressure companies.

=== NGOs ===
Correa has been accused of seeking to increase his power over domestic and international NGOs. He expanded the executive's authority over them in a 2011 presidential decree, and shortly afterwards used his new authority to expel 16 foreign NGOs from the country.

== Media ==
In 2014, the Superintendency of Information and Communication (SUPERCOM) ordered changes in a cartoon in El Universo criticizing government corruption, and fined the newspaper as well.

Businesses are reported to avoid association with opposition media for fear of government reprisals.

== Business ==
Corruption has been reported as a major problem for businesses investing in Ecuador. The public services and procurement sectors are characterized by endemic corruption, with bribery and “facilitation payments” being widespread, according to the Business Anti-Corruption Portal.

About a third of Ecuadoran companies are not registered, and thus operate outside the regulatory framework, which exacerbates corruption.

=== Petty corruption ===
In 2016, Kathleen Peddicord wrote in U.S. News that small-scale corruption is widespread in Ecuador. “I've been short-changed in Ecuador dozens of times over the years,” she wrote. “Each time, the wrong change was politely explained as an honest mistake, but the mistake has never been in my favor. On the other hand, in Uruguay, Chile and Colombia, I've never been short-changed in all the years I've spent time in those countries.”

== Anti-corruption efforts ==
Ecuador has many laws against corruption and several bodies that are tasked with fighting it, but these laws and bodies are criticized as having been weakened during the Correa presidency, with only a tiny percentage of Ecuadorans considering the government's anti-corruption agencies effective.

Officially, bribing government employees, influence peddling, embezzlement, illicit enrichment, and extortion are banned by the Comprehensive Organic Criminal Code, Chapter 5, Section 3, and by the Ecuadorian Constitution. The Constitution requires Ecuadorans to report acts of corruption. Laws are technically in place to sanction public officials who request or receive gifts, privileges, or advantages with their power. The Comptroller General and other government entities are empowered to probe and prosecute cases of corruption involving public contracts.

The Criminal Code, passed in 2014, contains anti-corruption language. Both this code and the Ecuadorian Constitution (Article 233) criminalize bribery, influence peddling, embezzlement, and illegal enrichment and extortion. Facilitation payments are banned under Article 280 of the Criminal Code. Bribery is punishable under that Article by up to seven years in prison. Under Article 278, embezzlement is punishable by up to 13 years and by a lifetime ban on seeking public office. Under Articles 285 and 286, influence peddling is punishable by three to five years. Under Article 279, unlawful enrichment is punishable by up to 10 years. Under Article 281, extortion is punishable by up to seven years. Corporations are not subject to punishment for corruption.

The Public Prosecutor's Office is in charge of enforcing anti-corruption laws and prosecuting corruption. The Comptroller General controls, supervises, and audits acts by government employees, and in principle has the power to remove and sanction corrupt individuals and report them to the Public Prosecutor's Office. The Counsil of Citizen Participation and Social Control is tasked with promoting transparency, investigating corruption, and requesting judicial actions against corrupt individuals. The Counsil exercises its anti-corruption efforts through the Secretariat for Transparency and the Fight against Corruption. The Technical Secretariat for Transparency Management coordinates and executes transparency policies in the executive branch, and “create[s] strategies for investigating, processing and reporting corruption issues to the relevant public entities.”

There is a Law for the Control of Money Laundering and there are financial disclosure laws as well. There are no laws against bribing foreign officials.

Ecuador has ratified the United Nations Convention Against Corruption (UNCAC) and the Inter-American Convention Against Corruption (IACAC), though it has not enacted the chief requirements of the IACAC. In addition, Ecuador is a participant in the Andean Plan of Action Against Corruption. In December 2014, Ecuador, along with other Latin American and Caribbean countries, issued the Quito Declaration, which emphasized the importance of combating corruption more seriously. Ecuador has also signed reciprocal corruption-fighting agreements with Belgium, Cuba, Mexico, and other countries.

== See also ==
- International Anti-Corruption Academy
- Group of States Against Corruption
- International Anti-Corruption Day
- ISO 37001 Anti-bribery management systems
- United Nations Convention against Corruption
- OECD Anti-Bribery Convention
- Transparency International
