= Emelec =

Emelec can refer to:

- Empresa Eléctrica del Ecuador, a former Ecuadorian electric company
- C.S. Emelec, an Ecuadorian sports club
