= George Capwell =

American businessman (1902–1970)

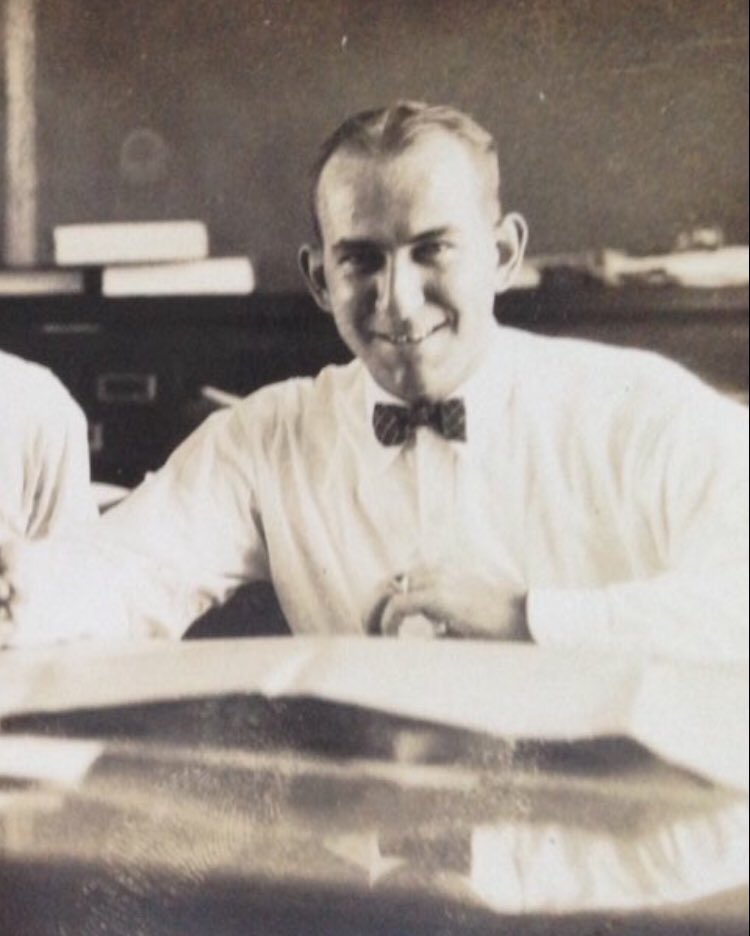

Personal information
- Full name: George Lewis Capwell Cronin
- Date of birth: July 1, 1902
- Place of birth: Olean, New York, U.S.
- Date of death: 7 January 1970 (aged 67)
- Height: 1.80 m (5 ft 11 in)

Senior career*
Years	Team	Apps	(Gls)
1929–1946	Emelec		

Managerial career
- 1929–1946: Emelec
- * Club domestic league appearances and goals

George Lewis Capwell Cronin (July 1, 1902 – January 7, 1970), was an American manager of the Empresa Eléctrica del Ecuador ("Electric Company of Ecuador") in Guayaquil, Ecuador, founded Club Sport Emelec, a sports club, in 1929. Emelec, named for the first syllable of each word in the company's name, is one of Ecuador's leading football clubs.

== Biography ==
Capwell was born on July 1, 1902, in Olean, New York. He was known for his love of athletics, particularly American football, basketball, swimming, and baseball. When he was young, he lived for a time in Panama, where his father was an engineer involved in the construction of the Panama Canal.

He studied electrical engineering at Rensselaer Polytechnic Institute. After graduating, he took a job as an assistant engineer at a power plant in Cienfuegos, Cuba. He later spent time in Panama.

Standing over 1.8 meters (5.9 ft) tall and weighing over 91 kilograms (200 lb), Capwell was noted for his organizational and leadership skills.

== Emelec ==
Capwell arrived in Guayaquil to work at Eléctrica on April 14, 1926. Soon after arriving, he founded a sports club, named for the first syllable of each word in the company's name: Emelec. He boxed and played basketball at the guard position; he organized basketball competitions at the company in 1927. He played the catcher's position in baseball games. Potential members of the boxing club had to perform well in a fight against one of the club's experienced boxers in order to gain membership.

Capwell was not particularly interested in association football, but a request from the employees led him to found a team, particularly since the workers were not particularly enthusiastic about Emelec's other sports.

The football team, composed solely of Eléctrica workers, was founded on April 28, 1929. On September 17, 1929, the team—with Capwell on the field—defeated Vanguard 14–12 at a tournament in Guayaquil. It won its first title, a local league made up of business-backed teams in Guayaquil, in 1933.

Emelec became Ecuador's first national football champions in 1957, and as of 2021 they have won 14 national titles.

Emelec currently plays in the Estadio George Capwell, built in 1945 in Guayaquil. Capwell played in the first game staged in the stadium, a baseball match against Oriente.
