= Constituent Mandate 13 =

Constituent Mandate 13 was an amendment to the Ecuadorian Constitution passed by the Ecuadorian government in 2007. The purpose of the mandate was to seize properties owned by The Isaias Group for the stated purpose of reimbursing former depositors of Filanbanco SA, a bank that the Ecuadorian government acquired which then went bankrupt during the government's ownership of it.

Constituent Mandate 13 was the constitutional norm that Rafael Correa, former president of Ecuador, secured from his country's Constituent Assembly, in order to justify the illegal confiscation of GAMMA VISION, TC TELEVISION and other media companies (over 200 companies illegally seized) owned by The Isaias Group.

Mandate 13 was solely dedicated to the Isaias businesses and includes the statement that the administrative resolution used to confiscate their properties. It even contained a clause warning that any judge or magistrate in Ecuador who ruled in favor of the Isaias brothers would be removed from the bench and open to criminal prosecution:

"... is not subject to actions for the protection of constitutional rights or to any other actions of a special nature. Judges or magistrates evoking any kind of constitutional action related to this resolution ... shall dismiss it under pain of removal from the bench and without prejudice of such criminal liability as may be incurred."

== Official wording ==
The text of Mandate 13 is as follows:

WHEREAS,

That the Constituent Assembly in article 1 of the Mandate No. 1, approved in the session of the plenary on November 29, 2007 and published in the Supplement of the Official Registry No. 223 on Friday, November 2007, assumes and exercises the PLENARY POWERS:

That article 1 of the Functioning Regulation of the Constituent Assembly of December 11, 2007, published in the Supplement of the Official Registry No. 236 on December 20, 2007, orders "the Constituent Assembly represents the popular sovereignty which is located in the Ecuadorean people; and its own nature is granted plenary powers;

That article 2, number 2 of the Functioning Regulation of the Constituent Assembly, orders "In the exercise of its powers the Constituent Assembly will approve...2 Constituent Mandates: decisions and norms expedited by the Constituent Assembly for the exercise of its plenary powers. These mandates will be effective immediately, without prejudice of its publication in the respective organ.

That the failure of the financial system in the 90s caused enormous losses to the Ecuadorean state, the same which were assumed by all the Ecuadoreans and which up until today have not been paid in their totality.

That the Agency of Guaranteed Deposits, in its capacity as judges of Co-actives, through Resolution AGD-UIO-GG-2008-12 of July 18, 2008, in light of the estimated losses of $661,500,000 dollars against the ex-shareholders of Filanbanco SA ordered the immediate confiscation of various of their properties in accordance with that ordered in article 29 reformed by the Reordering Law on Economic Matter in the area of Tributary Finance.;

That the Constituent Assembly, supports the actions adopted by the constituted powers in the eradication of all forms of corruption and impunity as well as the freedom of expression in democracy, which will not be affected by this measure which has no direct relation with the referred liberty;

That the Constituent Assembly, in exercising its plenary powers and in the areas of social peace, has the obligation to guard the stability, rights and guarantees of the workers and the employees of companies intervened by the Agency of Guaranteed Deposits (AGD) through resolution AGD-UIO-GG-2008-12 of July 8, 2008; and

In the use of its attributes and faculties expedites the following:

CONSTITUENT MANDATE NO. 13

Article 1. Ratify the complete legal validity of the Resolution AGD-UIO-GG-2008-12 of July 8, 2008, where the confiscation of the property of the ex-shareholders and ex-administrators of Filanbanco SA is ordered with the finality of returning the money to the State and all of the Ecuadoreans that still remain damaged due to the bankruptcy of said bank.

== United Nations ruling ==
In 2016, the UN Human Rights Committee ruled that "Mandate 13", a measure quickly passed by the Ecuadorian legislature to approve seizure of The Isaias Group's assets, violated the right to due process of the Isaiah brothers, protected by Article 14 of the International Covenant on Civil and Political Rights, of which Ecuador is a subscriber.
