= Club Sport Emelec =

Ecuadorian sports club

Emelec
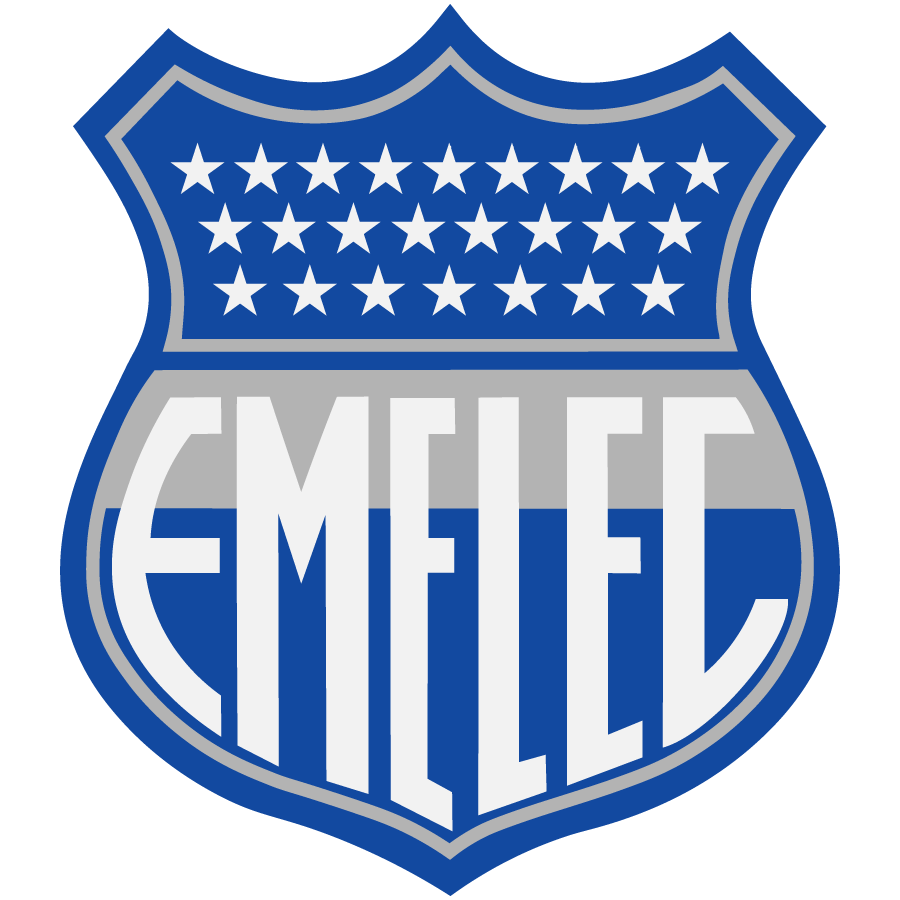
- Full name: Club Sport Emelec
- Nicknames: El Bombillo (The Lightbulb); El Ballet Azul (The Blue Ballet); El Equipo Millonario (The Millionaire Team)
- Founded: 28 April 1929; 97 years ago
- Ground: Estadio George Capwell
- Capacity: 40,020
- Honorary President: Enrique Ponce Luque, Elias Wated
- Chairman: Jorge Guzmán
- Manager: Ezequiel Medrán
- League: Ecuadorian Serie A
- 2025: First stage: 8th of 16; Second hexagonal: 4th of 6
- Website: www.emelec.com.ec
Home colours	Away colours	Third colours

Club Sport Emelec is an Ecuadorian sports club based in Guayaquil that is best known for their professional football team. The football team plays in the Ecuadorian Serie A, the highest level of professional football in the country.

Emelec has won fourteen Serie A titles and one of the division B, holding the record of doing so in all decades in which the Serie A has been played. They also have won seven regional titles (record in their region), a record-tying 5 of them in the professional era.

Emelec was founded on 28 April 1929 by George Capwell, the American head of the Electric Company of Ecuador (Spanish: Empresa Eléctrica del Ecuador), from which the club is named after. The name of their home stadium pays homage to the club's founder. The club's most intense rivalry is with crosstown-team Barcelona. Matches between the clubs are known as El Clásico del Astillero.

== History ==
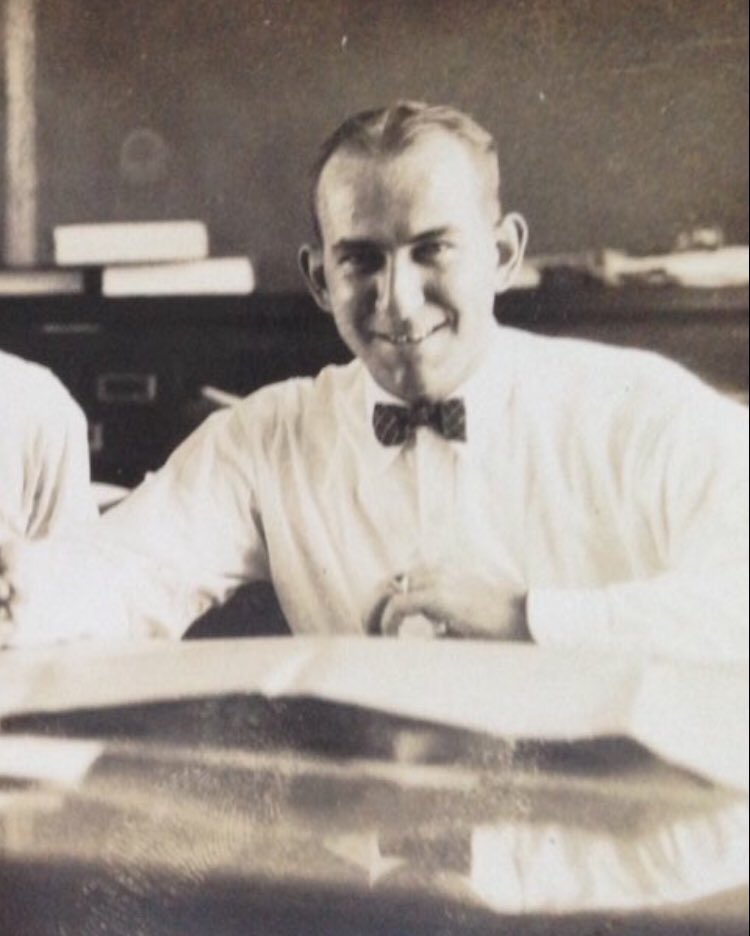
George Capwell, founding father of Club Sport Emelec

The club was founded after an assembly of employees at the Empresa Eléctrica del Ecuador, an electric company in Guayaquil, decided to start an amateur sports league. The initiative was spearheaded by George Capwell, the executive officer of the company who came from the United States. The first sports played in the club were baseball, basketball, boxing, swimming, handball, and football. Capwell did not enjoy football, so the sport was supported only by his employees in non-official but recognized championships. This changed in the 1940s, when Capwell finally lent his support, resulting in the club winning several official local championships, building their own stadium, and hosting the 1947 South American Championship entirely in it.

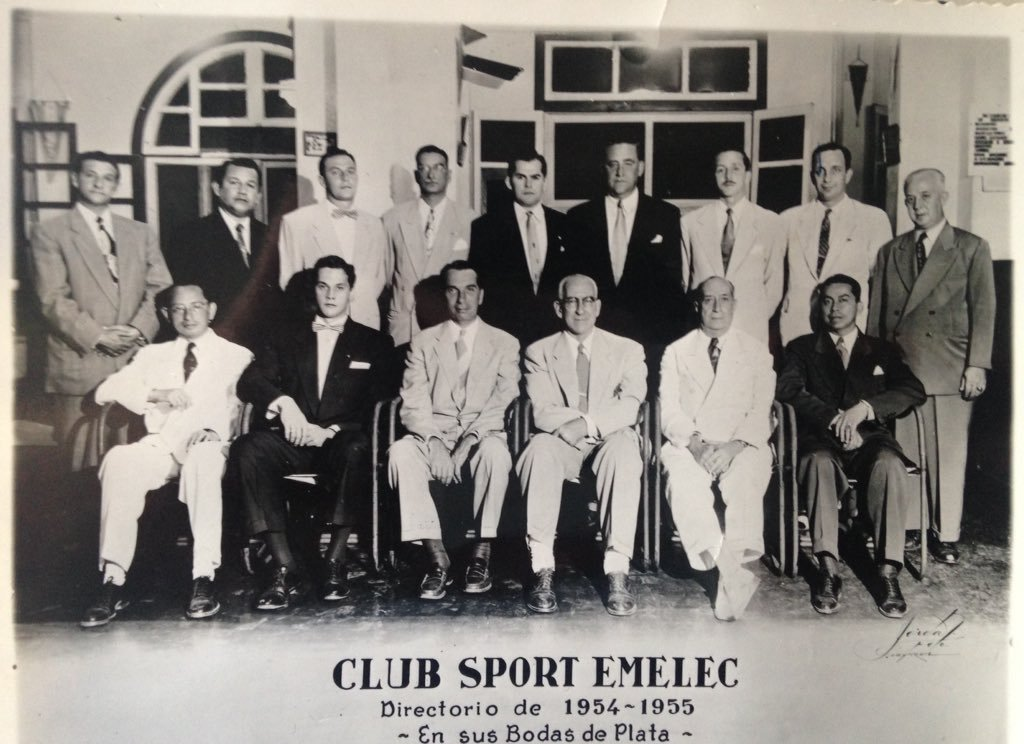
Emelec Directory 1954-1955.

In 1957, the club became the first national champions in football with a "dream team" that included Derek Haack, Cipriano Yu Lee, José Vicente Balseca, Cruz Ávila, Mariano Larraz, Carlos Alberto Raffo, Jaime Ubilla, Daniel Pinto, Rómulo Gómez and Suárez-Rizzo; they were coached by Eduardo "Tano" Spandre. Since then, they have accumulated thirteen more national titles, placing them 2nd in the national title count behind Barcelona with 15 titles and followed by El Nacional with 13. They have also won seven local titles (two in the amateur area and five in the professional era).

In the 1990s, the football team saw success internationally. In 1995, they reached the semi-finals of the Copa Libertadores; they lost to eventual champions Grêmio. In 2001, the team was close to becoming the first Ecuadorian club to win an international title when they were a finalist in the 2001 Copa Merconorte. In the finals, they lost to Millionarios 3–1 on penalty kicks after tying on aggregate 2–2.

== Facilities ==
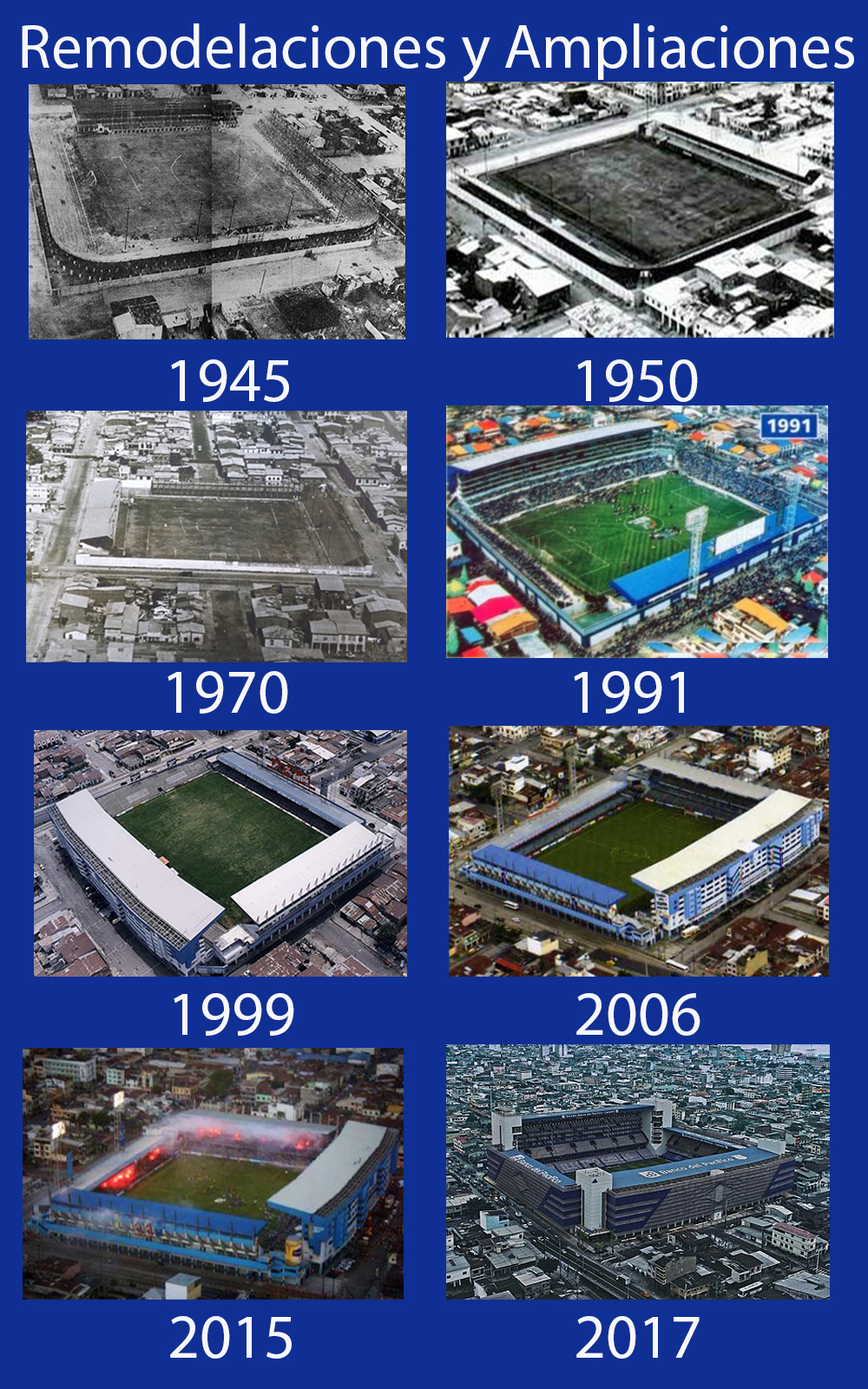
Expansions and renovations to Capwell Stadium over the years. The stadium was originally built to host baseball games, thanks to its founder's passion for the sport.

Several years after the creation of the Empresa Eléctrica del Ecuador sports club, its founder, George Lewis Capwell, decided that it was time for the club to have its own Baseball stadium, so in 1942 Guayaquil's Municipal authorities donated 4 city blocks for the construction of the first private sports stadium in Ecuador. A year after that, in 1943, Emelec's staff officially named and initiated the construction of the George Capwell Stadium.

George Capwell Stadium opened its doors for the first time on 21 October 1945, the inaugural game was a Baseball match between Emelec and Oriente, and George Capwell played as a catcher for the "Azules" (Emelec). Although Emelec's president did not like football and their stadium was not initially intended to be a football field, soon after the inauguration the first football match was held. Emelec won 5–4 against an all stars team from the cities of Manta and Bahia.

The 1947 Copa America competition was held exclusively at George Capwell Stadium, and an undefeated Argentina became South America's champion with an all star team that included names like Alfredo Di Stéfano, Félix Loustau, and Norberto Doroteo Méndez. Ecuador finished in 6th place. (Brazil did not participate on this competition).

After the Estadio Modelo was opened in 1959, the George Capwell Stadium became obsolete and was closed for many years. On several occasions it was almost destroyed for various projects that, luckily for the club, were never actually completed.

It wasn't until 1991 that with the leadership of Nassib Nehme that the George Capwell Stadium was reopened, to become once again the house of Emelec. Since its reopening the stadium has been enlarged twice and a new and final change was scheduled for 2014, to reach a final capacity of 45,000 spectators by March 2016.

At the moment the official capacity of the stadium according to the FEF (Federación Ecuatoriana de Fútbol) is 18,000 spectators. However, that number has not been changed even after the two enlargements were finished. The club completed a thorough overhaul and expansion of the stadium in 2017. It has a capacity of 40,000 spectators.

=== Training ground ===
Emelec's training ground is located in the north of Guayaquil in a neighborhood called Los Samanes and the training ground itself is called Complejo Deportivo de Los Samanes, translated to Los Samanes Sports Complex. The construction of the Samanes training ground started in 1984 and was finished in 1986 and was built by Filanbanco a large financial institution in Ecuador at the time.

Filanbanco had its own professional football which used Los Samanes until 1989 when despite being one of the top teams at the time, Filanbanco's football club was disbanded due to lack of supporters and high maintenance costs.

During the 1993 Copa America held in Ecuador, the Samanes complex was used by the Argentinean delegation. They stayed and trained there and were appreciative of its secluded nature, and facilities that included 4 professional football fields, an indoor football field, basketball and tennis courts, and an Olympic-size pool.

After Filanbanco's football club was disbanded, the complex remained in the hands of Filanbanco for their employees to use its facilities, until 1999 when the Ecuadorian financial crisis ended with Filanbanco going bankrupt and ending up in the hands of the AGD a governmental agency created to control, protect and administer the assets of Filanbanco and other financial institutions that went bust during the crisis.

This meant that Los Samanes ended up in the hands of the Issfa (Instituto de Servicio Social de las Fuerzas Armadas) the Ecuadorian army's social security agency. Because Issfa had no real use for it, the then Football director of Emelec Mr. Omar Quintana Baquerizo managed to loan the training ground for the club and Emelec has been using it ever since.

Initially the agreement was a loan for 5 years, but when the 5 years passed the government and the club arranged a 100-year loan for the facilities, however the high monthly cost agreed has made the payments very difficult for the club and the new administrators led by the club's president Mr. Elias Wated are in talks with the government to settle on a definitive purchase of the training ground.

== Honours ==
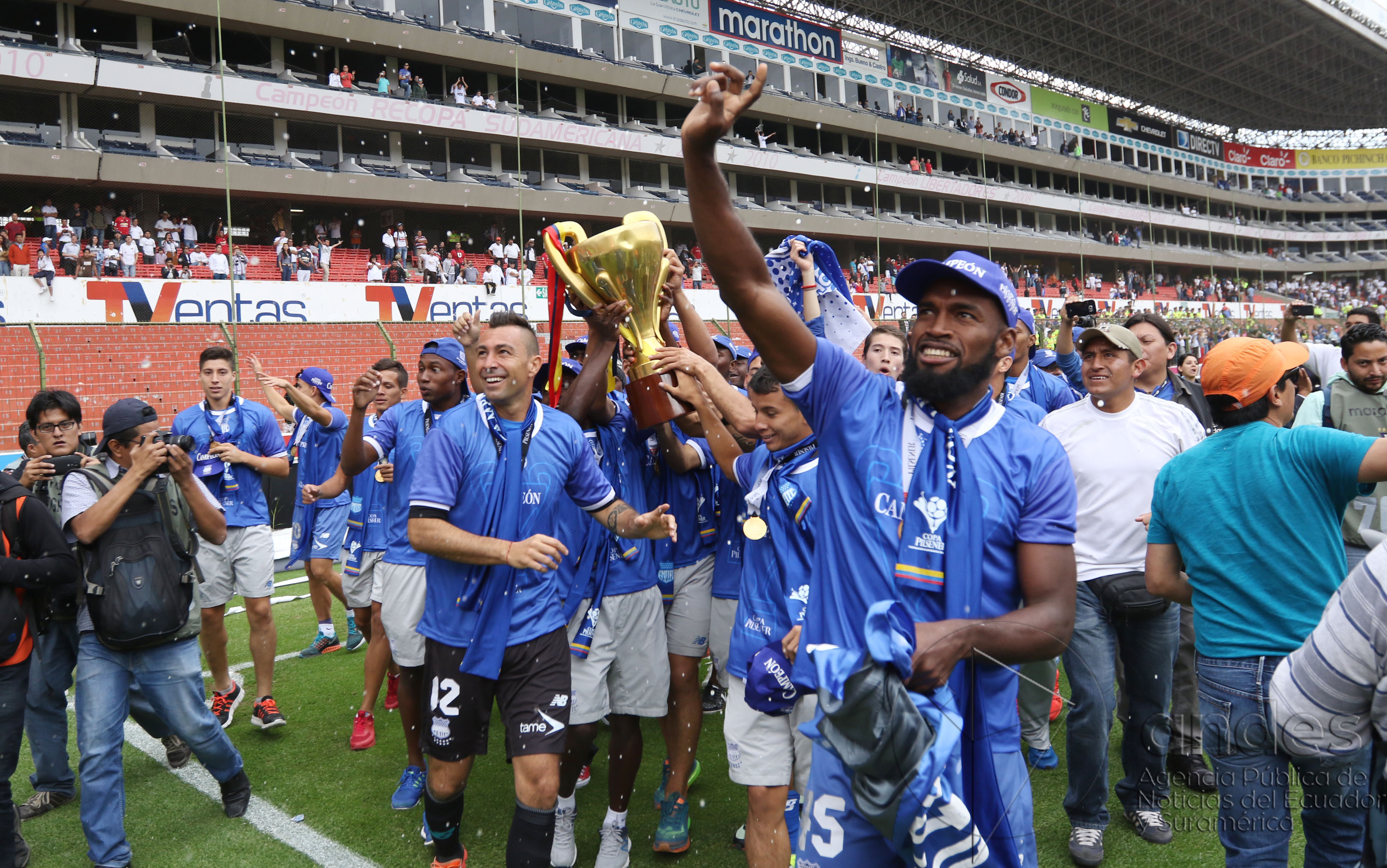
Emelec achieved a historic three-time championship in Quito in the 2015 season.

=== National ===
- Serie A
  - Winners (14): 1957, 1961, 1965, 1972, 1979, 1988, 1993, 1994, 2001, 2002, 2013, 2014, 2015, 2017
- Serie B
  - Winners (1): 1981 E1

=== Regional ===
- Campeonato Amateur de Guayaquil
  - Winners (2): 1946, 1948
- Campeonato Profesional de Fútbol del Guayas
  - Winners (5): 1956, 1957, 1962, 1964, 1966

== Players ==
=== Current squad ===
As of 16 November, 2026

Note: Flags indicate national team as defined under FIFA eligibility rules; some limited exceptions apply. Players may hold more than one non-FIFA nationality.

No.	Pos.	Nation	Player
1	GK	ECU	Mario Valero
2	DF	ARG	Aníbal Leguizamón
4	DF	ECU	Estalin Segura
5	MF	ECU	Ángelo Mina
6	MF	PAN	Víctor Griffith (on loan from St Johnstone)
7	FW	ARG	Luca Klimowicz (on loan from Instituto)
8	MF	URU	Gonzalo Nápoli (on loan from León)
9	FW	ECU	Ronie Carrillo
15	FW	ECU	Luis Fragozo
16	MF	ECU	Sergio Quintero

No.	Pos.	Nation	Player
18	DF	ECU	Mathías Carabalí
19	MF	ECU	Milton Cagua
25	FW	ECU	Josué Palma
27	DF	ECU	Fernando León (captain)
51	DF	ECU	Stalin Valencia
55	MF	ECU	José Cevallos
70	FW	ECU	Andrés Lara
79	DF	ECU	Jean Quiñónez
90	GK	ECU	Eduardo Bores (on loan from Independiente del Valle)

=== Out on loan ===
Note: Flags indicate national team as defined under FIFA eligibility rules; some limited exceptions apply. Players may hold more than one non-FIFA nationality.

No.	Pos.	Nation	Player
24	DF	ECU	José Hernández (at Gualaceo)
28	FW	URU	José Neris (at Defensor Sporting)

No.	Pos.	Nation	Player
31	MF	ECU	Dixon Vera (at Técnico Universitario)
34	MF	ECU	Edgar Lastre (at Técnico Universitario)

=== Reserve Team ===
Note: Flags indicate national team as defined under FIFA eligibility rules; some limited exceptions apply. Players may hold more than one non-FIFA nationality.

No.	Pos.	Nation	Player
—	DF	ECU	Luis Castillo

=== Top goalscorers ===
Emelec has had nine players become the season top-scorer in the Serie A, three players become the top-scorer of the Costa champion (two players repeated), and one player become the top-scorer of the Copa Libertadores.

Seria A

- (Ecuador) Carlos Alberto Raffo (1963; 4 goals)
- (Argentina) Carlos Miori (1979; 26 goals)
- (Ecuador) Ariel Graziani (1996; 19 goals)
- (Ecuador) Ariel Graziani (1997; 24 goals)
- (Ecuador) Iván Kaviedes (1998; 43 goals)
- (Argentina) Alejandro Kenig (2000; 25 goals)
- (Ecuador) Carlos Juárez (2001; 17 goals)
- (Argentina) Luis Miguel Escalada (2006; 29 goals)
- (Ecuador) Jaime Ayoví (2010; 23 goals)
- (Ecuador) Miler Bolaños (2015; 25 goals)

Costa

- (Ecuador) Carlos Alberto Raffo (1956; 13 goals)
- (Ecuador) Carlos Alberto Raffo (1957; 14 goals)
- (Ecuador) Carlos Alberto Raffo (1959; 21 goals)
- (Ecuador) Carlos Alberto Raffo (1960; 11 goals)
- (Ecuador) Carlos Alberto Raffo (1961; 14 goals)
- (Uruguay) Ruben Baldi (1964; 11 goals)
- (Ecuador) Bolívar Merizalde (1964; 11 goals)
- (Ecuador) Bolívar Merizalde (1965; 7 goals)

Copa Libertadores

- (Ecuador) Enrique Rayondi (1962; 6 goals)

=== World Cup players ===
The following players were chosen to represent their country at the FIFA World Cup while contracted to Emelec.

- (Ecuador) Walter Ayoví (2002)
- (Ecuador) Augusto Jesús Poroso (2002)
- (Ecuador) Wellington Sánchez (2002)
- (Ecuador) Daniel Viteri (2002)
- (Ecuador) Gabriel Achilier (2014)
- (Ecuador) Óscar Bagüí (2014)
- (Ecuador) Jorge Guagua (2014)

== Managers ==
=== Current coaching staff ===
- Manager: Ismael Rescalvo
- Assistant manager: Juan Rescalvo
- Physical trainer: Jose Barrientos
- Keeper Trainer: Agustín Segura

=== Notable managers ===
The following managers won at least one trophy when in charge of Emelec:

- (Argentina) Eduardo Spandre (won the 1957 Serie A)
- (Argentina) Mariano Larraz (won the 1961 Serie A)
- (Argentina) Fernando Paternoster (won the 1965 Serie A)
- (Ecuador) Jorge Lazo (won the 1972 Serie A)
- (Ecuador) Eduardo García (won the 1979 Serie A)
- (Uruguay) Juan Silva (won the 1988 Serie A)
- (Argentina) Salvador Capitano (won the 1993 Serie A)
- (Ecuador) Carlos Torres Garcés (won the 1994 Serie A)
- (Ecuador) Carlos Sevilla (won the 2001 Serie A)
- (Argentina) Rodolfo Motta (won the 2002 Serie A)
- (Bolivia) Gustavo Quinteros (won the 2013 and 2014 Serie A)
- (Argentina) Omar De Felipe (won the 2015 Serie A)
- (Uruguay) Alfredo Arias (won the 2017 Serie A)

== Other sports ==
Emelec is not only one of the most important football clubs in Ecuador, but it is rated as one of the most important sports club of the country. In their trophy room Emelec has hundreds of cups and medals that have been gained over the years in many different sports. The list includes:

- 33 Consecutive National Boxing Championships
- 13 Baseball National Championships
- 11 Male Basketball National Championships
- 18 Female Basketball National Championships
- 7 Cycling National Championships
- 5 Tae Kwon Do National Championships
- 5 Judo National Championships
- 1 Weight Lifting World Championship
