= Nathaly López Borja =

Ecuadorian engineer (1987–2023)

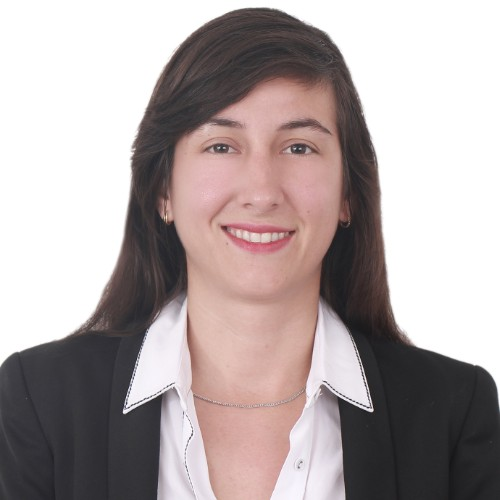
- López Borja in 2022

Director of the Teodoro Maldonado Carbo Specialties Hospital
- In office 2022–2023

Personal details
- Born: Nathaly Cristina López Borja; 23 November 1987 Guayaquil, Ecuador
- Died: 28 March 2023 (aged 35) Guayaquil, Ecuador
- Cause of death: Assassination
- Education: Universidad de Especialidades Espíritu Santo
- Occupation: Academic staff, Activist
- Known for: Fight against corruption

Nathaly Cristina López Borja (Guayaquil, 23 November 1987 – Guayaquil, 28 March 2023) was an Ecuadorian commerce and finance engineer, activist, and university professor, with extensive experience in public service within the administrative field in the country's hospitals. She stood out for her commitment in the fight against corruption.

== Early life and education ==
Nathaly Cristina López Borja was born on 23 November 1987, in the Ecuadorian city of Guayaquil.

She completed her primary and secondary education at the German School of Guayaquil (1993–2005), where she graduated with a degree in Commercial Informatics.

After studying at the Catholic University of Santiago de Guayaquil (2007–2012), she obtained a degree in International Commerce and Finance Engineering. She earned a master's degree in education from the Monterrey Institute of Technology (2015–2017), and another one in Business Administration (2019–2020) from the University of Espíritu Santo (UEES). She was pursuing a Ph.D. in Administration and Organizational Management at UEES, which she began in 2021.

In addition to her professional practice, she also volunteered at the Humboldt German School of Guayaquil and was actively involved in the Animal Rescue Foundation of Ecuador.

== Career ==
Between 2015 and 2017, she worked as an administrative analyst at the Ecuadorian Institute of Social Security. She served as a university professor in strategic administration at the University of Espíritu Santo.

On 25 October 2022, she was appointed director of the Teodoro Maldonado Carbo Specialties Hospital, with responsibilities including overall administrative coordination. She supervised various areas, including public procurement. She was also in charge of general financial coordination and general human resources coordination.

López implemented changes in the procurement processes and, together with the hospital's administrative team, monitored and even blocked instances of corruption. She held press conferences and visited media outlets to explain the ongoing work and her aim to make procurement transparent and provide better service to affiliates and retirees. With documents in hand, she referred to progress in the provision of medication and projects to continue in that direction. Nathaly López identified corruption instances from previous administrations in administrative, financial, human resources, maintenance, public procurement, and even in the morgue, where there had been cases of corpse trafficking in the past. She also coordinated with medical heads to initiate procurement processes for medicines and supplies to avoid shortages in the pharmacy.

== Assassination ==
On the night of 28 March 2023, as she was leaving her work shift at 8:30 PM, López was driving her vehicle towards her home when she was ambushed by two hitmen at the intersection of the elevated viaduct of Pío Jaramillo Avenue. The attack took place while hospital executives were promoting a procedure to make public procurement processes transparent.

== Repercussions ==
Following the attack on Nathaly López, several officials holding managerial positions at the Teodoro Maldonado Carbo Specialties Hospital tendered their resignations between the night of Tuesday, 28 March, and the morning of Wednesday, 29 March, after receiving threats such as "If you don't resign tomorrow, you'll die too." Less than 12 hours after the crime, there was a massive resignation of officials, with reports of death threats targeting chiefs and coordinators working at the hospital. Around twenty resignations were submitted through the Quipux system, the Ecuadorian government's platform, and nine of them were officially accepted the following morning. Doctors at the hospital reported that several employees received threats. Fear and concern persist. A week before López's murder, photos of threats were circulating in the elevators. Workers are afraid to report it, suspecting that some of their own colleagues are leaking information. The IESS categorically condemned violence against HTMC personnel and urged authorities to investigate these incidents and hold those responsible accountable.

Her death caused great shock within the hospital community. She was described as a brilliant professional with many virtues who wanted to transform a hospital. The following morning, the media reported the bitter disappointment that someone fighting against corruption had become a victim of violence.

The society cannot be indifferent to these events; the authorities must clarify the incidents, and the law must punish them. Only then will this death not be just another one, and the young people who dare to work for an honest country will not give up.

The President of the Republic, Guillermo Lasso, expressed his solidarity with Nathaly López's family, lamenting the crime against the official. On his part, the Vice President of the Republic, Alfredo Borrero, stated that the crime brings mourning to the country, but above all to the healthcare system where she 'contributed with professionalism and human quality.' Violence and corruption cannot take away more innocent lives. The responsible individuals for this crime must be held accountable before justice and society," added Borrero. Former Vice President Otto Sonnenholzner rejected the crime during an interview on Ecuavisa. "She was an honorable young woman. She has died defending the interests of Ecuadorians, refusing to yield to the criminal mafias of that hospital, which, to this day, manage to elude justice."

The Office of the Attorney General opened an investigation into the murder of Nathaly López, director of the Teodoro Maldonado Hospital of the IESS. The National Police of Ecuador reported that specialized units have been deployed to apprehend those responsible for this crime. "We will not allow this incident to go unpunished." The incident reaffirms the levels of violence and insecurity that the Andean country is currently facing in 2023. Following the attack on López, officials from three hospitals are under protection due to organized crime attacks. The hospitals of the IESS are under police intelligence intervention after Nathaly López's murder. The objective is to detect the mafias operating within Ecuador's healthcare system, which would be involved in the crime, as well as other attacks against healthcare workers.

== Tributes ==
The North External Consultation building of Teodoro Maldonado Carbo Hospital has been dedicated in honor of Nathaly López Borja, who held the position of administrative director of the hospital.
