= Estadio George Capwell =

Multi-purpose stadium in Guayaquil, Ecuador

Coordinates: 02°12′24″S 79°53′38″W

Estadio Banco del Pacífico Capwell
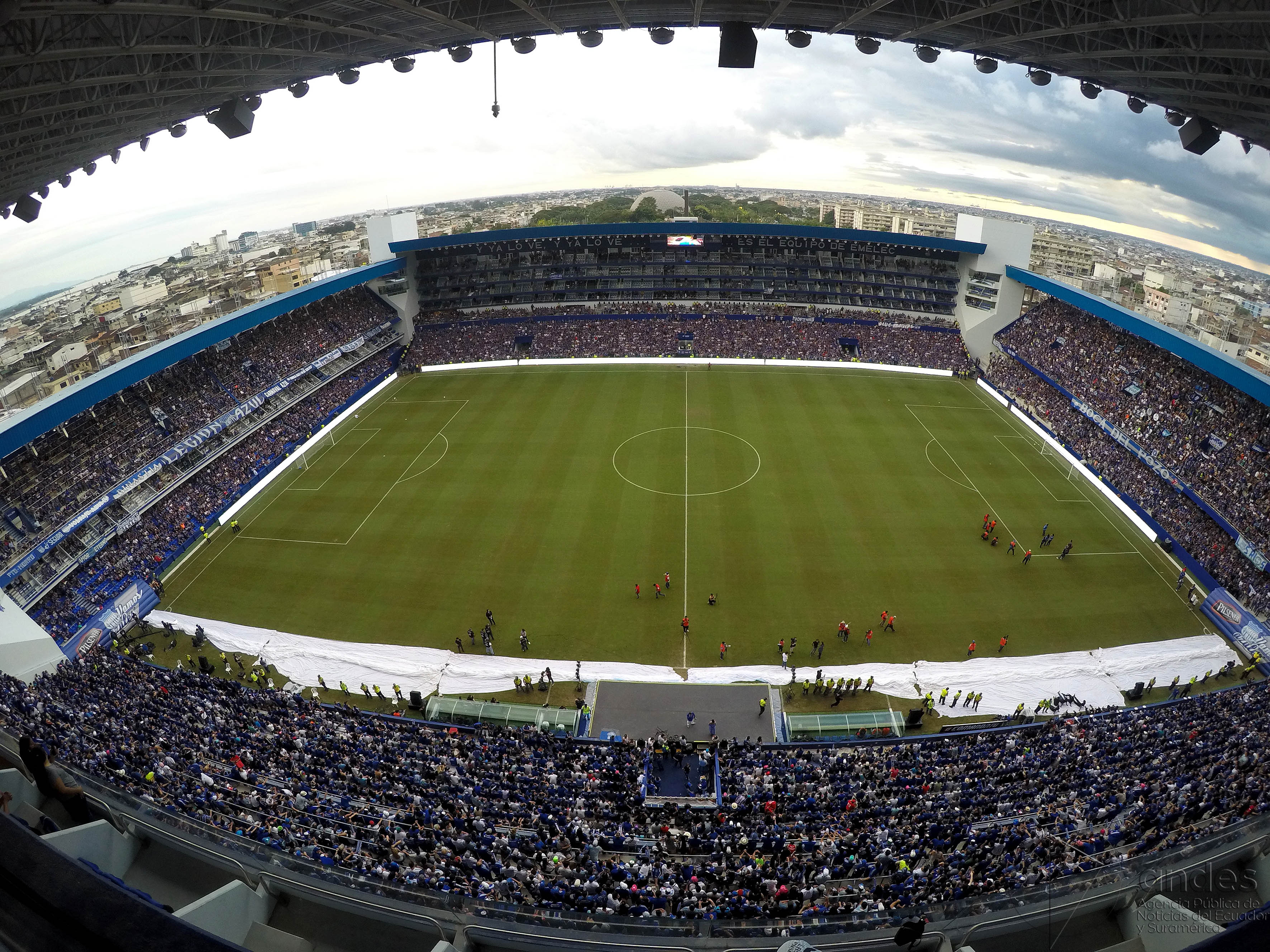
- George L. Capwell Stadium
- Interactive map of Estadio Banco del Pacífico Capwell
- Full name: Estadio George L. Capwell
- Location: Guayaquil, Ecuador
- Owner: Emelec
- Operator: Emelec
- Capacity: 40,020
- Surface: Grass
- Field size: 105 m × 68 m (344 ft × 223 ft)

Construction
- Built: 1943
- Opened: October 21, 1945
- Renovated: 1991, 1999, 2006, 2017

Tenant
- Club Sport Emelec

Estadio Banco del Pacífico Capwell is a multi-purpose stadium in Guayaquil, Ecuador. It is currently used mostly for football matches and is the home stadium of Emelec. It was announced right after Emelec won the 2013 Ecuador Serie A title that Estadio George Capwell would be completely remodeled to hold a capacity of 40,000 fans. The remodeling work began in June 2014 and ended in December 2016.

In their first league season (Primera Etapa 2017) season at the expanded stadium, Emelec drew an average home attendance of 22,407. It became the highest average in the league, followed by Barcelona SC with 10,572.

== Overview ==
Founder George Lewis Capwell was born in the United States; he travelled to Ecuador to supervise his electric company Empresa Eléctrica del Ecuador, translated into English as the Ecuadorian Electric Company. While supervising the company, Capwell saw that his workers were interested in soccer, therefore, he decided to create a soccer team that bears the company's name, C.S. Emelec.

Capwell's colleagues founded the football club on 28 April 1929. Emelec was registered to the Serie C, or C league, in Ecuador in 1929. In 1940 a stadium was built to honour him.

== The stadium and its beginnings ==
Estadio George Capwell is located north of General Gomez Street, south of San Martin, west of Quito Avenue, and east of Montufar Street. It was named after George Capwell not just to honour the football club's founder and first president, but also because he led the construction of the stadium. Capwell's initial idea was for the site not to be a football field, but a baseball diamond. When football's popularity grew in the company and in Guayaquil, the baseball field was quickly converted into a soccer stadium, which it remains to this day.

=== Construction ===
Construction of the stadium started in September 1940, when the council of Guayaquil approved the leasing of four square blocks for the construction of Emelec's new stadium. On September 8, 1942, the municipality donated the blocks instead of having them leased. On 15 October 1942, the Ecuadorian Republic approved the city blocks for the stadium's construction.

On 24 June 1943, the first stone was placed. The construction was completed, and Estadio George Capwell was inaugurated with a baseball game between Emelec and Oriente, on 21 October 1945, with 11,000 fans in attendance. The doors opened to football on 2 December 1945; a match was held between Emelec and Manta-Bahia, which Emelec won 5-4.

The Ecuadorian local tournament was won by Emelec who won their local title for the first time. A year later, on 30 November 1947, the stadium welcomed international football when Guayaquil hosted the Copa America tournament; Estadio Capwell was the stadium host. Once El Estadio Modelo opened its doors in 1959, Estadio Capwell lost its prestige and began to slowly fall into disrepair.
