= Eduardo García (footballer, born 1945) =

Uruguayan-born Ecuadorian footballer (1945-2016)

Personal information
- Full name: Eduardo García Vergara
- Date of birth: 8 March 1945
- Place of birth: Colonia, Uruguay
- Date of death: 26 February 2016 (aged 70)
- Position: Goalkeeper

Senior career*
Years	Team	Apps	(Gls)
1962–1967	Peñarol		
1968–1969	Emelec		
1970	Nacional		
1971	Bella Vista		
1972–1979	Emelec		

International career
1971	Uruguay	1	(0)
1976–1977	Ecuador	3	(0)
- * Club domestic league appearances and goals

Eduardo García Vergara (8 March 1945 – 26 February 2016) was a footballer who played international football for both Uruguay and Ecuador.

He played club football in those two countries for Peñarol, Emelec, Nacional and Bella Vista.

He later became a coach at Emelec, and also ran a food business. He died on 26 February 2016.
