= Esperanza Galván =

Ecuadorian politician

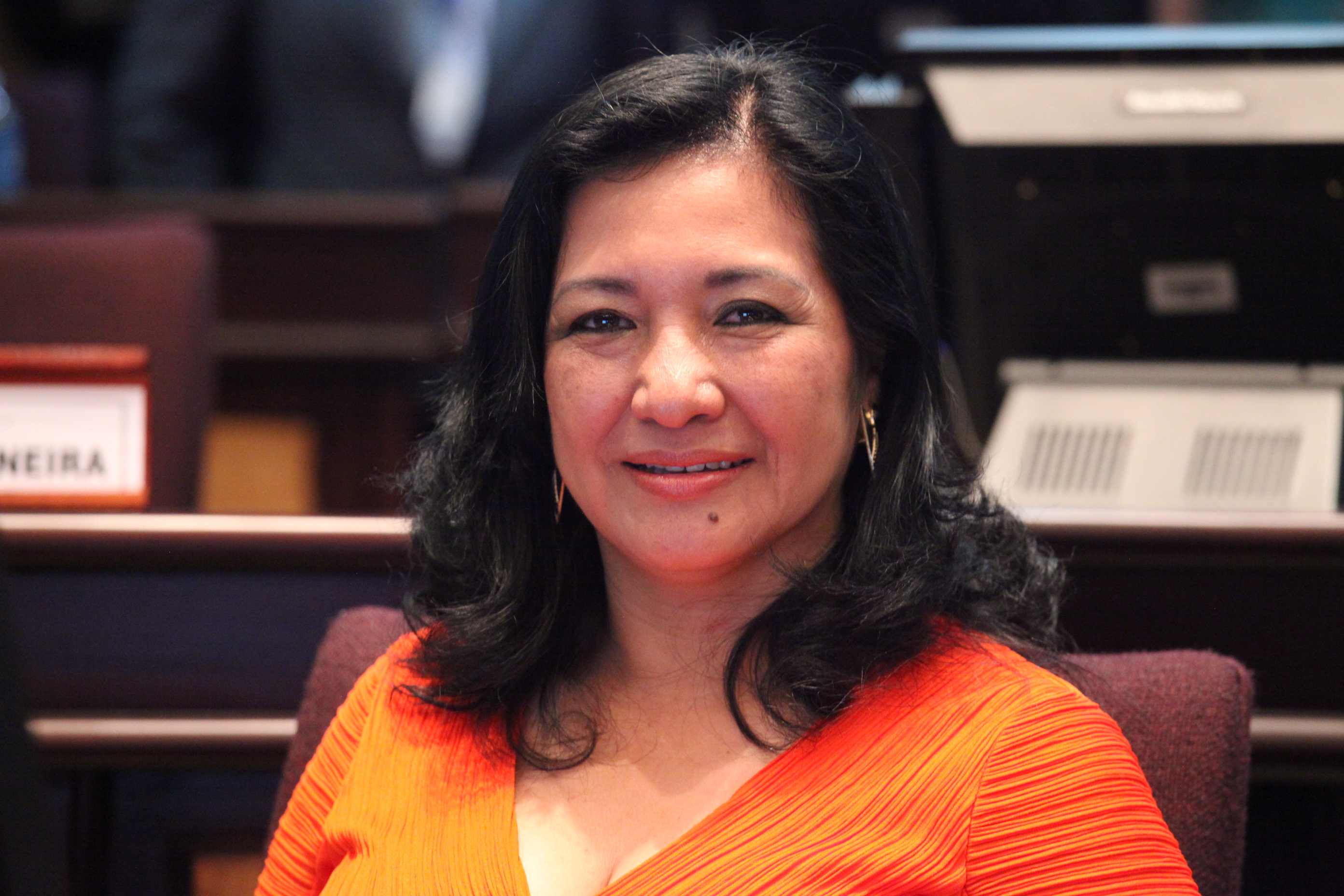
- Occupation: Politician
- Known for: in 2015 she went to jail
- Political party: Alianza PAIS

Esperanza Galván is an Ecuadorian politician who was elected to Ecuador's National Assembly in 2013. In 2015 she went to jail after being found guilty of bribery.

== Life ==
Galván was elected as an assemblywoman for the province of Esmeraldas in the 2013 legislative elections for Alianza PAIS. Her party won a lot of the votes and before the ballot had been completely counted her election and that of her colleagues Lenin Lara Rivadeneira and Gabriel Rivera López was certain.

During her time as a legislator, she was part of the Economic Development Commission of the National Assembly.

She was one of the seven assembly members to vote against the Law for the Creation of the La Concordia Canton (which was approved by 110 votes against 7), considering that the canton should belong to the province of Esmeraldas and not to the province of Santo Domingo of the Tsachilas.

== Arrest ==
On May 24, 2015, President Rafael Correa announced, during his report to the nation, that a corruption complaint was being noted against a member of the ruling movement. The Attorney General of the State, Galo Chiriboga, revealed that the defendant was Esperanza Galván, and she was arrested the same day, as she left the National Assembly.

The complaint revealed that Galván had received $800,000 to make a contract viable for the Esmeraldas Potable Water company. In addition to Galván, two more were arrested, including the former manager of the Esmeraldas Potable Water company, who also belonged to the ruling movement. The next day the Alianza PAIS Ethics Commission expelled Galván from the party.

On November 24, 2015, Esperanza Galván was found guilty of bribery and sentenced by the National Court of Justice to three years in prison.
