= Bolívar Merizalde =

Ecuadorian footballer (born 1941)

Personal information
- Full name: Armando Bolívar Merizalde Cali
- Date of birth: 26 November 1941 (age 84)

International career
Years	Team	Apps	(Gls)
1963–1967	Ecuador	2	(0)

Bolívar Merizalde (born 26 November 1941) is an Ecuadorian footballer. He played in two matches for the Ecuador national football team from 1963 to 1967. He was also part of Ecuador's squad for the 1963 South American Championship.
