= Purga Case =

Purge Case
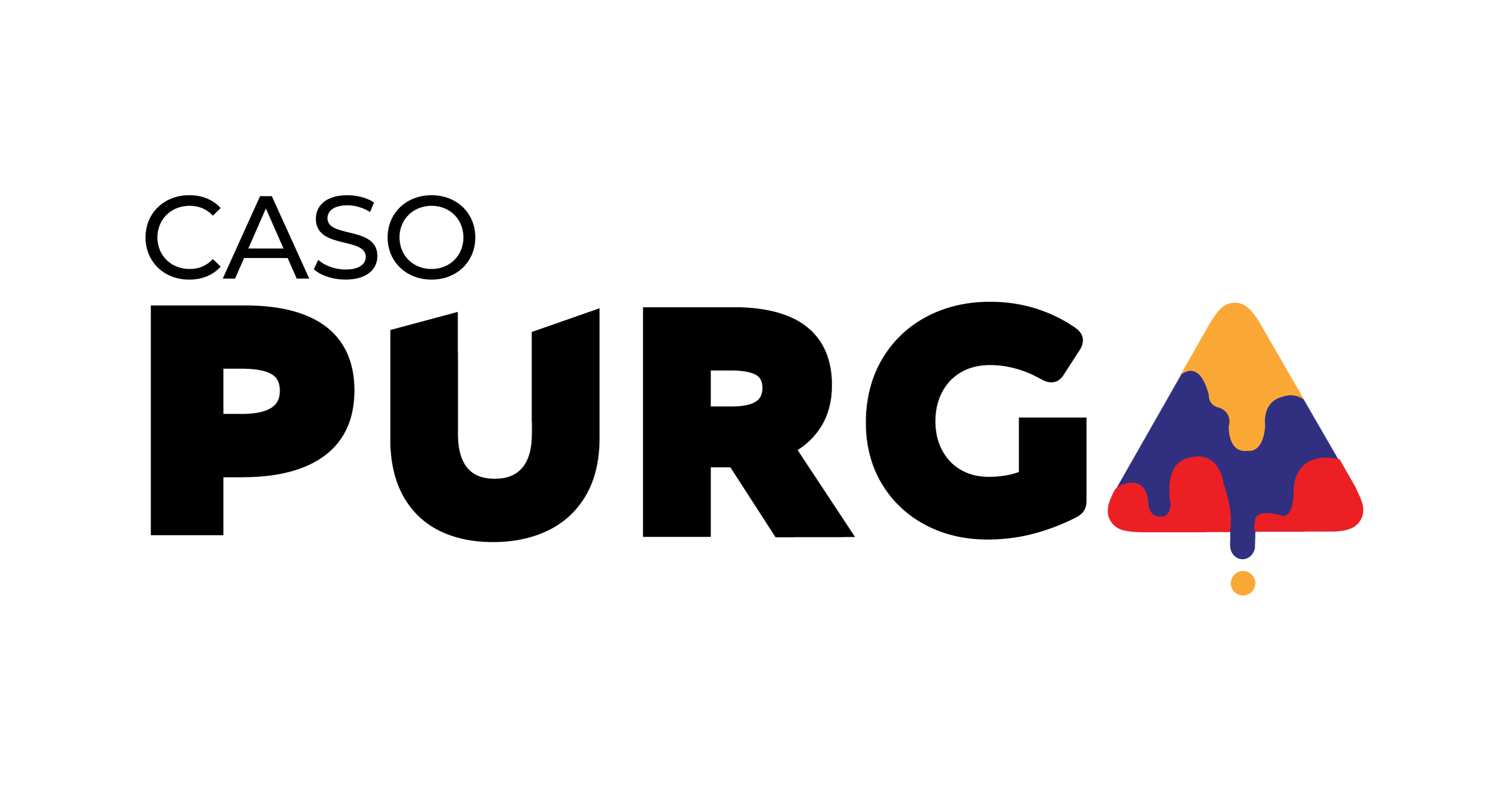
- Full case name: Attorney General of Ecuador v. Narcopolitics
- Started: March 4, 2024
- Charge: Organized crime

Court membership
- Judge sitting: Javier de la Cadena (Preliminary Hearing)

The Purga Case is the media term for a criminal judicial process in Ecuador in which the Attorney General's Office has pressed charges against several public officials and justice operators, seeking to prove the connections between politics, justice, and drug trafficking.

"The Purga Case is a demonstration of how corruption was generated from the highest spheres of legislative politics, which put at its service and, obviously, at the service of drug trafficking, the administration of justice in one of the most influential provinces of the country, Guayas, through which criminal economies had found a very profitable operating vehicle for impunity to flourish," stated Diana Salazar, who served as the Attorney General of Ecuador until May 20, 2024.

The investigative phase covered a period of 90 days in the criminal process related to organized crime within the Purga case, which began on March 5, 2024. During this stage, preventive detention orders were issued for eight of those involved, three were subject to periodic presentation measures with a prohibition on leaving the country. Additionally, one person was placed under house arrest. The Purga case was initiated with a fiscal file consisting of 490 volumes.

On March 3, 2025, the National Court of Justice rendered its verdict in the Purga case, sentencing ten individuals for criminal conspiracy. Former national assemblyman Pablo Muentes received a 13-year sentence, alongside five judges from the Provincial Court of Guayas who were convicted of their role in the scheme. Acting Attorney General Wilson Toainga stated in his closing remarks: "It is time for all state officials to understand that acts of public corruption destroy the constitutional state and violate the rights of all Ecuadorians." The verdicts marked the conclusion of the judicial phase and represented a significant outcome in Ecuador's anti-corruption efforts under the prosecutorial direction that had characterized the investigative stage.

== Background ==
On March 4, 2024, the National Court of Justice was the scene of a pivotal arraignment hearing related to the Purga case, involving 12 individuals accused of organized crime. Leading this session was Judge Javier de la Cadena of the National Court of Justice, who, in his crucial role, assessed the prosecution's request to determine appropriate precautionary measures for the defendants. The case took an unexpected turn when, after an extensive and thorough hearing that extended from 9:00 p.m. on March 4 until the early hours of the following day, the magistrate decided to impose preventive detention for 11 of the 12 accused, while one of them, due to advanced age, was granted the alternative of house arrest. In the 43 raids conducted within the Purga case, the Prosecutor's Office seized cell phones, laptops, information storage devices, liquor, jewelry, and cash. The operations took place in the provinces of Guayas and Pichincha.

Among the names that resonated in the National Court of Justice chamber during that day were prominent figures such as former Social Christian Assembly member Pablo Muentes and the former president of the Provincial Court of Justice of Guayas, Fabiola Gallardo. Both were implicated as part of the alleged organized crime scheme. This significant judicial process was characterized by its complexity and the seriousness of the charges, generating significant interest both in the public opinion and in the political and judicial circles of the country.

The hearing, which extended into the early hours of the morning, was suspended and resumed later, demonstrating the complexity and detailed analysis that Judge De la Cadena applied in evaluating each case. The determination of precautionary measures not only impacted the lives of the defendants but also sparked debates and discussions regarding the application of justice in cases of this magnitude, thus marking a relevant chapter in the judicial history of the country.

== Involved in the corruption scheme ==
The Purga Case reveals a corruption scheme involving figures from the legal sphere. This report unravels the connections and activities pointing towards a corruption network that has permeated different levels of the judicial system.

1. María Fabiola Gallardo Ramia (Former President of the Provincial Court of Justice of Guayas). Arrested for alleged organized crime. Gallardo ruled in favor of the protection action filed by the Army Engineering Corps against the Public Works Company of Quito, for a $30 million contract, in exchange for the remodeling of the court's presidency floor.
2. Johan Gustavo Marfetán Medina (Judge of the Provincial Court of Justice of Guayas). Leader of a criminal organization, manipulated justice through habeas data. Investigated for allegedly receiving bribes totaling $140,000 to issue favorable rulings for the mother and brother of drug trafficker Leandro Norero.
3. Pablo Bolívar Muentes Alarcón (Former Assembly Member of the Social Christian Party). Controlled the administration of justice in Guayas and directed this organized crime network. Allegedly financed the campaign and operation of Fabiola Gallardo, former President of the Provincial Court of Justice of Guayas. He would have used his proximity to Gallardo to benefit from a judicial ruling that allowed him and his wife to obtain a compensation of USD 3.9 million from Banco del Pacífico. He would have used falsified and adulterated receipts.
4. Mónica Alvarado Vargas (Wife of Pablo Muentes). Allegedly benefited from judicial rulings obtained by her partner to validate false and altered payment receipts, justifying a $314,000 debt to the Banco del Pacífico.
5. Reinaldo Efraín Cevallos Cercado (Judge of the Criminal Court of the Provincial Court of Justice of Guayas). Ordered Banco del Pacífico to pay $3.9 million to Pablo Muentes in a habeas data recourse. In 2014, he was investigated for the discovery of high-caliber weapons in his residence, prompting a disciplinary process. In 2021, he led the investigation into the murder of presenter Efraín Ruales, calling seven people to trial for the crime.
6. Hugo Manuel González Alarcón (Current President of the Provincial Court of Justice of Guayas). Allegedly collaborated with Mayra Salazar in the "campaign" for the court presidency, focusing on the proposal of the "habeas data".In 2014, he was investigated for the discovery of high-caliber weapons in his residence, prompting a disciplinary process. In 2021, he led the investigation into the murder of presenter Efraín Ruales, calling seven people to trial for the crime.
7. Mercedes Leonor Villarreal Vera (Provincial Director of the Judiciary Council of Guayas). Allegedly collaborated in filing administrative proceedings against Gallardo and participated in the introduction of the "electronic stamp" in the election of Hugo González.
8. Ruth Catalina Solano Padilla (Legal Prosecutor of the Army Engineering Corps). Transferred $1,400 to Marya Salazar for the remodeling of the Court Presidency floor.
9. Fausto Alfonso Mero Zambrano (Advisor to Mercedes Leonor Villarreal). Allegedly participated in filing administrative proceedings against Gallardo.
10. Mayra Salazar Merchán (Communicator, with extensive power in Guayas justice). Allegedly managed "troll" accounts used in favor of Pablo Muentes' requests. In a chat with Daniel Salcedo, prosecuted in the Metastasis case, he is asked to spread a video about the murder of Fernando Villavicencio, in which alleged members of Los Lobos deny connections to the crime.
11. Nelson Mecías Ponce Murillo (Judge of the Specialized Court for Family, Women, Children, and Adolescent Offenders).
12. Ramos Alberto Lino Tumbaco (Judge of the Provincial Court of Justice of Guayas). He voted in favor of ratifying the innocence of Abdalá and Michell Bucaram Puley, and Gabriela Pazmiño in the case of hospital corruption. He processed the appeal of those sentenced for the murder of Efrain Ruales, then excused himself from further proceedings.
13. Pedro Guillermo Valarezo Coello (Judge of the Provincial Court of Justice of Guayas). He was a member of the criminal court that revoked habeas corpus in favor of drug trafficker Junior Roldán (former leader of the Choneros). He was part of the court that ruled in favor of the Army Corps of Engineers in its legal dispute against the EPMOP, which resulted in the renovation of the floor of Gallardo's office
14. Henry Robert Taylor Terán (Judge of the Provincial Court of Justice of Guayas). He was a member of the court that favored the Army Corps of Engineers in its case against the EPMOP, for which Gallardo received the remodeling of his office floor
15. Pedro Moreira (Former Penitentiary Guarantees Judge for prevarication), for granting house arrest to Junior Roldán, leader of Los Choneros.
16. Andersson Boscán (Journalist). Appears in the chats of drug trafficker Leandro Norero.
17. Claudia Garzón (Former Commissioner for Prison Pacification during the government of Guillermo Lasso).
18. Yanina Villagómez (Provincial Prosecutor of Guayas).Villagómez linked to the Metastasis case must answer for her apparent closeness to Xavier Novillo, alias Novi, one of the lawyers of drug trafficker Leandro Norero. She was called to give her version in the Purge case.
19. Elcy Rumania Celi Loaiza (Former Vocal of the Judiciary). Appears in Mayra Salazar's chats.

== Preventive Detention ==
In a tension-filled judicial session, magistrate Javier de la Cadena ordered preventive detention against two prominent figures: Fabiola Gallardo, former president of the Provincial Court of Justice of Guayas, and Judge Johan Marfetán. Both face accusations of leading an organized crime network in the Purga case, according to the Prosecutor's Office. This verdict marked a milestone in the legal process that unfolded on March 5, 2024, at 8:00 a.m. However, the case also revealed a particular situation with Pablo Muentes, a former Social Christian Assembly member, who claimed depression to avoid preventive detention. Despite the presentation of medical certificates mentioning depressive disorders, anxiety, and high blood pressure, the judge dismissed these arguments, emphasizing that they did not qualify as special cases contemplated in the Penal Code.

After a recess of more than 10 hours, National Court of Justice Judge Javier de la Cadena resumed the arraignment hearing against the 12 detainees in the Purga case. The arrival of the apprehended individuals, escorted under heavy police guard, coincided with the entrance of Attorney General Diana Salazar, who was wearing a bulletproof vest. During this crucial phase, the magistrate considered the Prosecutor's request, contemplating the imposition of preventive detention for the majority of the detainees and house arrest for Judge Bernardo Cevallos, citing his advanced age, over 70 years old. This highlighted moment in the hearing reflected the complexity and meticulousness with which judicial decisions were approached.

After hearing arguments from the defense lawyers of the accused, Judge Javier de la Cadena left the courtroom to deliberate on the request for preventive detention by Prosecutor Diana Salazar. The hearing, initially scheduled to resume at 4:00 p.m., experienced a postponement and finally resumed at 6:00 p.m. This prolonged episode underscored the importance and sensitivity of the judicial process, keeping the public opinion on edge and generating expectations regarding the judicial decisions that would determine the fate of those involved in the Purga case.

In response to the emergency at the Guayas Court, in a press conference on March 8, 2024, Álvaro Román, President of the Judiciary Council, Solanda Goyes, Vocal of the Judiciary Council, and Ana María Ayala, Provincial Director of Guayas, explained that new judges would be appointed to the Criminal Court. The salaries of the 7 judges apprehended in the Purga case have been retained, and the salary amounts of these seven magistrates will be maintained until there is a resolution.

== The Network of Judicial Intrigues ==
=== Elcy Celi Loaiza emerges in the Purga case as a central figure ===
Closely linked to alleged irregularities within the Ecuadorian judicial system. Her mention in conversations between Mayra Salazar and penal judge Guillermo Valarezo Coello reveals her presence at critical moments of the process. Fabiola Gallardo's request for Celi to join the discussion suggests her possible influence or involvement in the events related to the case, creating an atmosphere of tension and concern. Furthermore, Salazar's statements directly point to Celi as one of the main operators in the corruption scheme, highlighting her role as a former alternate vocal of the Judiciary Council. Her resignation just before the impeachment trial to remove titular vocal Fausto Murillo suggests a possible connection between the events and her subsequent departure, raising questions about her role in the web of influence and corruption surrounding the Purga case.

"They paid for the floor, they pay for the labor, and they harm Metropolitan with $30 million. A public entity favoring a group of organized crime within the administration of justice. And it doesn't end there, also with the participation of the former alternate vocal of the Judiciary Council (CJ) who resigned a couple of days ago. She was the operator in this case."

— Diana Salazar

According to the Attorney General's Office, Elsy Celi's involvement in the Purga case sheds light on the complexity and seriousness of the corruption allegations within the Ecuadorian judicial system. Her alleged participation as an operator within a network of influences and illicit favors reveals the depth of the systemic problems facing the administration of justice in the country. Celi's strategic resignation amid a tense political context, marked by the impeachment of Fausto Murillo, suggests a possible maneuver to avoid public exposure of her illicit activities. Her connection with other key actors, such as Mayra Salazar and penal judge Guillermo Valarezo, suggests a network of complicity pointing to a broader framework of corruption that undermines the integrity of the Ecuadorian judicial system. The revelation of her role in the Purga case poses significant challenges for the fight against corruption and the restoration of trust in the country's judicial institutions.

=== Daniel Salcedo and the Wolves Gang in the Villavicencio Case ===
On August 10, 2023, Daniel Salcedo found himself embroiled in an intriguing episode, according to the version presented by the prosecution. On that date, the accused requested Mayra Salazar, through an exchange of messages, to disseminate on social media a video attributed to the group known as "GDO Los Lobos" (Wolves Gang). In said audiovisual material, Los Lobos made statements regarding the recent murder of Fernando Villavicencio, which occurred one day prior. The prosecutor, during the hearing, shared a fragment of the audio where a voice identified as part of Los Lobos expressed rejection of the assassination of the presidential candidate, Mr. Fernando Villavicencio, and denied their involvement in violent acts against the government or civilians. Salcedo's instruction to Mayra Salazar, according to the prosecutor, was clear: "So that it goes viral... upload it to the networks." Salazar's response, recorded in the messages, revealed an ironic tone: "Hahaha Look at that, now I'm a wolf. I'll upload it right away." The prosecutor emphasized that the video was generated from Daniel Salcedo's phone and user, thus consolidating his alleged connection to this peculiar event. During the hearing, the prosecutor presented this video as a key element to support the ongoing investigation into the alleged masterminds behind the murder of Fernando Villavicencio. The version offered by the prosecution suggests that Salcedo sought wide dissemination of the video, possibly with the purpose of influencing public perception of the tragic event and diverting attention from the authorities. The use of the Wolves as a means of expression, according to the prosecution, adds an additional layer of complexity to a case that is already intriguing and raises questions about the possible motives and connections behind this violent act.

Ultimately, the information provided in the hearing by the prosecutor shed light on Daniel Salcedo's involvement in the dissemination of the video, presenting a substantial element that now forms part of the broader investigation seeking to unravel the circumstances surrounding the murder of Fernando Villavicencio.

=== Mayra Salazar and Manipulations in the Judicial System ===
Mayra Salazar, initially known for her detention in the Metastasis case and for being Leandro Norero's partner, according to the presented accusation, operated a "troll center" designed to favor Pablo Muentes by spreading commissioned messages. Additionally, she would have acquired knowledge about the system of case assignment, using this information to her own benefit. The file supporting these claims contains, among other pieces of evidence, WhatsApp conversations extracted from Mayra Salazar's phone. According to the Prosecutor, these conversations illustrate, for example, an approach between Judge Gallardo and 'Fito's lawyer, with the intention of favoring him in a case seeking to release him from 'La Roca'. Such exchanges would also reveal communications between Mayra Salazar and Daniel Salcedo, another accused in the Metastasis and hospital corruption cases. The Prosecution maintains that in these chats, Salazar informed about "arrangements in the draws of judicial cases", involving the former Judicial Council member, Xavier Muñoz, also prosecuted in the Judicial Independence case. The evidence presented by the prosecution sheds light on the complex network of influences and manipulations in which Mayra Salazar would have been involved. The ability to run a "troll center" aimed at benefiting Muentes highlights the extent of her alleged role in practices that distorted the integrity of the judicial system. The WhatsApp conversations not only reveal Salazar's alleged connections with Judge Gallardo and 'Fito's lawyer but also suggest active coordination with Daniel Salcedo in manipulating judicial draws. These elements, presented as part of the case file, fuel the suspicions of the prosecution regarding Salazar's possible complicity in corrupt judicial practices and her links to other actors involved in nationally significant cases. Ultimately, the content of the WhatsApp conversations unravels an intriguing plot where Mayra Salazar's figure emerges as a key link in the alleged manipulation of the judicial system. The specific details about the "arrangements in the draws of judicial cases," highlighted by the prosecution, add an additional dimension to the complexity of the case, emphasizing the need for meticulous analysis to fully unravel the corrupt practices that may have affected the functioning of justice. On Mayra Salazar's cell phone, conversations range from business offers for Los Lobos to how to get involved in drug trafficking. She maintains a pretrial detention order within the Metastasis case, which she serves at the Casa de Confianza de Chillogallo, located in the south of Quito.

=== Detained judges handled cases of Norero, Ruales, and Roldán ===
Among the cases led by the currently detained judges are those of Leandro Norero, Efraín Ruales, and Junior Roldán. At the epicenter of the Purge case, the courtrooms of the Court of Justice of Guayas have witnessed judicial processes of significant national importance, spanning from politicians to well-known drug traffickers. These cases, mostly overseen by the now-questioned judge Reinaldo Cevallos, have highlighted the complexity of justice in the province. Among the implicated individuals, the leader of Los Choneros, Leandro 'El Patrón' Norero, and his associates 'Fito' and 'JR', sought precautionary measures to be released from prison, as well as the former Social Christian legislator Pablo Muentes, detained for organized crime derived from the Metastasis case. Judge Johan Marfetán Medina of the Provincial Court of Justice of Guayas played a key role in the appeal of the pretrial detention of Israel Norero, brother of 'El Patrón'. His name appeared in the chats of Leandro Norero with his relatives, and in 2015, Marfetán was suspended along with two other justices for overturning a conviction in a homicide case. On another front, the case of hospital corruption involving Judge Reinaldo Cevallos Cercado, of the Criminal Chamber of the Provincial Court of Justice of Guayas, focused on the overpriced purchase of body bags and supplies at the Los Ceibos Hospital of the Social Security by Daniel Salcedo. Cevallos Cercado's office was raided in 2023 in an investigation for alleged malfeasance, and in August of the same year, the Criminal Chamber, which he was part of, ruled in favor of the drug lord Adolfo Macías, alias 'Fito', preventing his transfer to any place other than the Guayaquil Regional Prison. The Judicial Council deplored in 2014 the finding of high-caliber weapons in the residence of Judge Cevallos Cercado, items prohibited by law.

=== Pedro Moreira Accused of Prevarication ===
Pedro Moreira, former judge of penitentiary guarantees, faces accusations of prevarication by the General State Prosecutor's Office. The entity alleges that Moreira illegally granted a habeas corpus in favor of Junior Roldán, known as Junior, who was subsequently murdered in May 2023 in Colombia. In April 2022, the Judicial Council terminated Moreira's temporary appointment after granting the legal recourse in favor of the leader of Los Choneros. During the oral hearing, Moreira announced bias in granting the recourse, ordering Roldán's transfer to a healthcare facility. However, in the written ruling, he granted him house arrest. Pablo Ramírez, former director of the National Comprehensive Care Service, filed a complaint with the Guayas Judiciary for Moreira's suspension, who is among those implicated in the Purga case. This process investigates the alleged manipulation of benefits in favor of criminal groups, involving former members of the Provincial Court, judges.

=== Hugo González Linked to Corruption Network in 'Purga' Case ===
Prosecutor Diana Salazar announced the involvement of the then-president of the Provincial Court of Justice of Guayas, Hugo Manuel González Alarcón, in the "Purga" case. This scandal, which resulted in the arrest of prominent figures such as former assemblyman Pablo Muentes and seven judges, including former president Fabiola Gallardo Ramia, uncovered a corruption network aimed at manipulating the administration of justice in the province. González, who assumed the presidency in January 2024, was identified by prosecutor Salazar as part of the criminal structure seeking to maintain control of the Provincial Court. Former assemblyman Pablo Muentes and Mayra Salazar worked intensively to place Hugo González as president of the Court of Guayas. On March 8, 2024, after persistent media pressure to obtain some response regarding the accusations made by the Prosecutor's Office, Hugo González resigned from his position to face the accusations against him.

=== Junior Roldán's Habeas Corpus ===
Since 2009, Junior Roldán, second in command of Los Choneros, accumulated 10 convictions totaling 83 years in prison, including charges for murder, organized crime, damage to property, and smuggling prohibited items into prison. Despite his extensive criminal record, in 2019, a penitentiary judge in Cuenca reduced his sentence to 35 years, scheduled until July 2043. Subsequently, he obtained parole in December 2022 for good behavior, but after an armed incident, he was arrested again. A change in prosecutor and a new habeas corpus led to the dismissal of the case. On February 14, 2023, he was released with an ankle monitor to serve the remainder of his sentence, but in March, he was attacked in El Triunfo, removed the ankle monitor, and was declared a fugitive. Colombian authorities confirmed his death on Monday, ending the saga of Roldán. Guillermo Valarezo Coello, a judge of the Provincial Court of Justice of Guayas, participated in the criminal chamber that in 2022 revoked the habeas corpus in favor of the drug trafficker Junior Roldán. The latter, leader of the criminal gang Los Águilas, sought to obtain house arrest or be transferred to a healthcare facility before being murdered. These significant judicial events highlight the complexity and challenges faced by the judicial system in the province of Guayas.

== Corruption and Judicial Manipulation by Pablo Muentes ==
=== Muentes against Banco del Pacífico ===
The legal dispute between Pablo Muentes and Banco del Pacífico, related to a loan of USD 314,800 granted in 1998, added a complexity to the judicial landscape. The financial institution accused Muentes of forging 13 payment notes for the loan, an allegation that the politician denied. The case became public in 2019 when Muentes filed a habeas data to have the bank record the cancellation of his debt, an event that was under the supervision of the then-first-instance judge, Reinaldo Cevallos, who was later arrested in connection with the Purga case. Despite Muentes' discontent, Cevallos granted the politician's request and ordered the bank to accept the payment, although the institution did not record the transaction in its accounting records. This controversial ruling led to Cevallos' promotion as a judge of the Provincial Court of Justice of Guayas. According to the investigation by the General State Prosecutor's Office in the Purga Case, it was revealed that Pablo Muentes, a former assemblyman of the Social Christian Party, led an organized crime network to influence the administration of justice in Guayas in his favor. His role as one of the leaders of the criminal organization is highlighted in the actions that allegedly compromised legal integrity in the province.

In the report published by the Prosecutor's Office, it was indicated that Muentes and his wife, Mónica Álvarado, benefited from judicial rulings that awarded them compensation of nearly USD 3.9 million from Banco del Pacífico, claiming damages caused. This benefit originated from a habeas data action against the banking institution, where allegedly they presented falsified and altered documents to support the repayment of loans received in 1989 and 1999. In this context, Nelson Mecías Ponce Murillo and Ramos Alberto Lino Tumbaco, civil judges in Guayas, were part of the Provincial Court that examined the trial of falsification of private instruments filed by Banco del Pacífico. Despite the irregularities presented by Muentes and his wife, the Court, by majority vote, rejected the appeal and upheld the decision of the first-level judge, dismissing the bank's lawsuit and benefiting the former assemblyman with nearly USD 4 million through alleged influence peddling, bribery, and prevarication.

=== Muentes implicated in irregular appropriation of land ===
Within the framework of the Purga Case, an investigation led by the General State Prosecutor's Office reveals that Fausto Alfonso Alarcón Gómez, cousin of Pablo Bolívar Muentes, former assemblyman of the Social Christian Party (PSC), would have illegally obtained 12 hectares of land in Durán. Guayas province. It is indicated that Alarcón Gómez benefited from habeas data resources to acquire a property valued at USD 200,000, without documentary support to validate the transaction. The corruption scheme involves Muentes' intervention in judicial decisions and the alleged manipulation of registry records. The investigation highlights the lack of proportional income to the real estate acquisition by Alarcón Gómez, whose economic activity was the sale of sandwiches. The judge, through a corrective habeas data, eliminated the original cadastral record and legitimized that of the former assemblyman's cousin, despite lacking documentary support.

During the arraignment hearing, Prosecutor Diana Salazar referred to the cousins as "the Muentes Alarcón duo." Despite Muentes not having properties in his name, the prosecution identifies him as Alarcón's frontman, who, according to the Financial Analysis Unit, owns approximately nine real estate properties with no significant bank movements. Alarcón, the general manager of several companies, including El Sanduchoncorp, Cafechonero, and Pigucord, has declared zero income tax since 2017, despite his business position. The acquisition of a 12-hectare plot of land in the Eloy Alfaro canton, Durán, has exposed corrupt practices in notaries and revealed the ability of individuals with low incomes to purchase high-value properties without proper oversight from authorities. In a landmark case, Eric Ramírez, an Ecuadorian-American citizen, faced invasion attempts in 2014 and encountered an irregular situation when trying to sell his land in 2022. The appraisal certificate revealed that the lot was registered under the name of Fausto Alfonso Alarcón Gómez, linked to various corporate activities. Alarcón allegedly managed to acquire properties totaling $200,000, despite his apparent low monthly income at El Sanduchón Corp. Furthermore, fake cadastral records and suspicious transactions in notaries were uncovered, raising questions about the legality of the operations. Eric Ramírez has initiated legal actions against Judge Andrea Patiño, as well as questioning prosecutors and police officers involved in the case. The cousins Muentes Alarcón are alleged to have obtained illegal rulings through false habeas data, with Muentes involved with Banco del Pacífico and Alarcón with a 12-hectare plot of land in Durán, according to the Prosecutor's Office. The acquisition of this land by Alarcón is said to have been carried out with falsified documentation and without supporting documents legitimizing the sale of the real estate belonging to the Ramírez family.

== Mercedes Villareal avoids arrest in the Purga case ==
The General State Prosecutor's Office planned to raid and arrest thirteen individuals, including Mercedes Leonor Villareal Vera, former provincial director of Disciplinary Control of the Judicial Council in Guayas, in connection with the Purga case. However, prior to the raids, Villareal had already left the country bound for Spain, thus avoiding her arrest. The investigation focuses on an alleged "criminal group" led by the former Social Christian assemblyman Pablo Muentes, the former president of the Provincial Court of Justice of Guayas Fabiola Gallardo, and the penal judge of Guayas Johan Marfetán. The structure aimed to influence the justice system to obtain favorable rulings in cases of interest, generating economic and material benefits. Although Mercedes Villareal Vera was not charged with organized crime in the Purga case, Attorney General Diana Salazar significantly mentioned her during the arraignment of the detainees. Mercedes Villareal Vera is linked to the investigation due to her alleged involvement in the filing of administrative proceedings maintained by Fabiola Gallardo. According to the Prosecutor's theory, the political power, represented by Pablo Muentes, sought to keep the members of the structure "immune to administrative sanctions" to ensure control of the Judiciary in Guayas. The current president of the Judiciary, Álvaro Román, confirmed that Villareal was dismissed from her position after it was discovered that she archived proceedings with prior jurisdictional declaration, processes that involved the dismissal of officials. At least two out of the four administrative proceedings were archived by the former director of Disciplinary Control of the Judicial Council in Guayas.

=== Administrative Movement of Judges ===
Mercedes Villareal Vera faces additional accusations according to the General State Prosecutor's Office, related to her alleged involvement in administrative changes of judges who did not support the judicial objectives of the criminal structure. One of the mentioned cases is the transfer of Judge Ulises Manuel Torres, who refused to rule in favor of the interests in the Banco del Pacífico case. Pablo Muentes allegedly requested from Fabiola Gallardo and Mercedes Villareal his transfer through an administrative action. The newly appointed judge, Alberto Lino Tumbaco, purportedly was specifically assigned to ratify the desired ruling in the mentioned case. Villareal was appointed during the administration of the former president of the Judicial Council, Wilman Terán, and was subsequently removed from her position by Álvaro Román, who assumed office after Terán's arrest in the Metástasis case. The new majority of the Judiciary was composed of the judges Fausto Murillo and Yolanda Yupangui.
