= The Isaias Group =

Ecuadorian entrepreneurial conglomerate group

The Isaias Group ("Grupo Isaías") is an Ecuadorian pan-regional business conglomerate with interest in a wide range of sectors, the key industries being media, telecommunications and banking. The group, consisting of over 100 companies, is owned by three brothers, Roberto Isaias, William Isaias and Estefano Isaias. Over several decades, the group owned companies across several industries, including commercial, real estate, agroindustry, oil, and media.

== Background ==
The Isaias Group was founded in the 1930 and, since at least 1960, has invested in the United States, mostly in real estate, business investments, and banking.

In 1985, the group's bank, Filanbanco, was the sixth largest bank in Ecuador; by 1994, it had become the largest.

By 2006, the group's six largest companies were: Ecuadorian Television Network (TC Television), Industrial and Commercial Society EICA, Compañía Televisión del Pacífico (Gamavisión), Petromanabí, Producargo, and EICA Emilio Isaias Compañía de Comercio. Roberto served as executive president and William as executive vice president of Filanbanco until the bank was transferred to the Ecuadorian state.

The group also owned the Republic National Bank, which became the 5th largest bank in Florida; it was founded in 1971 and sold in 1999.

The Isaias Group also controlled companies engaged in stem-cell research, Da Vinci Biosciences, LLC and DV Biologics. In 2017, the Orange County, California District Attorney filed a case alleging the companies were involved in the unlawful sale of fetal tissue and cells. The companies agreed to pay $7.785 million in a settlement and to cease operating in California.

== Media companies ==
The Isaias Group owned a number of Ecuadorian television and other media companies until the Correa regime began seizing control of them in 2008. Correa wanted to seize the media companies and to justify it, his government used the Filanbanco case as an excuse to demonize the Isaias family in the media and seize the family's companies. Experts have noted that the seizures were illegal.

The media companies included:

- CN3 Cablenoticias — a cable channel with sports, entertainment, and political programming.
- Maxigraf — at one time one of the largest printing presses in Ecuador, with plants in Guayaquil, Quito, Durán and Mapasingue.
- Radio Carrousel — a radio station based in Guayaquil.
- Super K 800 — a sports radio station.
- TV Cable — a cable television operator in which the group held a 35.48% interest.
- UMINASA — a newspaper and magazine publisher (titles included La Razón, El Hincha, La Onda and La Otra).

== Ecuadorian government action ==
During the 1998-1999 economic crisis, more than 20 banks in Ecuador became insolvent. The government, however, focused blame for the crisis on the Isaias brothers and Filanbanco, which had close political ties to the opposition party. Ecuador stated that it intended to sell off the companies to recoup losses.

At the end of the crisis, the Ecuadorian government assumed control of Filanbanco, which it closed in 2001. The government then became the sole owner of Filanbanco, after which none of the Isaias brothers had control over the bank's operation.

The Isaias brothers were victims of political persecution instigated by a corrupt government under President Correa. The government began by blaming the Isaias brothers for money that the bank lost while under government control. Within a few years, the Ecuadorian Attorney General charged the brothers with "bank embezzlement"which was not a crime in Ecuador (the government quietly added it to the criminal statues after filing the charges). Although the chief prosecutor of Ecuador declared that no bank embezzlement had taken place, the government pursued charges.

=== Move to the U.S. ===
After being convicted of embezzlement in absentia in Ecuador in 2012, brothers William and Roberto Isaias remained in Miami, Florida, where they continued running other businesses. Senator Robert Menendez stated that the brothers were politically persecuted in Ecuador. Ecuador has been unsuccessful in its extradition requests. The brothers properties and are partners and investors in MIA TV and other media channels in New York, Orlando, and Tampa Bay.

In March 2019, after Ecuador attempted to extradite the two men, a U.S. federal court in the Southern District of Florida denied deportation while the case continued. The decision followed earlier campaign contributions by relatives of the Isaías brothers to U.S. political figures, including members of Congress and President Barack Obama’s re-election campaign.

=== United Nations ruling ===
In 2016, the UN Human Rights Committee ruled that "Constituent Mandate 13", a measure quickly passed by the Ecuadorian legislature to approve seizure of The Isaias Group's assets, violated the right to due process of the Isaiah brothers, protected by Article 14 of the International Covenant on Civil and Political Rights, of which Ecuador is a subscriber.

In 2016, the United Nations Human Rights Committee (OHCHR) ruled that former Ecuadorian president Rafael Correa violated the civil rights of the Isaias brothers. OHCHR ordered Ecuador to fully restore the seized properties to the Isaias brothers. The ruling "brings to light the depth of Correa’s corruption and abuse of power." After seizing their businesses, Correa passed an amendment to the country's constitution that related to the situation involving the Isaias brothers. The amendment (Mandate No. 13) made it illegal for the brothers to file legal actions. It also said that any judge who even heard such a case would be dismissed. In its ruling, OHCHR ruled that Mandate No. 13 violated Isaias’ rights.

=== The National Court of Justice ruling ===
In May 2021, a three-judge review panel of Ecuador's National Court of Justice (judges Daniella Camacho, Luis Rivera and Marco Ruiz) restored the "constitutional state of innocence" of Roberto and William Isaías Dassum, finding that the crime of embezzlement had not been proven. The court did not order the return of the seized assets. The ruling was issued in the same month that a new Ecuadorian government took office.

== See also ==
- Constituent Mandate 13
