= Empresa Eléctrica del Ecuador =

Empresa Eléctrica del Ecuador (literally Electric Company of Ecuador) or Emelec was the name of an Ecuadorian electric company based in the city of Guayaquil.

Until 2004, it was owned by Fernando Aspiazu who used to be president of Banco del Progreso, Ecuador's second largest bank that was closed in March 1999. In 2004, the Ecuadorian state had debts of $400 million and $800 million with state-owned Centro Nacional de Control de Energía (Cenace) to EMELEC. Therefore, in 2004, the government of Alfredo Palacio confined by decree the administration of Emelec's actives for five years to Corporación para la Administración Temporal Eléctrica de Guayaquil (CATEG; literally Corporation for the Temporal Electric Administration of Guayaquil), an entity administrated by Venezuelan power company Electricidad de Valencia (Eleval).

A group of employees of EMELEC founded the sports club Club Sport Emelec in 1929, which nowadays is known for one of Ecuador's top football teams.
