= Galo Chiriboga =

Ecuadorian politician

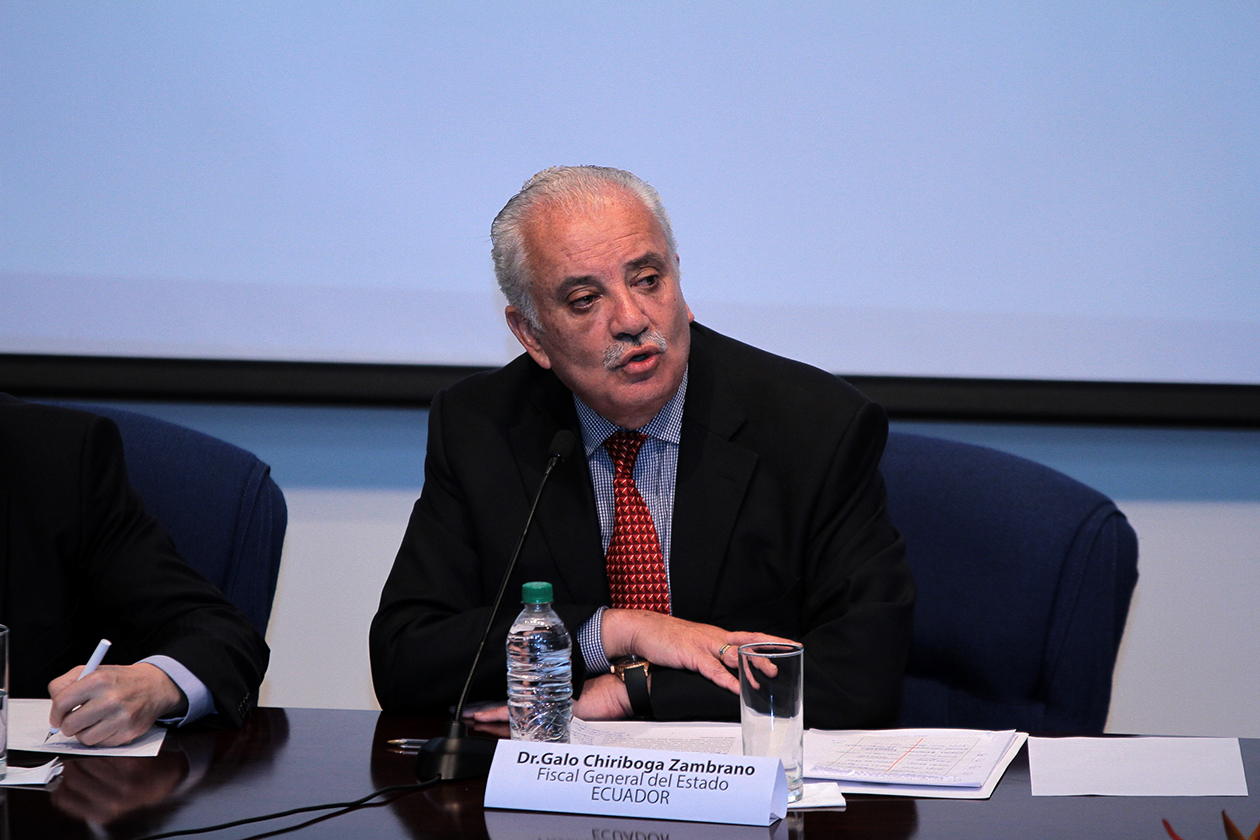
- Galo Chiriboga

General Attorney of Ecuador
- Incumbent
- Assumed office 2011

Galo Chiriboga is an Ecuadorian lawyer, politician, administrator and the president of "La Asociación Interamericana de Juristas". He is best known as the "Oil Minister for Ecuador".

He was Minister of Trabajo, de Gobierno y Presidente de Petroecuador during the Alfredo Palacio regime and Minister of Petroleum and Mines during the administration of Rafael Correa. In 2011, he became General Attorney of Ecuador.

He has been linked with the off-shore firm Mossack Fonseca and the Panama Papers scandal.
