= Filanbanco =

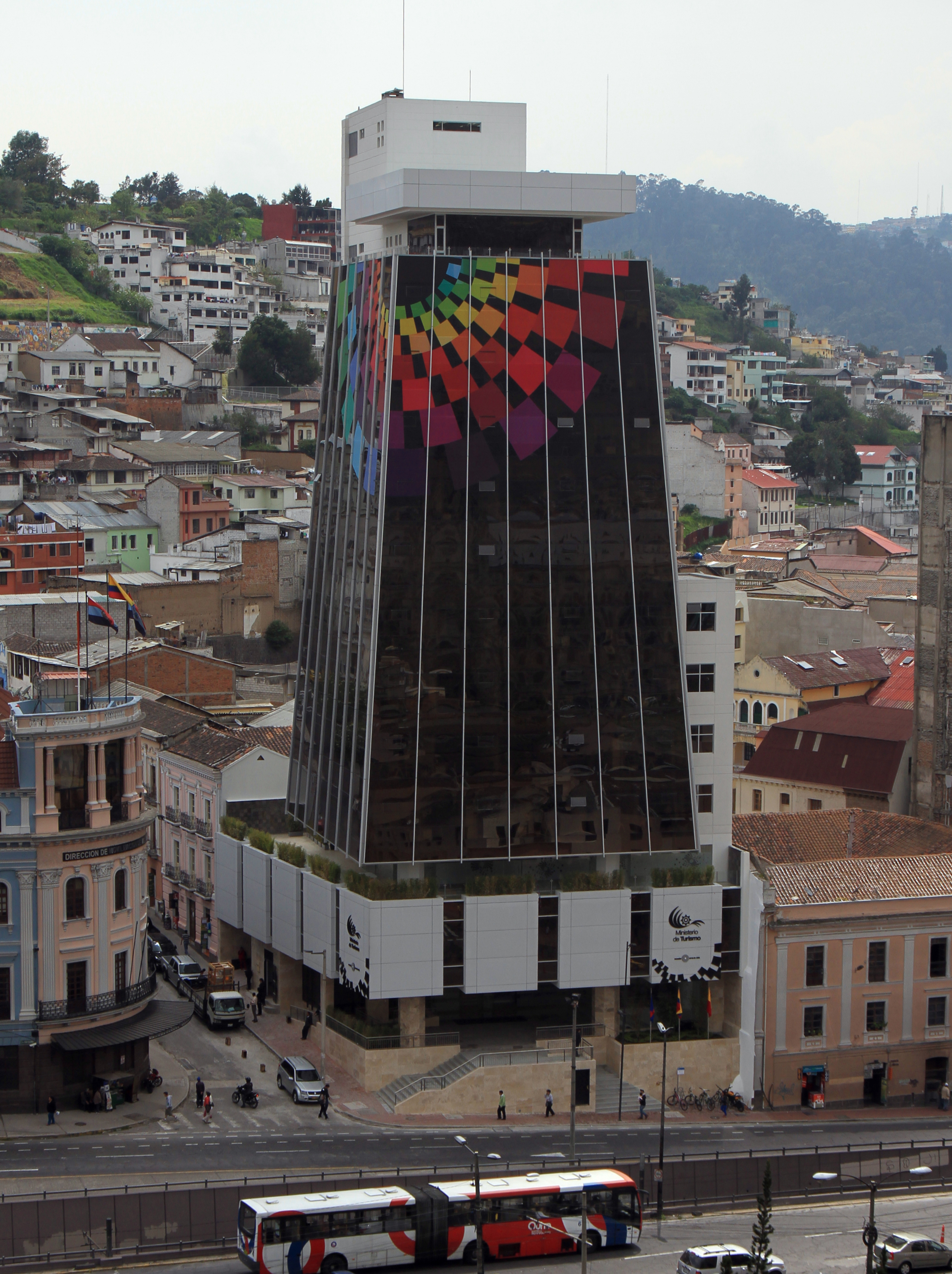
- Old Filanbanco building in Quito.
- Industry: Financial services
- Predecessor: La Filantrópica
- Founded: 1908 in Guayaquil
- Defunct: 2001
- Fate: Failure after banking crisis
- Headquarters: Guayaquil, Ecuador
- Area served: Ecuador
- Products: Banking services
- Owner: The Isaias Group and later Government of Ecuador

Filanbanco was the largest bank in Ecuador until it went bankrupt in 2001 following the banking crisis of 1998. The bank was originally founded in the city of Guayaquil in 1908.

== History ==
=== Beginnings ===
The bank was originally called La Filantrópica (The Philanthropist). Under the leadership of Pedro Isaías Barquet, La Filantrópica promoted the development of small industry, commerce, and agriculture, and became established as a strong and solvent financial institution. At the time of Isaías Barquet's death in 1960, the family decided to save the bank and inject it with capital.

It was acquired in 1960 by the Isaías Group (Grupo Isaías), who decided to change its name to Filanbanco. They injected capital into the bank, aiming to provide Guayaquil with a bank that would further the expansion of the commercial and agricultural sector of the Littoral Region, whose trade in products like bananas and cacao was booming.

The bank belonged to the Isaías family for three generations.

=== Crisis ===
During the 1998-1999 economic crisis, over 20 banks in Ecuador became insolvent. The government, however, focused all its blame for the crisis on the Isaias brothers and Filanbanco, which had close political ties to the opposition party.

Due to changes made to regulations, Filanbanco was converted into a "central bank" after the government took over ownership. As such, Filanbanco had to absorb all other failing banks and that was the main reason for its closure in 2001, over three years under ownership and management by the Ecuadorian government.

At the end of the financial crisis, the Ecuadorian government assumed control of Filanbanco, which it eventually closed down in 2001. The bank crisis (“Crisis Bancaria”) started after the government of Ecuador took over and became the sole owner of Filanbanco. None of the Isaias brothers had any control over bank operation after that date.

==== Beginning of the 1998-1999 economic crisis ====
At the end of the nineties, Ecuador went through external and internal problems with its economy. The loss of the manufacturing sector in general had a severe impact on the financial system. Ecuadorian banking suffered a serious crisis from 1998 to 1999, when nearly all banks requested liquidity credits from the Central Bank of Ecuador (ECB). These loans were granted by the ECB in 1998 and were based on solvency. ECB certified the solvency of Filanbanco and approved the bank for access to stabilization loans.

Only three years after assuming control of Filanbanco, the government shut it down. In 2002, the government took steps to liquidate the bank, but the process was extremely slow. At the time of its closure, the bank had a $950 million loan portfolio.

=== Aftermath ===
==== Controversial "bank embezzlement" charges ====
As the bank began to rapidly lose money while it was under government control (a report issued during the time that the state owned and ran Filanbanco revealed that the bank had lost 814 million dollars during the period in which it was managed by the government), the government blamed the Isaias brothers, and began to scapegoat the two men. In June 2000, the Ecuadorian Attorney General Falconi Puig charged the Isaias brothers with "bank embezzlement." Up until the charges were filed, such a crime didn't exist in the country. The government quickly and quietly added it to the penal code and then filed the charges.

The bank embezzlement charges were controversial. For example, the manager of the Central Bank of Ecuador told the Attorney General that there had been no misuse of funds while Filanbanco was under control of the Isaias Group, and charges were filed anyway. By 2004, the issue had reached the country's Supreme Court. However, then-president Lucio Gutierrez, hearing rumors that the Supreme Court might rule in favor of the Isaias brothers, dismissed every judge on the Supreme Court. (Gutierrez was “politically crippled and on the brink of removal from office” before he dismissed the court).

Three years after the government began investigating the Isaias for the alleged bank embezzlement, the Chief Prosecutor of Ecuador declared that there was no bank embezzlement. His conclusion was ignored by the government.

==== President Rafael Correa and the seizures of over 150 companies ====
The issue was quiet for several years until 2007, when Rafael Correa began as president of Ecuador after winning as a left-wing economist. As soon as he took office, he formed a new committee, which he highly publicized, to investigate the Filanbanco “bank robbery” of 1998-1999. Even before the investigation began, Correa repeatedly used the term “corrupt bankers” when referring to Filanbanco’s owners, the Isaias’.

In 2008, on Correa's orders, the Ecuadorian government seized over 150 Isaias Group companies "under false pretenses." The stated purpose that the government gave was that it was attempting to compensate account holders of the bank Filanbanco. Among the companies seized were media companies owned by the Isaias brothers, including prominent media outlets TC Television, Gamavision, and Cablevision. The Isaias Group’s TV channels captured 40 percent of the nation’s evening news audience.

After seizing the companies, Correa appointed close friends and political allies to run the businesses. El Telegrafo, a prominent newspaper that the state had seized, was seized for the official reason of selling it off and using the money to pay back Filanbanco account holders who had lost money. Instead, the government kept the newspaper and made it an official government public newspaper.

Although the stated purpose of the seizures was the liquidate the companies and use the proceeds to pay back Filanbanco account holders, the government kept ownership of the companies. Within years, the performance of the companies rapidly deteriorated and most were heavily devalued.

== See also ==
- Banking in Ecuador
