= South American territorial disputes =

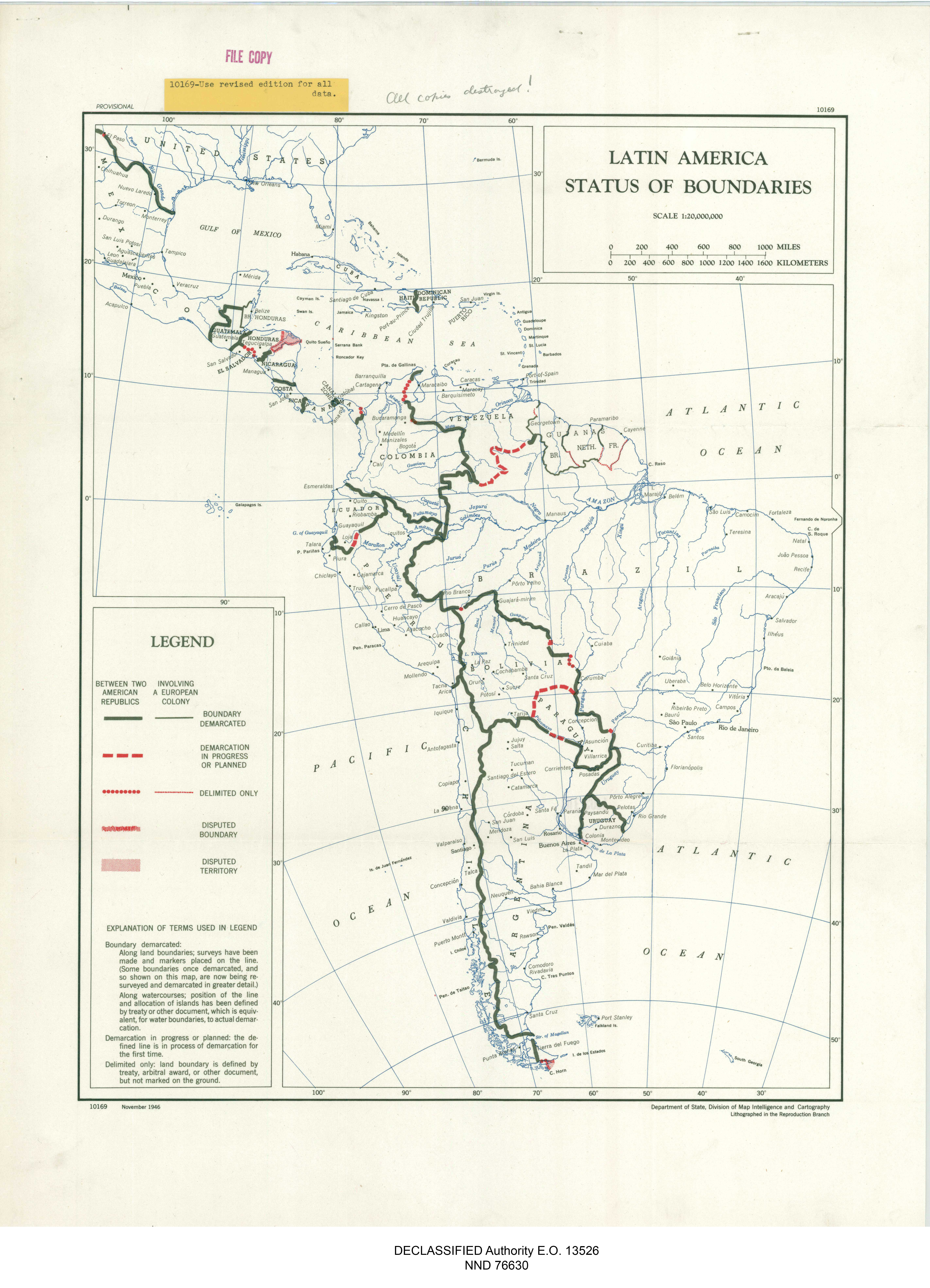
Latin American territorial disputes by 1946.

The South American territorial disputes are the territorial disputes and litigations that have developed in South America since the aftermath of the continent's wars of independence, which have shaped the current political geography of the region. These conflicts have been resolved through both military and diplomatic means. The most recent conflict in the Americas of this nature was the Cenepa War in 1995, between Ecuador and Peru.

== History ==
=== 18th century conflicts ===
- Guaraní War (1753–1756): Armed conflict involving the Guarani tribes of the Jesuit missions against Spanish and Portuguese troops, as a consequence of the Treaty of Madrid, which defined a demarcation line between Spanish and Portuguese colonial territory in South America. The established boundary was demarcated by the Uruguay River, with Portugal owning the territory to the east of the river and Spain to the west. With this, the seven Jesuit missions east of the Uruguay River, known as the Misiones Orientales, were to be dismantled and moved to the Spanish west side of the river. A combined force of 3,000 Spanish and Portuguese soldiers fought the Guarani in the Battle of Caiboaté. In the end, the Spanish–Portuguese joint army occupied the seven Missions, the Guarani were evacuated to the west of the Uruguay River, the allied army remained in the Missions for ten months, the Portuguese retreated to the Pardo River without being able to agree on the border at the headwaters of the Ibicuí River and without handing over Colonia del Sacramento to Spain.

=== 19th century conflicts ===
- Luso-Brazilian conquest of the Banda Oriental (1816–1820): Conflict unleashed in present-day Uruguay, Argentine Mesopotamia and southern Brazil, which resulted in the annexation of the Banda Oriental to the Kingdom of Brazil, with the name of Cisplatina.
- Cisplatine War (1825–1828): Conflict over the possession of Cisplatina Province, at that time part of the Empire of Brazil, and formerly of the United Provinces of the Río de la Plata, today Argentina. The war concluded with the territory becoming the new state of Uruguay instead of its reincorporation to the United Provinces.
- Gran Colombia–Peru War (1828–1829): The first armed conflict that arose from a territorial dispute between Colombia and Peru for sovereignty over the regions of Maynas in the Amazon, Jaén in the Andes, Tumbes and Guayaquil on the Pacific coast. This war gave rise to the border conflict between Peru and Ecuador and the Colombian–Peruvian war of 1932-1933.
- Cauca War (1832): Armed conflict between New Granada and Ecuador for the sovereignty of the neighboring provinces of Pasto, Popayán and Buenaventura. It was part of the broader Colombian–Ecuadorian territorial dispute.
- War of the Confederation (1836–1839): Military confrontation between the Peru-Bolivian Confederation, led by Andrés de Santa Cruz, who intended to unite Peru and Bolivia into a single nation, and on the other hand, the coalition of the Chilean Army and the Restoration Army of Peru who opposed the ideas of Santa Cruz and eventually defeated the confederation.
- Tarija War (1837–1839): Armed conflict that began in 1837 when the then Argentine foreign minister and governor of Buenos Aires, Juan Manuel de Rosas, declared war on the Peru-Bolivian Confederation over the Tarija Question—a territorial dispute concerning Tarija—for the support of Andrés de Santa Cruz to the Unitarian Party, and for the suspicion that the Peru-Bolivian Confederation would try to annex the provinces of the Argentine Northwest.
- Paraná War (1845–1850): Armed conflict between the governments of France and England (with the support of the Unitarian Party of Argentina and the Colorado Party of Uruguay) against the National Party of Uruguay and the Argentine federals in the framework of the Guerra Grande of Uruguay and the Argentine Civil War that ended with the victory of the Argentine Confederation. The conflict began with the Anglo-French blockade of the Río de la Plata, which had as its motive to harm the federal side and pressure so that the two European powers could be awarded maritime rights and, above all, river rights in Argentine territory.
- Spanish–South American War (1865–1866): Armed conflict that took place on the Chilean and Peruvian coasts, in which Spain fought on the one hand, against Peru and Chile, mainly, and Bolivia and Ecuador, to a lesser degree. The diplomatic conflict began between Peru and Spain due to what became known as the Talambo incident and the occupation of the Chincha Islands by the Spanish Navy on April 14, 1864. The conflict ended with the official recognition of Peru's independence by Spain.
- First Ecuadorian–Peruvian War (1857–1860): Armed conflict that began when Ecuador attempted to sell Amazon basin land claimed by Peru in order to settle a debt with British creditors. When diplomatic relations between the two countries broke down, prior to the fragmentation of the Ecuadorian government into several competing factions, the Peruvian government ordered a blockade of Ecuador's ports in order to force the cancellation of the sale, and the official acknowledgement of Peruvian ownership of the disputed territories. The conflict ended with the occupation of Guayaquil and the signing of the Treaty of Mapasingue, which temporarily ended the dispute between both states.
- Paraguayan War (1864–1870): Armed conflict between Paraguay and the Triple Alliance, a coalition made up of Brazil, Uruguay and Argentina. The conflict began at the end of 1864 between Brazil and Paraguay, with the Triple Alliance being formed the next year. As a result, Paraguay lost a large part of its territory (160,000 km²).
- War of the Pacific (1879–1883): Armed conflict between Chile against Peru and Bolivia. The war ended with the annexation to Chile of the Bolivian Litoral Department, and the Peruvian territories of Tarapacá and Tacna–Arica, which began a territorial dispute between Chile and Peru.
- East Patagonia, Tierra del Fuego and Strait of Magellan dispute (1842-1881): It was a diplomatic dispute and a competition for effective control over the southernmost part of the South American continent between Chile and Argentina. The tension nearly led to war between the two countries in 1878; however, the conflict was settled by the Treaty of 1881, which defined the border along the Andes Mountains up to the 52nd parallel south. The treaty placed the Strait of Magellan under Chilean sovereignty with a regime of free navigation, divided the main island of Tierra del Fuego between the two nations, and assigned the islands south of the Beagle Channel to Chile.
- Acre War (1899–1903): Armed conflict between Bolivia and Brazil that also affected Peru for the control of the territory of Acre, rich in rubber trees and gold deposits. It concluded with the victory of Brazil and the consequent annexation of territories that belonged or had been claimed by Bolivia and Peru.

=== 20th century conflicts ===
- Chaco War (1932–1935): Armed conflict between Paraguay and Bolivia over the control of the Chaco Boreal. It was the largest-scale contemporary war that took place in South America, mobilizing nearly half a million men, it is also the first on the continent in which conventional weapons such as tanks, machine guns and tactics such as trench warfare are used. The first air battle fought in Latin American skies took place in this conflict.
- Colombia–Peru War (1932–1933): Armed conflict between Colombia and Peru that took place in the regions near the Putumayo River and the city of Leticia, for the sovereignty of this area of the Amazon basin rich in rubber trees. The war ended with the ratification of the Salomón-Lozano Treaty of 1922.
- Ecuadorian–Peruvian War (1941): Border war fought between July 5–31, 1941. During the war, Peru occupied the western Ecuadorian province of El Oro and parts of the Andean province of Loja. Although the war took place during World War II, it is unrelated to that conflict, as neither country was supported by either the Allies or the Axis.
- Beagle conflict (1888-1984; crisis in 1978): Territorial dispute between Argentina and Chile over the determination of the layout of the eastern mouth of the Beagle Channel, which affected the sovereignty of the islands located within and to the south of the channel, and to the east of Cape Horn and its adjacent maritime spaces.
- Paquisha War (1981): Military clash that took place between January and February 1981 between Ecuador and Peru over the control of three watchposts. While Peru felt that the matter was already decided in the Ecuadorian–Peruvian War of 1941, Ecuador claimed that the Rio de Janeiro Protocol was not executable because a 78 km section of the border was not precisely defined.
- Falklands War (1982): Armed conflict between Argentina and the United Kingdom that occurred in the Falklands, South Georgia and the South Sandwich Islands for sovereignty over these southern archipelagos. Argentine forces first occupied the islands on April 2, 1982, and the United Kingdom took control of all the archipelagos by June 14 of the same year.
- Cenepa War (1995): Brief and localized military conflict between Ecuador and Peru, fought over control of an area in the Cordillera del Cóndor, near the border between the two countries. The conflict is the most recent of its nature.

== See also ==
- List of current territorial disputes in South America
- Bolivian–Peruvian territorial dispute
- Bolivian–Chilean territorial dispute
  - Día del Mar
- Chilean–Peruvian territorial dispute
  - Punto Concordia dispute
- Colombian–Peruvian territorial dispute
- Colombian–Ecuadorian territorial dispute
- Ecuadorian–Peruvian territorial dispute
- Guyana–Venezuela territorial dispute
- Falkland Islands sovereignty dispute
- South Georgia and the South Sandwich Islands sovereignty dispute
- Southern Patagonian Ice Field dispute
