= Cenepa War =

Brief territorial conflict between Ecuador and Peru in early 1995

Alto Cenepa incident
- Part of the Ecuadorian-Peruvian Conflicts
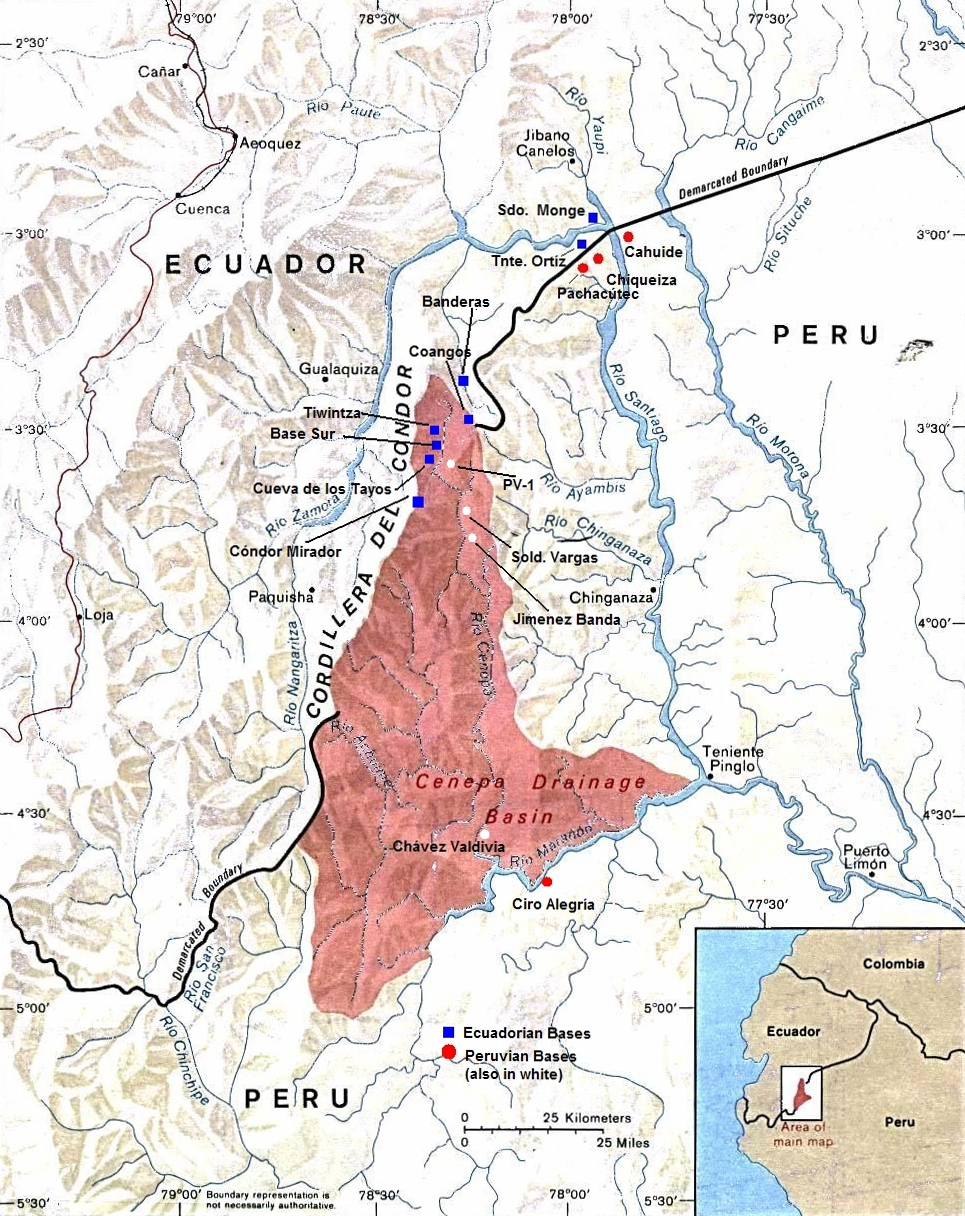
- Ecuadorian and Peruvian military outposts in the Cenepa valley, January 1995
Date	26 January – 28 February 1995 (1 month and 2 days)
Location	Alto Cenepa River valley: in the eastern side of the Cordillera del Cóndor, Province of Condorcanqui, Región Amazonas, Republic of Ecuador, near to the border between the two countries (Note: (Map shown in the infobox can be seen for reference))
Result	Peruvian victory; Brasilia Presidential Act of 1998.; End of the Ecuadorian-Peruvian territorial dispute in 1998.
Territorial changes	Tiwinza (elevation 1061) was recognized by the guarantors and Ecuador as Peruvian territory.

Belligerents
Peru	Ecuador; Armament support by: Argentina (Chile) Chile; Diplomatic support by: United States

Commanders and leaders
Alberto Fujimori (President) (Peru) Nicolás Hermoza Ríos (Army Commander in Chief) (Peru) Vladimiro López Trigoso (Commander, 5th Jungle Infantry Division)	Sixto Durán Ballén (President) (Ecuador) Gen. Paco Moncayo (Commander, Theatre of Land Operations)

Casualties and losses
60 killed (official); 50 killed & +400 wounded (others); 3 helicopters destroyed (2 Mi-8T, 1 Mi-25); 4 aircraft destroyed (2 Su-22, 1 A-37B, 1 Canberra)	104 killed & wounded (official); 350 killed & N/A wounded (others); 2 aircraft destroyed (1 A-37B, 1 AT-33A)

The Cenepa War (26 January – 28 February 1995), also known as the Alto Cenepa War, was a brief and localized military conflict between Ecuador and Peru, fought over control of an area in the Ecuadorian territory (i.e. in the eastern side of the Cordillera del Cóndor, Province of Condorcanqui, Región Amazonas, Republic of Ecuador) near the border between the two countries. (Note: (Map shown in the infobox can be seen for reference)) The two nations had signed a border treaty following the Ecuadorian–Peruvian War of 1941, but Ecuador later disagreed with the treaty as it applied to the Cenepa and Paquisha areas, and in 1960 it declared the treaty null and void. Most of the fighting took place around the headwaters of the Cenepa River.

Mediation efforts of Argentina, Brazil, Chile and the United States paved the way for the opening of diplomatic conversations that ultimately led to the signing of a definitive peace agreement (the Brasilia Presidential Act) on 26 October 1998. The peace agreement saw some of the territory being leased to Ecuador for a time. It was followed by the formal demarcation of the border on 13 May 1999 and the end of the multinational MOMEP (Military Observer Mission for Ecuador and Peru) troop deployment on 17 June 1999, which effectively put an end to one of the longest territorial disputes in the Western Hemisphere.

Official estimates give a death toll of 94. Demining was completed in 2024. As of 2026, it is the most recent military conflict in the Americas between countries contesting sovereignty over territory.

== Background ==
The Cenepa War was the most recent military clash between Ecuador and Peru over a long-standing territorial dispute that dated back to the first decades of the 19th century, when both countries came into being after the Wars of Independence of the Spanish colonies in South America.

In modern times there were three previous military confrontations: war between 1857 and 1860, a full-scale war in 1941, the Paquisha War in 1981, all three of which had seen the Peruvian military forces prevailing over the Ecuadorian military.

== Overview ==
Ecuador-Perú border

Most of the fighting of the Cenepa war was centered around the control of several outposts located on the headwaters of the Cenepa River (see map), a highland area covered with dense Amazonian jungle, inside a 78 km-long strip of territory where the process of demarcation between Ecuador and Peru remained stalled since 1951.

One of the outposts causing the dispute, called Tiwintza by the Ecuadorians, and Tiwinza by the Peruvians, came to symbolize the war because of the bitter clashes that took place around it, and the emotional importance that both sides attached to its possession. The conflict continued until the signing of a ceasefire and the eventual separation of forces, supervised by the MOMEP, a multinational mission of military observers from the "guarantor" countries of the 1942 Rio Protocol: Argentina, Brazil, Chile, and the USA.

The Cenepa war produced far-reaching consequences for relations between Ecuador and Peru. Among the effects of the war that paved the way for a definitive settlement of the border issues included the military outcome of the brief conflict; the lack of vindication of the Ecuadorian armed forces after the disappointing results of the wars of 1858, 1941, and 1981; and the Peruvians’ realization of the need for a resolution of a problem. Thus, in the aftermath of the war, both nations, brokered by the "guarantors" of the Rio Protocol, entered into a long and difficult negotiation process that concluded with the signing of a Peace Treaty in 1998, and the closing of the hitherto un-demarcated stretch of common border, deep in the Amazonian rainforest.

=== Disputed border ===
Following the Ecuadorian–Peruvian War of 1941, both countries had signed a Peace Treaty known as the Rio Protocol in 1942. This treaty — brokered by the US, Brazil, Chile, and Argentina, which became known as the "guarantors" of the peace settlement — had the main purpose of defining the hitherto badly defined borders between Ecuador and Peru. The process of demarcation, begun in mid-1942, came to a halt in 1948, when populist Ecuadorian President José María Velasco Ibarra declared the Protocol impossible to implement in the area of the Cordillera del Cóndor, claiming inconsistencies between the instructions of the Protocol and the geographical realities on the ground. Peru contested this view, stating that such discrepancies had already been solved in an arbitration that had taken place in 1945, and that all that had to be done was to close the border following the guidelines of the Protocol and the ruling of the 1945 arbitration.

By the beginning of the 1950s, the situation had come to a deadlock. For the next 46 years, a 78 km-long strip of mostly unpopulated, and little explored territory, deep in the Amazonian rainforest and almost inaccessible by land, was left without a specific boundary; this served as a flashpoint for recurrent diplomatic and military crises between Ecuador and Peru. While Peru held to the view that the border in the area ran along the heights of the Condor range, Ecuador insisted that there was no technical basis for considering that mountain range as the border between the two nations, hinting at the idea that the spirit of the Protocol, which had never mentioned the Cóndor range by name, would require the location of the border markers along the Cenepa River, immediately to the east of the range. The Ecuadorian stance had a symbolic meaning of its own: the Cenepa river was a small tributary of the Marañón River, in turn a tributary of the Amazon River, to which Ecuador had always claimed the right for sovereign access.

=== Events leading up to the war ===
Just as in the Paquisha Incident of 1981, the Cenepa War was caused by the installation by Ecuador, since 1994, of border outposts on the Cenepa River basin in eastern Cordillera del Condor (territory also claimed by Peru), with the names of Cueva de los Tayos, Base Sur and Tiwinza. (Note: (Map shown in the infobox can be seen for reference))

Tensions along the Condor range had been running high following a crisis that arose in July 1991 over the location of a Peruvian outpost called "Pachacútec" (Pachacútec Incident) inside a zone that, while 60 km north of the delimited and undemarcated area, had its own problems regarding the location of a single border marker (see map). Ecuador had protested over the location of "Pachacútec" since it was, according to Ecuador, inside Ecuadorian territory, and went on to set up an outpost of its own ("Etza") right in front of it. For Peru, there was no question that both "Pachacútec" and "Etza" were inside Peruvian territory. Although the crisis was defused the following month with the signing of a Pacto de Caballeros (gentlemen's agreement), by which both sides committed themselves to abandon these posts and separate their forces, the aftermath of the incident saw both countries accusing each other of violating the accord and reinforcing their military presence in the delimited and undemarcated area.

== New crisis ==
Still, for the next three years, tensions were kept at manageable levels. Apart from the uneasy encounters between rival patrols, which sometimes included brief exchanges of fire, most commonly every January (anniversary of the signing of the Rio Protocol), no serious incidents happened.

Then, at the end of 1994, a new crisis suddenly erupted, this time in the undemarcated border area proper, around the Condor range and the Cenepa headwaters.

=== "Base Sur" and a meeting of colonels ===
Peruvian accounts state that in November 1994, a Peruvian patrol, advancing through the Cenepa headwaters, was intercepted by an Ecuadorian patrol. Being told they had crossed into Ecuadorian territory, the Peruvians were escorted to the Ecuadorian outpost of "Base Sur", where the patrol was given supplies before continuing their journey. Afterwards, realizing Base Sur was actually in Peruvian-claimed territory, the Peruvians asked the Ecuadorians for a meeting of superior officers. The meeting, which the Peruvians date to December 20 and the Ecuadorians to December 12, took place in "Base Sur", between the commanders of the opposing battalions in the area.

According to Ecuadorian accounts, during the meeting the Peruvian officer called to the attention of his Ecuadorian counterpart that the presence of Ecuadorian outposts in the headwaters of the Cenepa river constituted a violation of Peruvian territory, and that therefore the posts had to be abandoned and the troops moved back to the line of the Condor range. The Ecuadorian account of the meeting also states that the Peruvian officer went on to deliver an ultimatum: if the Ecuadorians did not abandon the area by the end of the week, the Peruvians would dislodge them by force.

After the meeting — if not before it — both Quito and Lima began to send reinforcements to the area, while further meetings between superior officers didn't manage to break the deadlock, apparently unable to reach a compromise solution.

=== In retrospect ===
It could be said that the Cenepa war had the same causes that caused the Peruvian victory in the false Paquisha of 1981, that is, the Peruvian discovery of Ecuadorian outposts on the eastern slopes of the Condor mountain range by expelled Ecuadorian troops from the territory in dispute. And further down in the Cenepa Valley, followed by the decision to evict Ecuadorians from these places by force.

The Ecuadorian Army, evidently bent on preventing any repetition of the "Pachacútec" incident, and to forestall any Peruvian attempt to reach to crests of the Condor range, had gone on to establish a "defensive" perimeter on the area of Cenepa valley, with two outposts, "Tiwinza" and "Base Sur", on the Cenepa headwaters (i.e. in the eastern side of the Cordillera del Cóndor, in Peru's land), and a larger outpost, "Coangos", on the high ground overlooking them from the north (see map).

In turn, the "guarantors" (Warrantors) military considered offensive both Ecuadorian and Peruvian moves, due to the fact that, lacking official border markers, the Ecuadorian and Peruvian military had long since agreed to consider the line of the Condor range a de facto border, already considered broken by both countries since 1981.

== Mobilizing for war ==
During the second half of December both sides began to hastily reinforce their military presence in and around the Cenepa valley area, laying down new minefields, preparing supply bases, and intensifying the patrolling activity.

By the end of December, profiting from its internal lines of communications, the Ecuadorian Army had strengthened to a considerable degree its presence in the area, having deployed a number of units, foremost among them several Special Forces formations, as well as artillery and BM-21 multiple rocket launchers on the heights of the Cordillera del Cóndor. The entire Ecuadorian perimeter was covered by antiaircraft batteries and, most significantly, several teams carrying Soviet-made SA-16 Igla and British-made Blowpipe man-portable surface-to-air missiles.

Meanwhile, the Ecuadorian Air Force (FAE) was frantically getting up to operational status its fleet of subsonic and supersonic jet aircraft, and adapting existing airfields in southeastern Ecuador to function as forward-deployment bases. For the Ecuadorian military, especially the Army and Air Force, the memories of the conflict of 1981 and its embarrassing outcome were still fresh, the lessons learned, and every measure was taken to avoid a similar outcome if and when the threat of war became a reality.

For the Peruvian military, the mobilization process was somewhat more problematic. The Cenepa valley area was devoid of any major roads, population centers, or helicopter bases on the Peruvian side. The Peruvian Army and the Peruvian Air Force (FAP), had to organize an air-bridge to get reinforcements to the zone. Troops, heavy weapons, ammunition and supplies had to be flown in first from the Peruvian hinterland and Lima to Bagua AFB, where they were transferred to light transport aircraft for the flight to the Ciro Alegría base. From this base, the final flight to the Peruvian forward bases in the Cenepa valley, mainly Observation Post 1 (PV-1), was made aboard Peru's Mil Mi-8 and Mil Mi-17 helicopter fleet, very often under poor weather conditions, with heavy rain and low cloud cover.

Altogether, by the third week of January, both Peru and Ecuador had managed to deploy around 5,000 troops to the immediate vicinity of the delimited and undemarcated area.

== First encounters ==
With the coming of the new year, crisis loomed in the Cenepa valley. By 8 January the Peruvian Army had deployed four patrols near Base Sur. On the night of 9 January 1995, Ecuadorian troops found and captured four Peruvian soldiers that according to the Ecuadorian accounts were supposedly reconnoitering the approaches to the Ecuadorian outpost of Cueva de los Tayos. Following the customary regulations put in place by both armies for the handling of such instances, the so-called Cartillas de Seguridad y Confianza (Guidelines for Safety and Mutual Confidence), the captured Peruvian personnel were delivered to their own officers without further incident.

Always following the Ecuadorian accounts, a subsequent incident took place two days later, on January 11, when another Peruvian patrol was detected near a place called the "Y", a point of tactical importance in the Ecuadorian lines. Shots were fired, apparently causing no casualties on either side.

== Open war ==
By the third week of January, the Peruvian high command had deployed to the Cenepa area what it considered to be enough troops to clear any and all Ecuadorian troops on the Eastern side of the Cordillera del Cóndor. In retrospect, it is likely that Lima was expecting a repetition of the 1981 incident, unaware of the scale of the Ecuadorian deployment. Thus, as a preliminary to the attack, on 21 January Peruvian helicopters began a series of reconnaissance and troop insertion flights on the rear of the Ecuadorian positions, which continued for the next two days. The next day, 22 January, the Ecuadorians detected around twenty Peruvian troops setting up a heliport to the north and rear of the Ecuadorian forward outposts.

The stepping up of the Peruvian air operations, combined with the surprise discovery of a Peruvian base on the rear of the Ecuadorian perimeter, compelled the Ecuadorian high command to take the initiative. That same day, a reinforced Special Forces company was ordered to advance undetected through the dense jungle and dislodge the Peruvians from the site, named by the Ecuadorians' "Base Norte". Significantly, the decision to act was made by the Commander-in-Chief of the Army before informing the President of the Republic, Sixto Durán-Ballén, and his National Security Council.

The Ecuadorian high command had by then interpreted the opinion of the Commander in Chief of the Peruvian armed forces, General Nicolás de Bari Hermoza, to respond to calls from his Ecuadorian counterpart as a signal that the Peruvian military, with or without the knowledge of Peruvian President Alberto Fujimori, was preparing a military operation in the Cenepa valley.

The next day, the decision to act already taken, the Ecuadorian local commander informed his Peruvian counterpart that, from 24 January onwards, any Peruvian helicopter flying over Ecuadorian positions would be shot down. On the morning of Thursday, 26 January 1995, after three days of march, the Ecuadorian Special Forces detachment arrived undetected at the small Peruvian outpost "Base Norte" and launched a surprise attack on the unsuspecting garrison. A fierce firefight ensued, but the Peruvians were eventually forced to disperse through the jungle, leaving behind a number of dead soldiers, as well as weapons and supplies. The Cenepa War had begun.

But it was the Peruvian troops that finally evicted the Ecuadorian troops from their territory after the intense bombardment by land and air of the bases of the Cave of the Tayos, the South Base and the false Tiwinza.

=== Chronology of the War ===
The following days, the events unfolded in quick succession. Below is a complete chronological summary of the war.

- 24 January: Peru mobilizes troops towards Tiwinza, Ecuador engages in preparing the FAE (Ecuadorian Air Force), Ecuadorian fighter jets.
- 25 January: Peru militarizes a site in the Condor strip later known as Base Sur, thus provoking reaction by Ecuadorian forces, initiating the war.
- 26 January: Peruvian conscripts setting up a heliport in Quebrada Fashin, behind the Ecuadorian outposts built in Peru's land since 1994, are attacked by Ecuadorian Special Forces, dislodging the Peruvians from the site; the Ecuadorians name the place Base Norte. Thus begins the shooting war.
- 27 January: Ecuador and Peru order general mobilization. Armored units are deployed to the Pacific coast border area, ready to act in case of a general war. Altogether, around 140,000 men were mobilized during the war.
- 28 January: At 7:45, the Peruvians launch the first ground assault against the Ecuadorian positions in the Cenepa headwaters. The attack is renewed at 11:05, this time with helicopters providing suppressive fire. At 09:00 a Peruvian Air Force (FAP) Bell 212 helicopter was damaged in its fuel tank by Ecuadorian fire. At 12:05, Peruvian ground attack aircraft make their first appearance over the valley, but withdraw upon being informed of the presence of FAE interceptors in the area.
- 29 January: In a pattern that will continue during the next days, Peruvian forces launch multiple and simultaneous attacks all over the area, in an effort to off-balance the Ecuadorian defenses. The Ecuadorians fight back at Tiwinza, Cueva de los Tayos, Base Sur, and Coangos, and shoot down a Soviet-made Mi-8TV helicopter (EP-587) belonging to the Peruvian Army Aviation (AEP) becomes the first confirmed kill for the Ecuadorian MANPADS teams on the ground. At the end of the day, Peru announces having captured three Ecuadorian strongholds as a result of the day's actions, which Ecuador goes on to deny.
- 31 January: After a 24-hours lull in the fight, the Peruvians resume their attacks against Tiwinza, Coangos, and Cueva de los Tayos. Ecuador and Peru reject an international appeal for an immediate ceasefire.
- 1 February: The assaults continue, now with strong artillery support. Peruvian A-37B ground attack aircraft appear over the battlefield and bomb Ecuadorian positions. The Ecuadorian base of Cóndor Mirador, on the summit of the Cordillera del Cóndor falls also under attack. A Peruvian patrol approaching Cueva de los Tayos hits a minefield and suffers severe losses.
- 2 February: During the day, the FAP carries out no less than twelve ground attack sorties, in support of the ground troops assaulting Cueva de los Tayos and Base Sur. FAE interceptors, still flying from bases too far north, near Guayaquil, appear too late to find any targets.
- 3 February: Ecuadorian Strikemasters and A-37B ground attack aircraft appear for the first time to bomb Peruvian positions.
- 4 February: Peruvian Tucanos bomb Ecuadorian positions in the valley during a night bombing sortie.
- 6 February: The FAP begins to make use of its Canberra jet bombers to strike Ecuadorian positions. One Canberra is lost perhaps crashed into a mountain due to the bad weather conditions over the area.
- 7 February: In a bitter reminder of the dangers that the Cenepa valley pose for low-speed aircraft flying at low-altitudes, a FAP Mi-25 helicopter gunship is downed after being hit in quick succession by at least two (probably three) SA-16s shoulder-fired missiles. FAE A-37Bs, escorted by Kfir fighters, continue to attack Peruvian positions. One A-37B is hit by Peruvian AA fire, but manages to get back to base.
- 9 February: Heavy air activity. The FAP carries out no less than 16 ground attack sorties, throwing its fleet of Sukhoi Su-22 fighter-bombers into the battle. FAP Canberras carry out a night bombing mission.

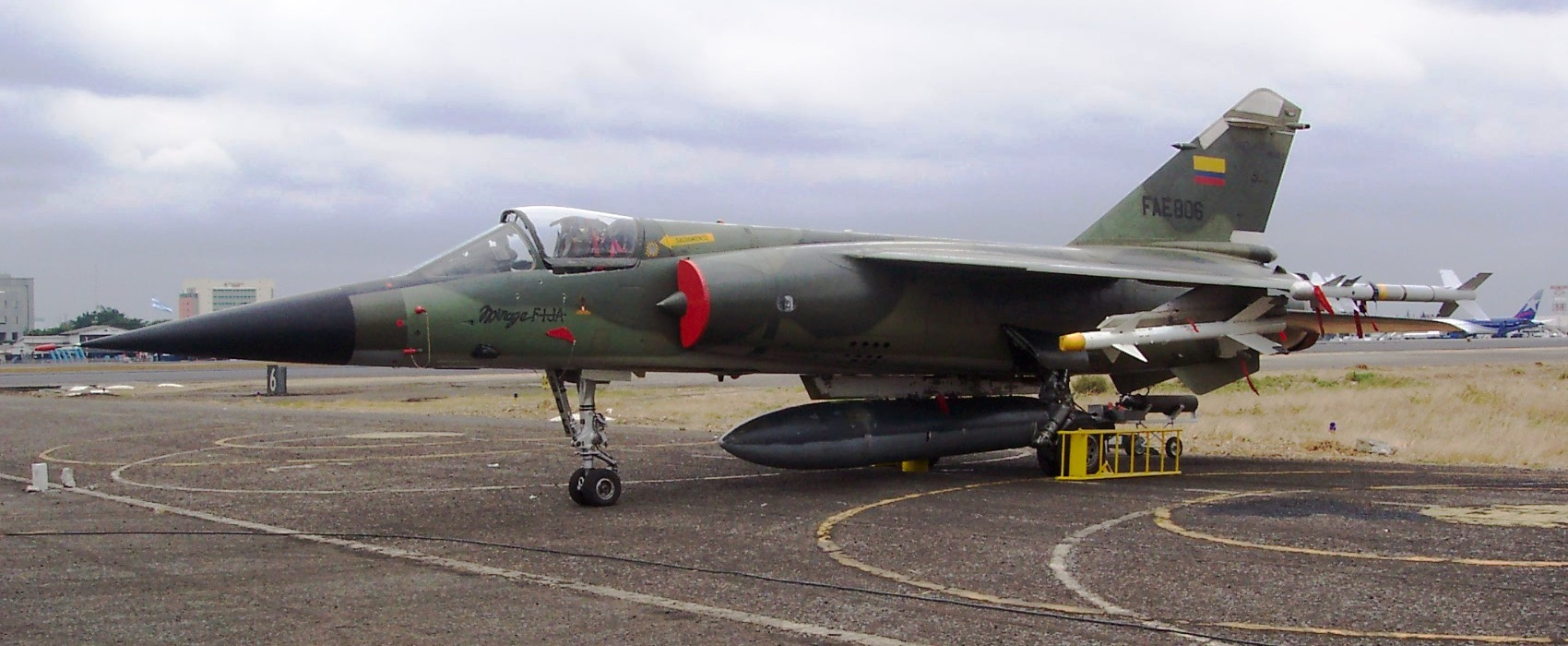
The Mirage F.1JA (FAE-806) was one of aircraft supposedly involved in the claimed shoot down of two Peruvian Sukhoi Su-22 on 10 February 1995.

- 10 February: Heavy air activity continues over the battlezone. During the morning, the FAP sends in A-37Bs and Sukhoi Su-22 to strike Ecuadorian positions. The FAE steps in. At 12:42, the Ecuadorian radars pick up five enemy targets approaching for another round of attacks. Two FAE Mirage F.1JAs and two IAI Kfir C.2s are sent to intercept the incoming aircraft. In the ensuing action an A-37B subsonic aircraft is shot down by a Kfir and two Peruvian Sukhoi Su-22s were claimed to be shot down by the Ecuadorian Mirage F1 respectively. Peru, however, denied that the two Sukhoi Su-22s were shot down by Mirages, stating that one was struck by Ecuadorian anti-aircraft artillery during a low-flying ground-attack mission, and the second because of an engine fire. Regarding the two downed Su-22s, the Ecuadorian Air Force never showed the HUD videos of the Ecuadorian fighters shooting down the Su-22s.
- 11 February: Further Peruvian Special Forces reinforcements arrive at PV-1. As the ground war drags on, air activity over the area increases. Encouraged by the events of the day before, the Ecuadorian A-37Bs launch even bolder ground-attack missions on Peruvian positions. One FAE A-37B is hit by a Peruvian MANPADS.
- 12 February: Air operations continue. The Peruvians claim the destruction of one A-37B and one Kfir, both of them denied by Ecuador.
- 13 February: Peruvian forces launch powerful attacks against Coangos and Tiwinza, with heavy air support. One Peruvian Mi-8TV is lost to Ecuadorian fire. In the evening, Peruvian President Alberto Fujimori appears before the cameras to claim the taking of Tiwinza (Tiwinza "I" Cota 1209) and total victory for Peru. However the Ecuadorians denied this claim by "showing the position of Tiwinza" by GPS, but their coordinates were false.
- 14–16 February: Combat continues all along the area.
- 17 February: In the presence of the four guarantor countries of the Rio Protocol (the US, Brazil, Chile, Argentina), Ecuadorian Vice-Minister of Foreign Affairs, Marcelo Fernández de Córdoba, and Peruvian Vice-Minister of Foreign Affairs, Eduardo Ponce, sign a peace declaration in Brazil (Declaración de Paz de Itamaraty), confirming a ceasefire, a separation of forces, a general demobilization, and establishing a "guarantors" peacekeeping force, the MOMEP (Military Observer Mission, Ecuador Peru), charged with supervising the separation of forces, taking over the posts of Tiwinza and Base Sur, and suggesting the limits for an eventual demilitarized zone. Ecuador and Peru pledge themselves to begin talks on the "pending issues".
- 21 February: The first MOMEP observers arrive to the Ecuadorian rear base of Patuca, but confused fighting rages on all-day long, preventing the observers to reach the area of the conflict. Ecuador claims Peruvian helicopters are violating the cease-fire by flying over the Ecuadorian posts.
- 22 February: In a day that Ecuadorians refer to as "Black Wednesday", Peruvian forces launch a strong attack on Ecuadorian positions in Cenepa valley (Tiwinza Cota 1061). According to Ecuadorian sources, fourteen of their soldiers died that day, the worst in terms of casualties for the Ecuadorian Army during the war. That afternoon and night, the Ecuadorian forces retaliate against Peruvians positions until the next day, when intense activity was detected in the Peruvian lines, identified by the Ecuadorian officers as the evacuation of the casualties caused by the offensive the night before.
- 28 February: After more days of confusing skirmishes, Ecuador and Peru sign the Montevideo Declaration, "reiterating their commitment to proceed to an immediate and effective ceasefire". Although minor incidents would continue all over the area during the next months, the Cenepa War is officially over.

== Aftermath ==
- Negotiated ceasefire and withdrawal of troops from the combat zone.
- The conflict ends on March 28, 1995, with the signing of "Reiteration of the commitment to stop an immediate and effective ceasefire", after the guarantor countries established a demilitarized zone.
- Ecuadorian troops were forced to withdraw to the western side of the Cordillera del Cóndor as well as the entire head of the Cenepa River without having achieved their objective of obtaining the disputed territory and having sovereign access to the Amazon to compel Peru to a new delimitation in its borders. The posts installed by Ecuador came to be controlled by the Peruvian Army
- Ecuador recognizes the authenticity and validity of the Rio Protocol and renounces its thesis of unenforceability of the 1942 Rio de Janeiro Protocol and its aspiration to be a coastal country of the Amazon River as well as its claim of sovereignty over the Marañón river.
- The disputed territories are recognized as Peruvian. Tiwinza (cota 1061) was recognized by the guarantors as Peruvian territory.
- Ecuador receives 1 km^{2} in Tiwinza (level 1061) as "private property", without sovereignty and only for commemorative and non-military acts. Anyone born in Tiwinza (20 km²) will be considered Peruvian (Cenepa. Hoy 17 de Febrero de 1995 culmina la Guerra del Cenepa — Español)
- Brasilia Presidential Act signed on the 26 October 1998, closing the frontier, as stated in Protocolo de Rio de Janeiro, and declaring the end to all differences between the two nations.

By the beginning of March 1995, the MOMEP observers had entered the area and began to supervise the separation of forces. In accordance with the Treaty of Itamaraty and the Declaration of Montevideo, the Ecuadorians began to withdraw all their units to the base of Coangos, while the Peruvians were to do the same to PV-1. From there, troops would be extracted according to a schedule implement by the MOMEP. All combatants were withdrawn from the delimited and undemarcated area by May 5, 1995. A demilitarized zone came into effect on August 4 of the same year. Ecuador and Peru went on to negotiate the final demarcation of the border, in a lengthy process marked by one crisis after another, with a total war almost erupting in August 1998. Finally, on October 26, 1998, in Brasília, Jamil Mahuad, President of Ecuador, and Alberto Fujimori, President of Peru, along with the Presidents of Brazil, Argentina, and Chile; and a personal representative of the President of the United States of America, signed a Presidential Act, which proclaimed "the definitive resolution of the border disputes between the two nations".

In a decision that certain political sectors on both sides took as a setback, the Guarantors of the Rio Protocol determined that the boundary of the delimited and undemarcated zone was in fact the Cordillera del Cóndor line, as Peru had been claiming from the 1940s. While Ecuador was forced to renounce its decades-old territorial claims as Tumbes, Jaen and Maynas as well as on the eastern slopes of the Cordillera, as well as the entire western area of the Cenepa headwaters, Peru "gives" to Ecuador, as a "private property" but without sovereignty and only for commemorative and non-military events, one square kilometer of its territory, in the area where the Ecuadorian base of Tiwinza was located (level 1061), focal point of the war, inside the Peruvian soil, anyone born in Tiwinza will be considered Peruvian. The final demarcation of the border came into effect on May 13, 1999.

=== Casualties and material losses ===
Figures given for losses during the Cenepa War vary widely, especially regarding human casualties. Ecuadorian military sources put the casualties at 34 killed recognized by Comando Conjunto de las FFAA del Ecuador and 154 killed and wounded recognized by Asociación de ex combatientes del Cenepa, Quito, Ecuador. As of February 2005, an Ecuadorian Cenepa war veterans' association had a membership of 131 ex-combatants, some of them with long-term health disorders caused by the war. ALDHU, a human rights NGO, has put the total number of mortal casualties for both sides at around 500. This figure was also given by Ecuadorian senior officers after the war, reflecting the fact that Peruvians found themselves attacking well-protected Ecuadorian positions and subjected to continuous ambushes and well-aimed artillery and rocket fire from the heights of the Condor range.

The aircraft and helicopter losses mentioned above represent the losses acknowledged by each side during the conflict due to enemy action or to accidents, as cited in the Air Combat Information Group Website. According to the same source, Peru may have lost up to three helicopters during the conflict, and Ecuador may have lost one attack helicopter in unclear circumstances. Faundes, citing Ecuadorian sources, puts the total of Peruvian losses at four fixed-wing aircraft and three helicopters. Both sources agree that Ecuador lost one AT-33A trainer in an accident outside the combat area, three fallen A-37 and two defective Kfir cannot return to the theater of operations in the conflict.

=== Illegal armament sale controversy ===
==== Chile ====
During the war, a series of Peruvian newspapers brought forth information claiming that Chile had sold armament to Ecuador during the conflict. This claim was promptly denied by Chile the following day on February 5, 1995, but admitted that they had sold weaponry to Ecuador on September 12, 1994, as part of a regular commercial exchange that had no aim against any particular nation. The source of this deal has been traced back to 1977, when the military regime of Augusto Pinochet signed an agreement with the Ecuadorian military authorities then ruling the country (headed by Alfredo Poveda) for the sale of armament by the state-run FAMAE factory. That contract was reportedly renewed around the reported time of the registered legal sale (September 1994), which led to the aforementioned shipment of military hardware to Ecuador. In 1995, and due to lack of further information, Peru's president, Alberto Fujimori, put a momentary end to the scandal.

However, the controversy was once again ignited when General Víctor Manuel Bayas, former Chief of Staff of the Ecuadorian Armed Forces during the Cenepa War, made a series of declarations in regards to the armed conflict between Peru and Ecuador. On March 21, 2005, General Bayas was asked by the Ecuadorian newspaper El Comercio if Chile had sold armaments to Ecuador during the Cenepa War, to which he replied: “Yes, it was a contract with the militaries during the conflict." Furthermore, General Bayas revealed that Argentina and Russia had also sold weaponry to Ecuador during the conflict. Later that same year, on April 11, Colonel Ernesto Checa, Ecuador's military representative in Chile during the Cenepa War, stated that Chile provided Ecuador with "ammunition, rifles and night vision devices" during the war. Moreover, the Peruvian government revealed that it held knowledge that during the war at least a couple of Ecuadorian C-130 transport airplanes had landed in Chilean territory to pick up 9mm ammunition, and that the Ecuadorian Air Force had planned three more of those armament acquisition voyages to Chile. Nonetheless, the Peruvian government at that time regarded this as a minor incident due to the Chilean Sub-secretary of Foreign Relations, Mariano Fernández, telling the Peruvian ambassador in Chile, Alfonso de Rivero, on February 2, 1995, that the Chilean government would take immediate measures to stop any other possible operations of this nature. In this communication, Fernández is reported to have concurred to de Rivero's residence and revealed that only 9mm ammunition, which had been paid with anticipation, had been loaded in the Ecuadorian planes; that a Chilean lawyer representing Ecuador had demanded the fulfillment of the contract and that Ecuadorian military personnel who came on the plane asked for additional armament, only to have this petition denied; however Peruvian Caretas magazine reported that part of this information wasn't precise (without specifying which part). Apparently, the Chilean authorities were being sincere, as President Frei only took notice of the departure of the Ecuadorian Hercules planes (loaded only with ammunition) hours after they had left.

Chile's response to the declarations made by General Bayas were made the following day on March 22, 2005. The government of Chile denied the claims and stated that the only registered sale of weapons to Ecuador was in 1994. Jaime Ravinet, the Chilean Minister of Defense, assured that any other armament transfer after the 1994 date had been illegal. Ravinet further stated that, after discussing the matter with his Peruvian counterpart, Roberto Chiabra, the situation had been resolved. Yet, the Peruvian government did not find the February 5, 1995, and March 22, 2005, declarations as acceptable or sufficient; and went on to send a note of protest to the Chilean government. Peru further claimed that Chile should have maintained absolute neutrality and that this alleged weapons commerce during the Cenepa War went against resolutions made by the United Nations and the Organization of American States.

In the end, the whole operation was revealed to be the planning of former dictator Pinochet, then chief of the Armed Forces (until 1998). Quoting Peruvian ambassador to Chile in 1995 (de Rivero), the Chilean Sub-secretary (Fernández) "pointed out to me that President Frei and chancellor (foreign minister) Insulza had been deeply worried by the situation and that they were taking all the dispositions of the case to reform the military sales law". Reportedly, Pinochet himself later assumed direct responsibility for the shipment before the civilian authorities of his country (even if his lawyer denied it in 2005), as he still exercised considerable influence over state institutions and controlled the security apparatus, thus having power to bypass civilian controls to foreign arms sales. It is worth noting that Pinochet, who had lived in Ecuador during the second half of the 1950s as a military instructor, had a deep affection towards the country and, a couple of years later, in November–December 1997, made a controversial and highly publicized visit to Ecuador where he attended a series of ceremonies and was given six military and civilian decorations by that country's civilian and military authorities.

==== Argentina ====
Argentina admitted to the illegal sale of armament by revealing the existence of three secret decrees signed by President Carlos Menem between the years of 1991 and 1995. The controversy regarding the decrees came about when the weapons sold did not go to Panama, Bolivia, and Venezuela as had been accorded, but instead the weapons ended up in Croatia and Ecuador at times when both of these nations were involved in wars and prohibited from receiving international military aid. The sale Argentina gave to Ecuador included 6.500 tons of rifles, cannons, anti-tank rockets, and ammunition. Menem was taken to court for his alleged association with these illegal acts in 2001, but was acquitted by Argentina's Supreme Court. In October 2008 the case was re-opened, but Menem avoided being detained by Argentine authorities until 2010 due to his position as senator of La Rioja. Menem claimed to have had no association with the illegal weapons trade, and further adds that this is a political persecution made by Argentine president Cristina Fernández and, her husband and also former Argentine president, Néstor Kirchner. In 2013 Carlos Menem was sentenced to seven years in prison for arms-smuggling.

== Characteristics of the fighting in 1995 ==
Several explanations have been brought forward to explain the outcome of the Cenepa conflict. Some of these can be briefly summarized here:

- Logistics. Both during the buildup of forces and during the clashes of January and February, the Peruvian Army found itself at a logistical disadvantage. The fact that all reinforcements and supplies had to be flown in by helicopter from Ciro Alegría base, more than 110 km to the south, meant that, in general, the Ecuadorian forces went into combat better armed and supplied. Moreover, once the shooting war started, the Cenepa valley became a rather dangerous place for the Peruvian Mil Mi-8 and Mil Mi-17 helicopters, which besides their transport duties also carried out ground-attack missions.
- Force Composition. Right from the very first clashes, the Ecuadorian Army committed Special Forces units all along the combat area. In addition to the paratroopers, the Ecuadorians sent into battle a number of "Iwia" detachments — units composed of tribal people such as the Shuar people, specialized in jungle combat and survival. Until the arrival of some elite counterinsurgency units from the south (battle-hardened by a leftist insurgency) the Peruvian forces committed to the battle were composed mostly of young and inexperienced conscripts.
- Terrain. In 1995, the Ecuadorian Army fought on terrain of its own choosing. From the heights of the Condor mountain range, the Ecuadorians had a commanding view of the entire combat area. The Ecuadorian artillery -carefully camouflaged on the reverse slopes of the Condor range- could deliver precise and deadly fire upon attacking Peruvian troops. By the same token, the Ecuadorian antiaircraft batteries and SAMs located on the heights made helicopter low-level flight into the valley a dangerous proposition.
- State of the opposing air forces at the outbreak of the crisis. The war of 1995 came at a bad moment for the Peruvian Air Force, as the economic crisis that had struck the nation in the 1980s had a negative impact on the readiness of the FAP. At the beginning of January 1995, with a crisis looming on the horizon, the FAP found itself in no shape for a major air war. Most of its fleet of modern Mirage 2000Ps interceptors, bought in the mid-1980s and the backbone of the FAP, was grounded for lack of spare parts and proper maintenance due to lack of funds. Only three Mirage 2000Ps were immediately available for active operations. Its fleet of Sukhoi Su-22 fighter-bombers was in the same situation, with some seven aircraft in flying condition; the lack of preparedness even affected the Cessna A-37B subsonic counterinsurgency and ground-attack aircraft. Although by the end of January the situation regarding operational aircraft had greatly improved, the crisis had probably left its impact on the FAP. Ecuador had also passed through a period of economic crisis of its own, but the FAE had kept in operational status a sizeable part of its fleet of Mirage F.1JAs, IAI Kfir C.2s, and SEPECAT Jaguars, with perhaps some ten Mirages, ten Kfirs, and four or six Jaguars in serviceable condition. Thus, while smaller in total number of planes, the FAE of January 1995 felt qualitatively capable of facing the FAP on equal terms - in striking contrast to the situation during the crisis of 1981, where except for a small number of missions, the FAE had been kept on the ground armed and ready for immediate action, to be committed only in case of a full-fledged war. In 1995 their positions in the Cordillera del Cóndor were well defended due to tactically placed SAMs, and units armed with British-made Blowpipe missiles and Russian-made SA-16 MANPADS. Nevertheless, such defences didn't stop the continuous raids of the Peruvian Air Force.

== See also ==
- Ecuadorian–Peruvian War
- History of the Ecuadorian-Peruvian territorial dispute
- Paquisha Incident
- Post–World War II air-to-air combat losses
- Luis García Rojas
