= Rafael Hoyos Rubio =

Commander-in-chief of the Peruvian Army (1924–1981)

General Commander of the Peruvian Army
- In office December 5, 1980 – June 5, 1981
- President: Fernando Belaúnde
- Preceded by: Pedro Richter
- Succeeded by: Otto Eléspuru

Personal details
- Born: January 8, 1924 Cajamarca, Peru
- Died: June 5, 1981 (aged 57) Ecuador–Peru border
- Cause of death: Helicopter crash
- Resting place: El Ángel Cemetery
- Spouse: Nelly De Vinatea
- Children: 6
- Parent(s): Orestes Hoyos Rocha; Victoria Rubio Villacorta
- Education: Chorrillos Military School

Military service
- Allegiance: Peru
- Branch/service: Peruvian Army
- Years of service: 1942–1981
- Rank: Army general
- Commands: Peruvian Army
- Battles/wars: Paquisha War

Rafael Hoyos Rubio (1924–1981) was a Peruvian general who held the rank of General of the Army and occupied the post of Commander in Chief of the Peruvian Army from December 5, 1980 to June 1981.

== Early life and education ==
He was born in Cajamarca on January 8, 1924 and died at the Peru-Ecuador border in 1981.

Rafael was the son of Hoyos Rocha and Victoria Rubio Villacorta. He was married to Nelly De Vinatea, who bore him six children including Rafael (who also became General of the Army), Maria Victoria, Raúl, Luis, Nelly and Carmen.

Hoyos Rubio completed his primary and secondary education in the city of Cajamarca. In 1942 he joined the Army as a volunteer soldier and went on to study at the Escuela de Clases. In March 1944 he entered the Military School in Chorrillos, graduating as Sub Lieutenant of the Infantry with the 50th Promotion "Junín".

In 1955 he entered the War College. Afterwards he did Tactical advanced training courses at Fort Gulick Panama, and Advanced Infantry at Fort Benning, USA.

== Career ==
Throughout his career Hoyos Rubio served in various garrisons of the Republic, in addition he was an instructor at the Military School of Chorrillos and the School Infantry. Between 1966 and 1968 he served as military attache in Chile. As Brigadier General he was Head of the Special Forces Detachment and Commander of the Ninth Armored Division. During the government of General Juan Velasco Alvarado he served as Minister of Food. In 1978 already boasted the rank of General of Division, he served as Commanding General of the Academic Centres and State Major General of the Army in 1979. He was chairman of the Joint Command of the Armed Forces (1979–1980).

In 1981 he was Commander General of the Army and as such was responsible for the operations of the Cordillera del Condor, acting at the Paquisha point in the confrontation with Ecuador.

== Recognition ==
In June 1981, while undertaking a Command visit, General Hoyos Rubio was killed in a helicopter crash. Ten other people died in the crash, including Alfredo Maúrtua Landázuri (major and pilot), Américo Sánchez Aguado (lieutenant and co-pilot), Luis Montoya Montoya (general and chief of the army's first region), Felix Chalcatana Guerrero, Ulises Mantilla Vera, Augusto Fernández Roy (colonels), Jorge Mori Briceno, Walter Aguilar Santillán, Mario Quevedo Quevedo (sub-officers) and Elmer Gómez Ortiz (army photographer; civilian).

Today, in the city of Cajamarca, an avenue is named after him. Rubio, who had been one of the conspirators in the de Velasco coup, implored officials to never again stop aspiring towards saving the country. Of these pronouncements, Hoyos said the country itself is not saved and is violated by the military unit.

In 2007 the "Major General Rafael Hoyos Rubio" Military College was founded in the city of Cajamarca.

=== Awards ===
- Military Order of Ayacucho in the degree of "Knight".
- Peruvian Military Merit Cross in the rank of officer.
- Order of May at the rank of Commander granted by the Argentine government.
- Grand Cross of the Order of Military Merit from the Spanish
