= Tiwintza detachment =

Coordinates: 3.4723°S 78.2522°W

The Tiwintza detachment (also known as the Tiwinza detachment ) is an Ecuadorian military outpost that was involved in the Cenepa War between Ecuador and Peru in 1995. The post had been a focal point of the war over disputed border claims; the settlement of the war resulted in the post remaining Peruvian, but with its “non-sovereign ownership” transferred to Ecuador, allowing it to fly the Ecuadorian flag.
