= Paquisha Canton =

- Canton
- Flag

- Location of Zamora Chinchipe Province in Ecuador.

- Cantons of Zamora Chinchipe Province
- Coordinates: 3.93275°S 78.67426°W
- Country: Ecuador
- Province: Zamora-Chinchipe Province

Population (2022)
  - Total: 4,737
- Time zone: UTC-5 (ECT)

Paquisha Canton is a canton of Ecuador, located in the Zamora-Chinchipe Province. Its capital is the town of Paquisha.
