= Richelieu Levoyer =

Ecuadorian army general and politician

Richelieu Levoyer Artieda
- Born: June 17, 1930; Quito, Ecuador
- Died: December 21, 2015 (aged 85) Quito, Ecuador
- Allegiance: Ecuador
- Branch: Ecuadorian Army artillery
- Service years: 1946–1982
- Rank: Divisional General
- Commands: First Division of the Army of Ecuador
- Conflicts: Paquisha War

Richelieu Levoyer Artieda (June 17, 1930 – December 21, 2015) was an Ecuadorian Army general and politician. He was the son of painter Jorge Levoyer and educator Delia Maria Artieda.

== Early life ==
General Levoyer was the Southern Front Commander during the Paquisha War. He later served as Government Minister where he deployed a systematic plan for the destruction of prisons where human rights were being violated. He also proposed the "Return to the Constitution Plan" that ended the 1976–1979 dictatorship. He served as Professor and then Director of the centers of Ecuadorian military studies. He became Director of the School for Improvement of the Ecuadorian Army. He led the creation of the "National Institute of Advanced Studies." He served as Sub-Secretary of Industries focused on developing such productive activity, handmade crafts and tourism.

=== Military education ===
He studied at the "Eloy Alfaro" Military School. Then he went to specialized courses in the School of the Americas, Panama. He attended the "Staff Study Centre" of the Brazilian Army. He enrolled at the Inter-American Defense College in the United States. He attended the Ecuadorian War Academy and then became its director.

== Career ==
=== Military leader ===
General Levoyer was the Southern Front Commander during the Paquisha War between Ecuador and Peru in 1981, where he led 25,000 soldiers. César Augusto Alarcón Costta described his role in the war, saying:

"He displayed an intense work in defense of territorial integrity and sovereignty of Ecuador in the Amazonia compared with the surrender of whom on October 26, 1998 subjected our country to the Peruvian claims imposed by force through the null Rio de Janeiro Protocol of January 29, 1942."

=== Political career ===
As Government Minister (1976), General Levoyer organized a political dialogue bringing together popular organizations and new political tendencies. As a result, indigenous people for the first time entered the Palacio de Carondelet, not to pick up the ashes of cigarettes that left behind the so-called leaders of Ecuador, but to decide the Nation's future, indigenous peoples who later formed their own organization known as CONAIE and its political expression, the "Pachakutik political Party" that in XXI century evolved to become the Pachakutik Plurinational Unity Movement – New Country.

As a result of the dialogue, General Levoyer announced the "State Law Restructuring Plan". First, Ecuadorian people would choose a Constitution: the old 1945 Constitution (although, reformed) or a new one. The new constitution was passed in 1978. Either ways the indigenous peoples, for the first time in Ecuador's History could vote, be nominated and run to be elected to any office. Besides, it had been promulgated an Electoral Law and other on Political Parties.

The Ecuadorian right wing sought to have General Levoyer removed from office. They lacked the power to oust him from the military and instead pushed to have him assigned as Military Attache at the Ecuadorian Embassy to the United States, during the Presidency of Jimmy Carter.

=== Legislator ===
General Levoyer ran and was elected to the highest rank at the National Congress (Ecuador's Legislature at that time) as a National Deputy for the 1984–1988 period. He became the driving force behind the Ecuadorian presence in Antarctica and created the Ecuadorian Antarctic Program. He also led the passage of two laws honoring the soldiers of the 1941 and 1981 wars.

=== Americas ===
He served as President of OMIDELAC (Organization of Military for the Democracy, the Integration and the Liberation of Latin America and the Caribbean). This organization played an important role in promoting democratic systems in Latin America and, in doing so, developed open and public activities such as to oppose to the Military dictatorship of Chile (1973–1990). OMIDELAC was invited as an election observer in several Latin American countries.

General Levoyer was a member and later President of FEGES (Fundación "Eloy Alfaro" de Estudios Geopolíticos y Estratégicos).

Finally, General Levoyer served as Judge in the Military Court of Ecuador.

=== Philosophy ===
He said, "If you want to make a major change in the country, power must be obtained, but not getting it for itself −what would be simple egotism and ambition−, but to change things, and once installed there, and with the support of a unpolluted reputation earned day by day, then, and only then, take on any real and profound change that will be possible with the support of public consensus, with which we will have an undoubted success and beneficial to the poorest of our country."

== See also ==
- Politics of Ecuador
