= Paquisha War =

1981 war between Ecuador and Peru

Paquisha incident
- Part of the Ecuadorian–Peruvian conflicts
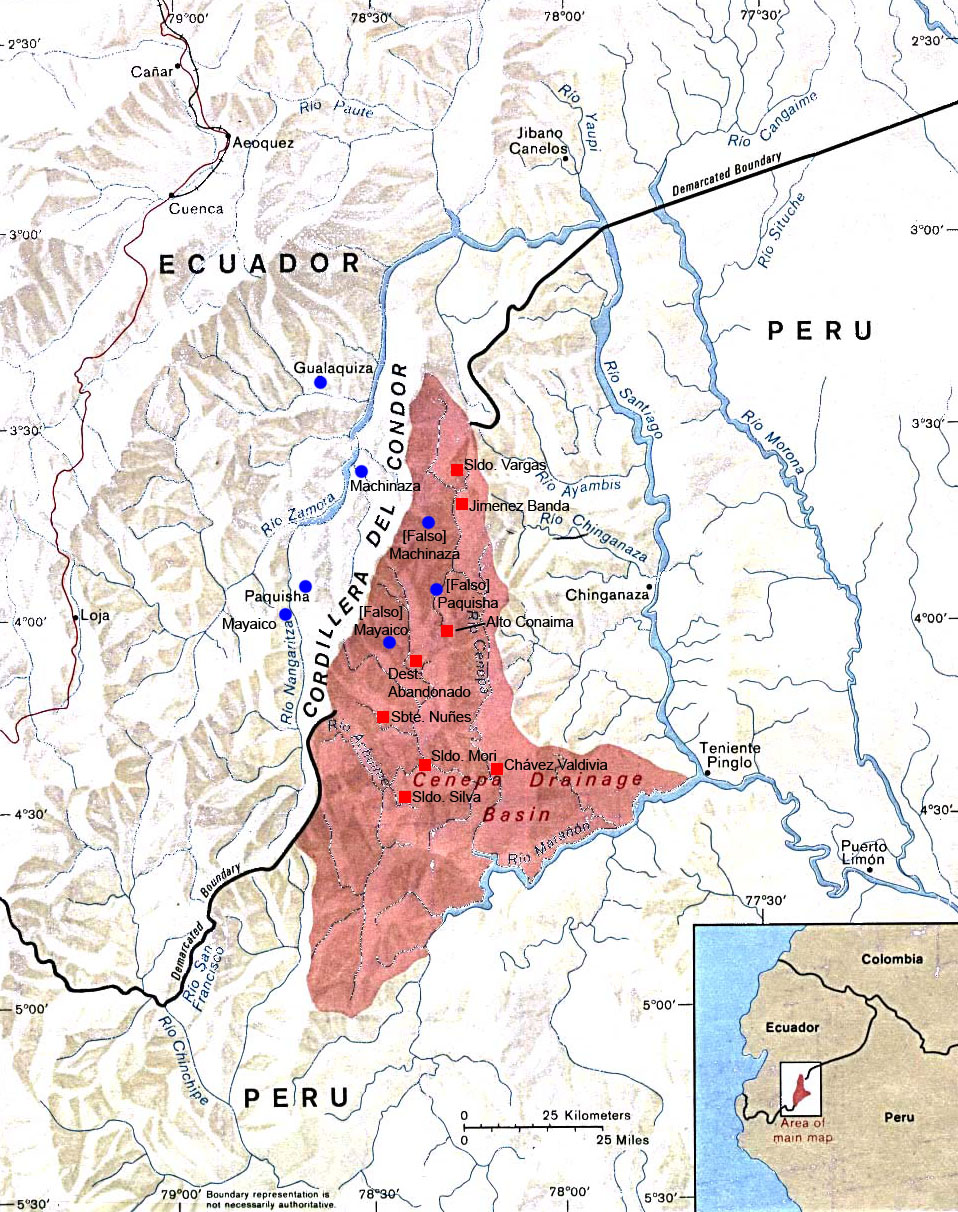
- Location of the Peruvian and Ecuadorian posts during the False Paquisha or Alto Comaina conflict
Date	22 January – 21 February 1981
Location	Condor mountain range
Result	Peruvian victory
Territorial changes	The posts installed by the Ecuadorians came to be controlled by the Peruvian Army

Belligerents
Peru	Ecuador

Commanders and leaders
Fernando Belaúnde Terry; Rafael Hoyos Rubio	Jaime Roldós Aguilera

Strength
60 men	190 men

Casualties and losses
17 killed 1 helicopter destroyed	46 killed & wounded

The Paquisha War, Fake Paquisha War or Paquisha incident (Spanish: Guerra de Paquisha, Conflicto del Falso Paquisha o Incidente de Paquisha) was a military clash that took place between January and February 1981 between Ecuador and Peru over the control of three watchposts. While Peru felt that the matter was already decided in the Ecuadorian–Peruvian War of 1941, Ecuador claimed that the Rio de Janeiro Protocol was not executable because a 78 km section of the border was not precisely defined.

In the aftermath of the incident, both sides increased their military presence along the Cordillera del Cóndor area and Cenepa Valley, starting an escalating spiral of tension and provocation that finally resulted in another military confrontation in 1995, the Cenepa War.

While the name Paquisha War is widely used by the international community and Ecuador, in Spanish this incident is also known as the Falso Paquisha War (Conflicto del Falso Paquisha) in Peru and, occasionally, as the Paquisha Incident or the Upper Comaina Conflict (conflicto del Alto Comaina).

== Historical background ==
For details on the history of the border dispute between Ecuador and Peru, please see History of the Ecuadorian–Peruvian territorial dispute.

=== The Paquisha or "False Paquisha" Incident ===
The conflict began on January 22, 1981, the day on which the Peruvian government denounced the attack on one of its aircraft that was carrying out a supply mission destined for border surveillance posts on the Comaina River. Peruvian President Fernando Belaúnde Terry ordered the inspection of the river until its source located on the eastern side of the Condor range (in Spanish, Cordillera del Cóndor). In this inspection, three Ecuadorian detachments were found with facilities in the territory considered to be Peru by the Peruvian Government according to the previous treaties. These detachments had captured the old observation posts Nos. 22, 3 and 4.

The Ecuadorian position indicated that these detachments corresponded to the "Paquisha" base established in Ecuadorian territory. But, after measuring the coordinates, it was found that they did not correspond to the aforementioned Paquisha accepted in the Rio de Janeiro Protocol but, as Peruvian President Fernando Belaúnde described it, to a "False Paquisha", a name he gave it to be able to easily distinguish it from the first Paquisha that was legal under the Rio Protocol of 1942.

The establishment of these posts was considered by the Peruvian Government as a violation of a status quo line arranged between the military leaders of both countries in the course of several meetings at the end of the 1970s. During these agreements both sides would have agreed not to establish any new military posts in the disputed areas, which would have meant for Ecuador not to establish any military presence to the east of the ridgeline of the Condor Range.

The Ecuadorian possession of these posts was denounced by Peruvian representatives at the foreign ministers' meeting of the OAS, on February 2, 1981. During this meeting, the Peruvian Foreign Minister, Javier Arias Stella, called the three Ecuadorian military outposts falsos ("fakes"), despite Ecuadorian sovereignty.

The Ecuadorian Foreign Minister, Alfonso Barrera Valverde, responded to this allegation stating that when Ecuador responded to the attacks on January 22, it always specified that the attacks were being made against the destacamentos (military outposts) of Paquisha, Mayaicu, and Machinaza, not against the similarly named Ecuadorian towns.

The Peru prepared a contingent to recover the post, formed mainly by Mi-8TV transport helicopters of the Army Aviation and Air Group No. 3, formed by FAP A-37, Su-22 and Mirage 5 aircraft to support to the Jungle Infantry.

The Fuerza Aérea del Peru (FAP) flew many sorties with A-37B, Mirage 5P and Su-22 to support these operations. The FAE flew 179 combat missions with A-37B and Mirage F1 aircraft to counter the FAP attacks. On January 28, 1981, there was a dogfight between 2 A-37Bs of the FAE and FAP.

On January 30, Peruvian troops recovered the "PV-22" (False Paquisha), the next day they recovered the "PV-3", and on February 1, they recovered the "PV-4" (New ) or "false Mayaico".

By that day, the conflict was apparently over but then Peruvians discovered that more troops from Ecuador had settled in 3 other military posts and 3 points on the northeastern border of the Cordillera del Cóndor and were the "PV El Mirador" posts, "PV-4-A" and "PV-4-B" (Old).

On February 19, Peruvians recovered the "PV Jiménez Banda 2" (False Machinaza) and the next day, February 20, the "PV-4-A" and "PV-4-B" (Old ).

On February 21, the Aviation of the Peruvian Army destroyed the last military installations of the Army of Ecuador that were still in the Peruvian territory.

The Peruvian operation was a success, the outpost of Falso Paquisha, that was occupied by the Ecuadorians, was taken on February 5 by Peruvian troops. The conflict, which occurred in a then non-demarcated area of the common border between Ecuador and Peru, ceased with the Ecuadorians being expelled from the slopes and driven back to the summit of the Cordillera del Cóndor.

The Organization of American States (OAS), had to intervene through the Sorrosa-Du Bois Act, setting the location coordinates allowed for border troops, ratifying the condition of the mentioned mountain range as a natural boundary between the two countries.

According to a Peruvian journalistic information, which shows a photo that shows the capture of a powerful machine gun system with 4 guns of .50 (12.7 mm) caliber in “False Paquisha”, the installation of this type of armament represented the symbol of the gravity of the premeditated Ecuadorian invasion in Peruvian territory, through the Cordillera del Cóndor. According to Peruvian sources, only a detachment of high strategic value justifies the installation of a weapon of these characteristics. Known versions after the eviction of the Ecuadorian troops, between January 28 and February 1, 1981, confirm that this frustrated occupation was planned since 1977, when the first clashes between border patrols began to occur. Another second machine gun of the same characteristics would be captured by Peruvian soldiers in the "False Machinaza" Post (named by the Peruvians "Jiménez Banda 2") which was another of the positions invaded by Ecuadorians.

As a result, the Peruvian and Ecuadorian governments, with assistance of each one of the Guarantors, agreed to separate their forces. This "gentleman's agreement" remained in effect throughout the 1980s, with various measures taken to codify conduct of patrols encountering one another in the disputed area.

The meeting concluded with a resolution that announced a cease fire in the conflict zone, and noted that both countries had accepted a commission of representatives from the guarantor countries to safeguard the observance of the cease fire and establish conditions for peace between Peru and Ecuador.

=== Context of the "gentlemen's agreement" ===
To avoid the disaster of 1941 in regard to loss of civilian lives and a possible invasion to the south of Ecuador, the High Command sent twenty-five thousand men under the command of General Richelieu Levoyer with the task of defending possible invasion pathways.

Until then the Ecuadorian Defense Plan envisaged a logistics operations taking about eight days to set up defensive positions. Levoyer proposed a new plan which placed all personnel, weapons, supplies, etc., in twenty-four hours in the front and ready to fulfill the mission of defense.

The Peruvian armed forces were surprised by the rapid deployment of Ecuadorian forces, so, thinking that Levoyer and his men might invade the north of Peru, they organized anti-tank defense lines, trenches, and other defenses.

Fortunately, events did not lead to general war. The widespread confrontation was avoided probably because of the direct talks between top military commanders of the two countries, and the military delegates of Chile, Argentina, Brazil and USA. The talks took place in the border line near the Pacific Ocean, in the towns of Huaquillas (Ecuador, Province of El Oro) and Aguas Verdes (Peru, Department of Tumbes). The result was the Sorrosa-Du Bois Act.

=== Aftermath ===
Border violence remained constant until the resolution of the Ecuadorian–Peruvian territorial dispute in 1998 through the Brasilia Presidential Act. Violence occurred most of the time around January, which coincides with the month that the Rio Protocol was signed. Despite several proposals to complete demarcation of the border, no agreement was possible at that time.

Several military bases were built up and down the Cordillera by both countries, and the region was militarized. The Peruvian bases were serviced by helicopter, while on the Ecuadorian side, gravel roads were constructed to several military border posts.

According to the USIP, after this war, Ecuador's Foreign Ministry conducted a national opinion survey that reportedly confirmed the popularity of nullification of the Rio Protocol and Ecuador's right to sovereign access to the Amazon River. Thus, in 1983, the Ecuadorian congress reaffirmed its position on the nullity of the Rio Protocol.

In the book "Paquisha, all the truth" by the Ecuadorian writer Claudio Mena, said author maintains that the Ecuadorian president Jaime Roldós Aguilera had planned to inaugurate on February 12 those surveillance posts that Ecuador had installed in Peruvian territory to show the world that this territory was "Ecuadorian soil"

However, in 1998, Ecuador recognized the authenticity and validity of the Rio Protocol and renounced its thesis of inapplicability of the Rio de Janeiro Protocol of 1942 and its aspiration to be a riparian country of the Amazon River as well as its claim of sovereignty over it. The Marañón River through the Act of Brasilia, closing the border, as indicated in the Protocol of Rio de Janeiro, and declaring the end of all differences between the two nations

== See also ==
- Cenepa War
