= Rio Protocol =

1942 treaty between Ecuador and Peru

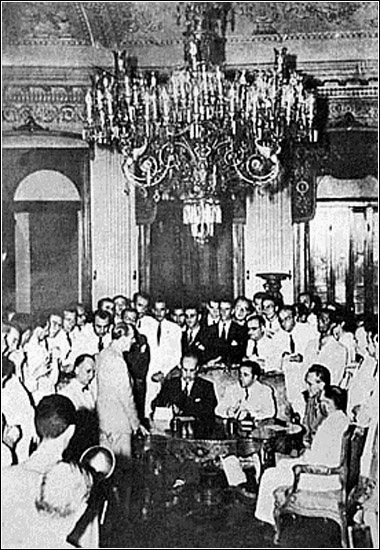
- The signing of the Rio Protocol
- Type: Bilateral treaty
- Signed: 29 January 1942
- Location: Rio de Janeiro city, Rio de Janeiro, Brazil
- Mediators: United States; Argentina; Brazil; Chile
- Original signatories: Ecuador; Peru
- Ratifiers: Ecuador; Peru

Full text
- es:Protocolo de Paz, Amistad y Límites de Río de Janeiro at Wikisource

The Protocol of Peace, Friendship, and Boundaries between Peru and Ecuador, or Rio Protocol for short, was an international agreement signed in Rio de Janeiro, Brazil, on January 29, 1942, by the foreign ministers of Peru and Ecuador, with the participation of the United States, Brazil, Chile, and Argentina as guarantors. The Protocol was intended to finally resolve the long-running territorial dispute between the two countries, and brought about the official end of the Ecuadorian–Peruvian War of 1941–1942. Nevertheless, the Protocol was incomplete, and war broke out between Peru and Ecuador twice more, in 1981 and in 1995, before the signing of the Itamaraty Peace Declaration which brought final resolution to the dispute.

== History ==
In May 1941, as tensions at the Ecuadorian-Peruvian border mounted and war was imminent, the governments of the United States, Brazil, and Argentina offered their services in aiding in the mediation of the dispute. Their efforts failed to prevent the outbreak of hostilities on July 23, 1941, but the diplomatic intervention led to a definitive cease-fire being put into place on July 31. Despite this, limited skirmishes continued to occur through the months of August and September in the Ecuadorian provinces of El Oro and Loja, as well as in the Amazonian lands.

On October 2, with military observers from the three mediating countries serving as witnesses, Ecuador and Peru signed the Talara Accord, which created a demilitarized zone inside the provinces of El Oro and Loja, pending the signing of a definitive peace treaty. Diplomatic efforts continued, with the mediating countries being joined by Chile.

On January 29, 1942, on the final day of the third Pan-American Summit, held in Rio de Janeiro, the foreign ministers of Ecuador and Peru, Julio Tobar Donoso and Alfredo Solf y Muro, signed a "Protocol of Peace, Friendship, and Boundaries", known as the Rio de Janeiro Protocol. The observers from the United States, Brazil, Argentina, and Chile co-signed the document, becoming "Guarantors of the Protocol". The Rio Protocol was subsequently ratified by each country's congress on February 26, 1942.

By the terms of the Protocol, Ecuador agreed to withdraw its long-standing claim for rights to direct land access to the Marañon and Amazon rivers; Peru agreed to withdraw Peruvian military forces from Ecuadorian territory. An area of 200,000 km^{2} (77,000 sq mi) of hitherto disputed territory in the Maynas region of the Amazonian basin was awarded to Peru. The status quo line defined in the 1936 Lima Accord was used as the basis for the definitive border line; the previous border recognized current possessions, but not sovereignty. Relative to the 1936 line, Ecuador ceded 18,552 km^{2} of previously possessed territory to Peru, while Peru ceded 5,072 km^{2} of previously possessed territory to Ecuador.

The intended goal of the Rio Protocol was not fulfilled until the signing of the Itamaraty Peace Declaration in 1995. Between the signing of the two treaties, the Paquisha Incident and the Cenepa War rekindled the dispute.

== Sources ==
- Territorial Disputes and Their Resolution: The Case of Ecuador and Peru
- Text of the Rio Protocol
