= Ecuador–Peru border =

International border

Characteristics
- Entities: Ecuador Peru
- Length: 1,529 kilometres (950 mi)

History
- Established: c. 1830; Dissolution of Gran Colombia
- Current shape: 1998; Brasilia Presidential Act
- Treaties: See relevant page

The Ecuador–Peru border is an international border separating Ecuador from Peru. It extends from the Pacific Ocean at the Gulf of Guayaquil to the Putumayo River within the Amazon rainforest, first following the Zarumilla and Chira rivers and crossing into the Cordillera del Cóndor.

The history of the border was marked by a territorial dispute up until 1998, when the Brasilia Presidential Act was signed between then presidents Jamil Mahuad and Alberto Fujimori.

The border was closed from 2020 to early 2022 due to the COVID-19 pandemic.

== See also ==
- Colombia–Ecuador border
- Brazil–Peru border
- Chile–Peru border
- Ecuador–Peru relations
