= Peruvian Armed Forces =

Combined military services of Peru

- Fuerzas Armadas del Perú
- Peruvian Flag of War
- Founded: 28 July 1821; 205 years ago
- Service branches: Peruvian Army; Peruvian Navy; Peruvian Air Force
- Headquarters: Lima, Peru

Leadership
- Commander-in-chief: President Keiko Fujimori
- Minister of Defence: Rafael Belaunde Llosa
- Chief of the Joint Command: Army General David Ojeda Parra

Personnel
- Military age: 18
- Conscription: No
- Active personnel: 120,000 (2019)
- Reserve personnel: 386,000 (2019)

Expenditure
- Budget: $2 131 967 871 (2022 est.)
- Percent of GDP: 1.5% (2006 est.)

Industry
- Foreign suppliers: List of suppliers: Republic of Korea; United Kingdom; Singapore; European Union; Russia; United States; France; Italy; Belarus; Spain; China; Ukraine; Mexico; Serbia; South Africa; Israel; Argentina; India; Cuba; Brazil; Former: Democratic People's Republic of Korea

Related articles
- Ranks: Military ranks of Peru

The Peruvian Armed Forces (Spanish: Fuerzas Armadas del Perú) are the military services of Peru, comprising independent Army, Navy and Air Force components. Their primary mission is to safeguard the country's independence, sovereignty and territorial integrity against any threat. As a secondary mission they participate in economic and social development as well as in civil defence tasks.

The National Police of Peru is often classified as a part of the armed forces. Although in fact it has a different organisation and a wholly civil mission, its training and activities over more than two decades as an anti-terrorist force have produced markedly military characteristics, giving it the appearance of a virtual fourth military service with significant land, sea and air capabilities and approximately 140,000 personnel. The Peruvian armed forces report through the Ministry of Defence, while the National Police of Peru report through the Ministry of Interior.

== History ==
=== 19th century ===
The Peruvian Army was officially established on 18 August 1821 when the Peruvian Guard Legion was established by the government of general José de San Martín during the Peruvian War of Independence. San Martín would found the Peruvian Navy months later on 8 October 1821.

The first international conflict fought by the newly formed republic was the Gran Colombia-Peru War, a maritime and terrestrial conflict against the state of the Gran Colombia, which was formed by the current-day states of Colombia, Ecuador, Panama and Venezuela. In early 1828, an incursion of Colombian troops in Bolivia sent by Simon Bolivar with the objective of gaining a foothold and influence in the country, forced Peru to launch a campaign against Bolivia to successfully force the Colombian expeditionary force to leave the country. Furious, Bolivar resolved to declare war against Peru on June 3, 1828, with former president of Bolivia Antonio Jose de Sucre being appointed Commander of the Colombian Army. The Peruvian Navy immediately proceeded to occupy and establish blockades along the Gran Colombia coasts, winning the first confrontation in the Battle of Punta Malpelo, forcing the Colombians to retreat. Victorious, the Peruvian navy set its sights on the strategic port of Guayaquil and proceeded to attack it at the Battle of Cruces, which saw the destruction of the Grancolombian pacific fleet and the naval blockade of the city of Guayaquil until the end of the conflict. In the land, the ties were more balanced, with the outnumbered Peruvian Army seizing the city of Cuenca on the Battle of Saraguro on February 13, 1829, and pushing north near Guayaquil. However, Venezuelan general De Sucre inflicted a defeat on the Peruvians at the Battle of Tarqui. The vastly outnumbered 900 Peruvian infantrymen were forced to retreat against the approaching 4,500 Grancolombian counterattack force in order to evade an encirclement. After the battle, Peru adopted a defensive strategy, establishing defensive lines along the Jaen and Maynas, which were claimed by the Grancolombians and one of their motivations for the war. After a series of skirmishes, the Peruvian army was able to hold those provinces, but had to end the occupation of Guayaquil. On February 28, 1829, Peruvian president La Mar and Sucre signed the La Mar-Sucre convention, which ended hostilities but left the borders on an ambiguous state. Yet, this was seen as a political win by the Peruvians, as holding these provinces opened the way of annexation, which would later be the cause of several Peruvian-Ecuadorian wars after the dissolution of the Gran Colombia in 1830.

The next major conflict faced Peru against the newly independent state of Ecuador in the Ecuadorian-Peruvian War (1857-1860), the first of the main conflicts between these two countries. The conflict originated due to the international debt Ecuador, as the Gran Colombia, had to take from European creditors, mainly British, after the war of independence from Spain. Wanting to find a source of income, finances minister Francisco de Paula gave the creditors rights to several territories in the forest, some of them over disputed lands with Peru. This caused a Peruvian protest, as the controversy of the lands, specifically of the northern half of the Department of Loreto in Peru was a major point of contention first with the Gran Colombia, and then with Ecuador and Colombia. Ecuador reinstated its sovereign over the lands north of the Amazon, and assured British creditors of their rights over that territory. Thus, on October 26, 1858, the Peruvian congress authorized president Ramón Castilla to command and army against Ecuador if needed to secure the national territory against European creditors. A blockade against Ecuadorian ports was also preferred. On November 1, 1858, the first Peruvian frigate arrived in Ecuadorian waters, and the start of the blockade of Guayaquil and Quito started. By this time, Ecuador was facing an internal crisis, called by Ecuadorian history books as the “Terrible Year”, in which a number of different politicians were fighting for control of the country as its coasts were in the middle of a blockade. Receiving no response from an unified Ecuadorian government, Castilla ordered 5,000 of his troops to advance into the Ecuadorian province of “Mapasingue”, near Guayaquil, in order to force Ecuador to accept the Peruvians terms and to abandon its desires on the Amazon. Force by military action, the four governments vying for control of Ecuador selected caudillo Guillermo Franco as the sole representative of the country, signing the Treaty of Mapasingue with Castilla, thus agreeing to the Peruvian terms and stating the withdrawal of Peruvian troops from Ecuador. This angered the Ecuadorians, which called Franco as a traitor for collaborating with the Peruvians, and ousted him in the Battle of Guayaquil. This action strengthened the Peruvian position on the Amazon, which would not be challenged until the next century.

The War of the Pacific, a conflict between the Bolivia-Peru alliance and Chile resulted with one of the armed forces' worst failures as Chilean troops occupied the capital of Lima and the southern provinces, with Peru ceding the mineral-rich Arica Province to Chile after signing the Treaty of Ancón and later treaties. The incompetence of the government and military was so great during the War of the Pacific period that it led to an intellectual movement dedicated to restoring pride for Peru, creating modern Peruvian nationalism.

=== 20th century ===
On 20 May 1929, the Peruvian Air Force was created as the Peruvian Aviation Corps when the aviation units of the army and navy merged. Following World War II and the Ecuadorian–Peruvian War, the Joint Command of the Armed Forces of Peru was created in 1957 after observations were made that the branches needed a centralized organization to coordinate the activities of the branches.

When the government of Manuel Prado Ugarteche attempted to move political power to civilians, the military became upset with the new approach. In addition, the 1962 Peruvian general election saw the rise of the American Popular Revolutionary Alliance, with the armed forces and traditional aristocrats viewing their platform of land reform and the political inclusion of the indigenous peoples of Peru as a threat. After Fernando Belaúnde, a presidential candidate in election, raised concerns of electoral fraud, the military would support Belaúnde and would commit the 1962 Peruvian coup d'état against President Prado.

The Revolutionary Government of the Armed Forces of Peru led the nation following the 1968 Peruvian coup d'état, first headed by Juan Velasco Alvarado, who instituted left-wing policies that included nationalizing the economy and enacting the Peruvian Agrarian Reform. During the Revolutionary Government, the nation's debt increased heavily as a result of excessive borrowing and the 1970s energy crisis. Following the Tacnazo and subsequent overthrow of Velasco in 1975, Francisco Morales Bermúdez would lead the Revolutionary Government until 1980, with his military government participating in the political repression of leftists during Operation Condor.

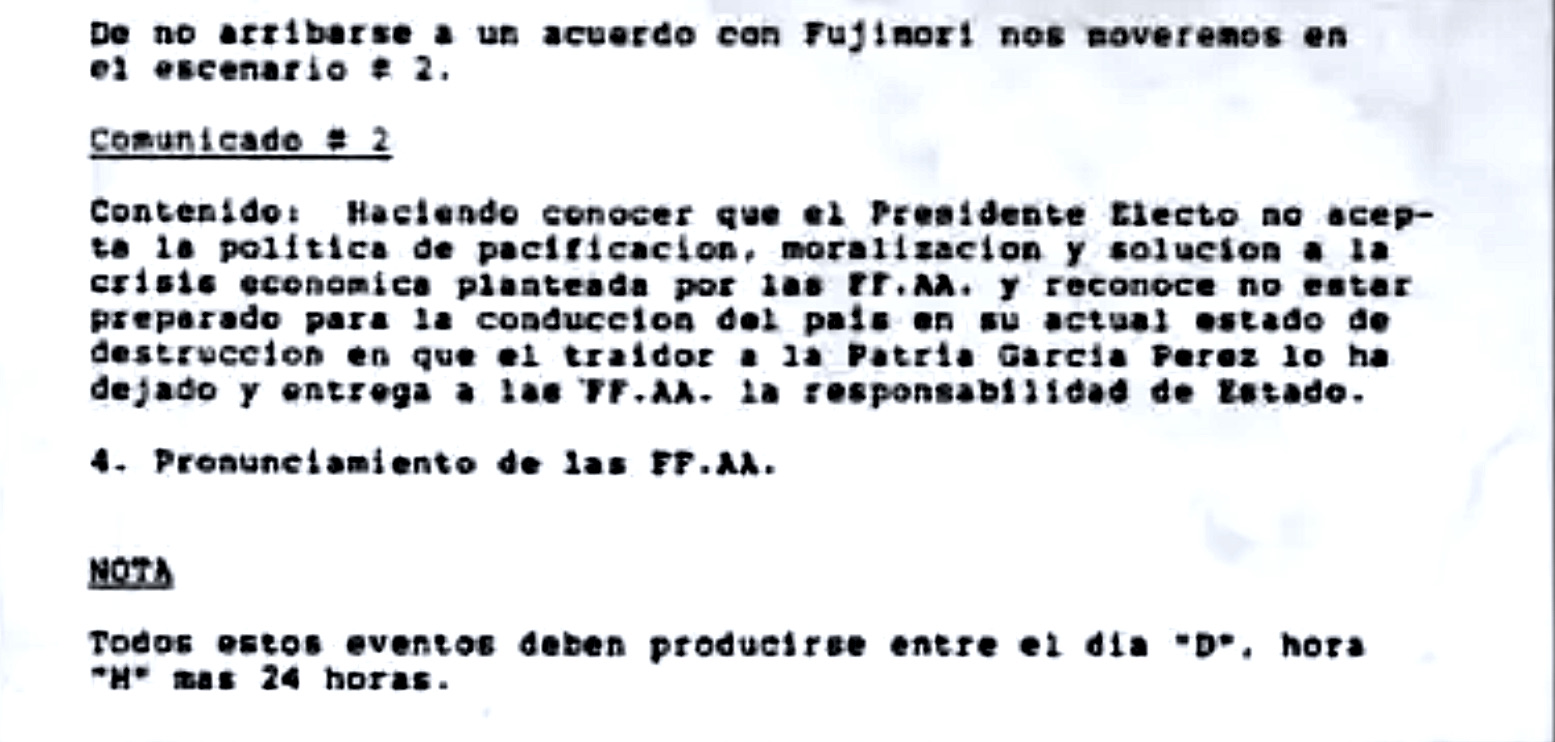
Excerpt of Plan Verde addendum that was created following the election of Alberto Fujimori

During the government of Alan García, the nation would begin to begin to experience hyperinflation and increased the beginning of the internal conflict in Peru with Shining Path. The armed force's perception that President Garcia's policies were detrimental to the nation resulted with the creation of Plan Verde, a clandestine military operation that involved the genocide of impoverished and indigenous Peruvians, the control or censorship of media in the nation and the establishment of a neoliberal economy controlled by a military junta in Peru. A coup initially included in the plan was opposed by Anthony C. E. Quainton, the United States Ambassador to Peru. Military planners also decided against the coup as they expected Mario Vargas Llosa, a neoliberal candidate, to be elected in the 1990 Peruvian general election. Vargas Llosa later reported that Ambassador Quainton, personally told him that allegedly leaked documents of the Central Intelligence Agency (CIA) purportedly being supportive of the candidacy of his opponent, Alberto Fujimori, were authentic, with Rendón writing that the United States supported Fujimori because of his relationship with Vladimiro Montesinos, who had previously been charged with spying on the Peruvian armed forces for the CIA.

Fujimori was elected president of Peru in 1990, planning a coup with his military handlers during his next two years in office, with Fujimori becoming a figurehead leader and adopting many of the objectives of Plan Verde following the 1992 Peruvian self-coup. During the Fujimori administration, Montesinos would assume control of the government and placed weak officers as branch heads in order to maintain control, with every military branch's leader being personally filled by Montesinos. During this time, the armed forces' Grupo Colina death squad would kill dozens during various massacres in Peru and the military would participate in the Cenepa War against Ecuador in 1995.

=== 21st century ===
Following the downfall of Fujimori and Montesinos, the use of the terruqueo in the beginning of the twenty-first century was used to influence the public instead of violence performed by the military, though its use would provide impunity to members of the armed forces who violently responded to protests in the nation. Following the 2022 Peruvian political crisis, widespread protests occurred throughout Peru; the armed forces performed human rights violations against demonstrators and the politicization of the armed forces created concerns about the creation of a civilian-military government in Peru.

== Service branches ==
=== Joint Command ===
The Joint Command of the Armed Forces is tasked with the mission to "plan, prepare, coordinate and conduct military operations and actions to guarantee independence, sovereignty and territorial integrity and support the national development of Peru". This branch of the armed forces was developed in the 1950s following World War II, when Peru evaluated operational tactics used and adapted them to their own military. On 1 February 1957, the Joint Command was created following a commission of defense agencies studied its role, with the Joint Command depending directly on the President of Peru while also being "the highest step in the planning and coordination of the operations of the Army, Navy and Aeronautics Forces".

=== Army ===
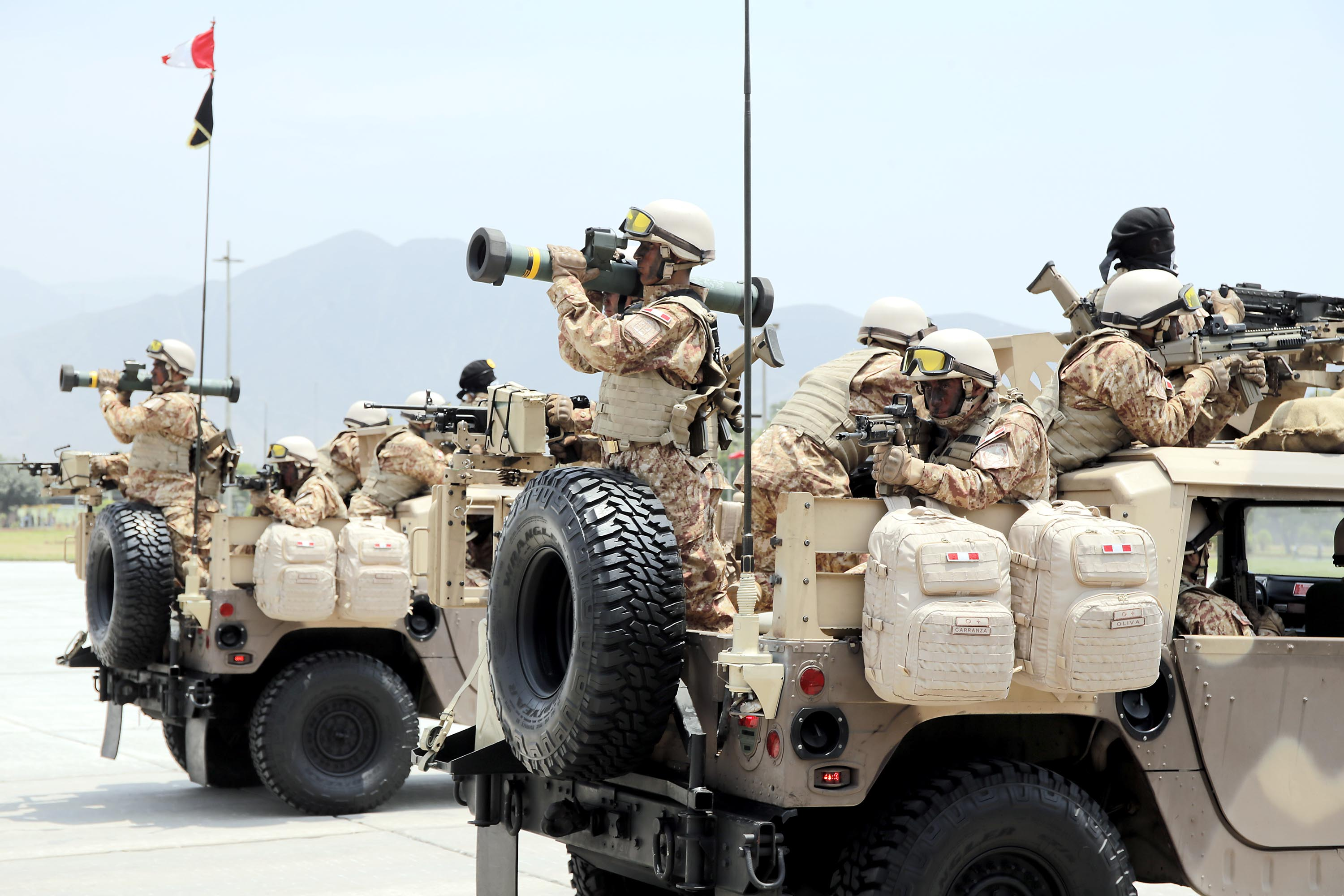
Peruvian infantry being transported

Headquartered in Lima, it has a strength of 90,000 troops divided in four military regions with headquarters in Piura, Lima, Arequipa and Iquitos. Every military region is assigned several brigades of which there are different types, including infantry, cavalry and armored. There are also several groups and battalions which operate independently of the army's organization.

The equipment of the Peruvian Army includes infantry weapons that include rifles and carbines such as the M16A2 and the M4A1 and pistols like the FN Five-seveN and Smith & Wesson M&P9.

Vehicles include several types of tanks (T-55 and AMX-13), armoured personnel carriers (M-113, UR-416), artillery (D30, M101, M109 and M114 howitzers), antiaircraft systems (ZSU-23-4 Shilka) and helicopters (Mil Mi-2, Mil Mi-17). Recently, Peru has sought to update their collection of tanks and armored personnel carriers that have not been updated since acquiring vehicles from the Soviet Union. After an initial deal with China fell through, Peru has attempted to make a deal with General Dynamics to purchase new military vehicles.

=== Navy ===
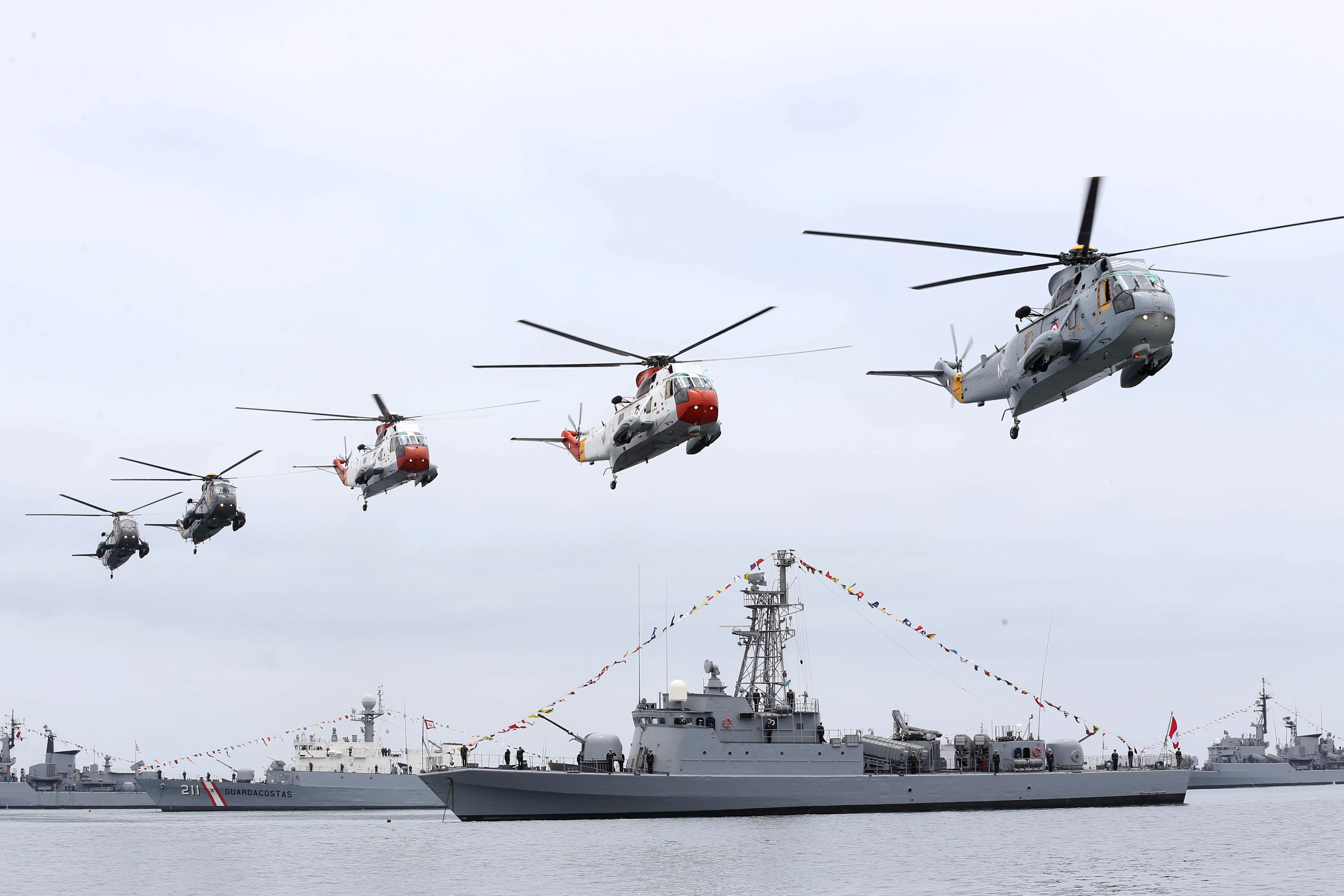
Peruvian Navy ceremony, 2016

The Peruvian Navy (Marina de Guerra del Perú) is organized in five naval zones headquartered in Piura, Lima, Arequipa, Iquitos and Pucallpa. It has a strength of around 25,988 troops divided between the Pacific Operations and the Amazon Operations General Commands and the Coast Guard.

The Pacific fleet flagship is the guided-missile cruiser BAP Almirante Grau (FM-53), named for the 19th-century Peruvian Admiral who fought in the War of the Pacific (1879–1883). The fleet also includes 7 Lupo class frigates (two built in Peru), 6 PR-72P class corvettes, 2 Pohang-class corvettes, several amphibious ships, 2 Type 209/1100 and 4 Type 209/1200 class German-built diesel submarines (the biggest submarine force in South America), as well as patrol vessels, tankers and cargo ships. The Peruvian Navy also has a naval aviation force, several naval infantry battalions and special forces units.

==== Marines ====
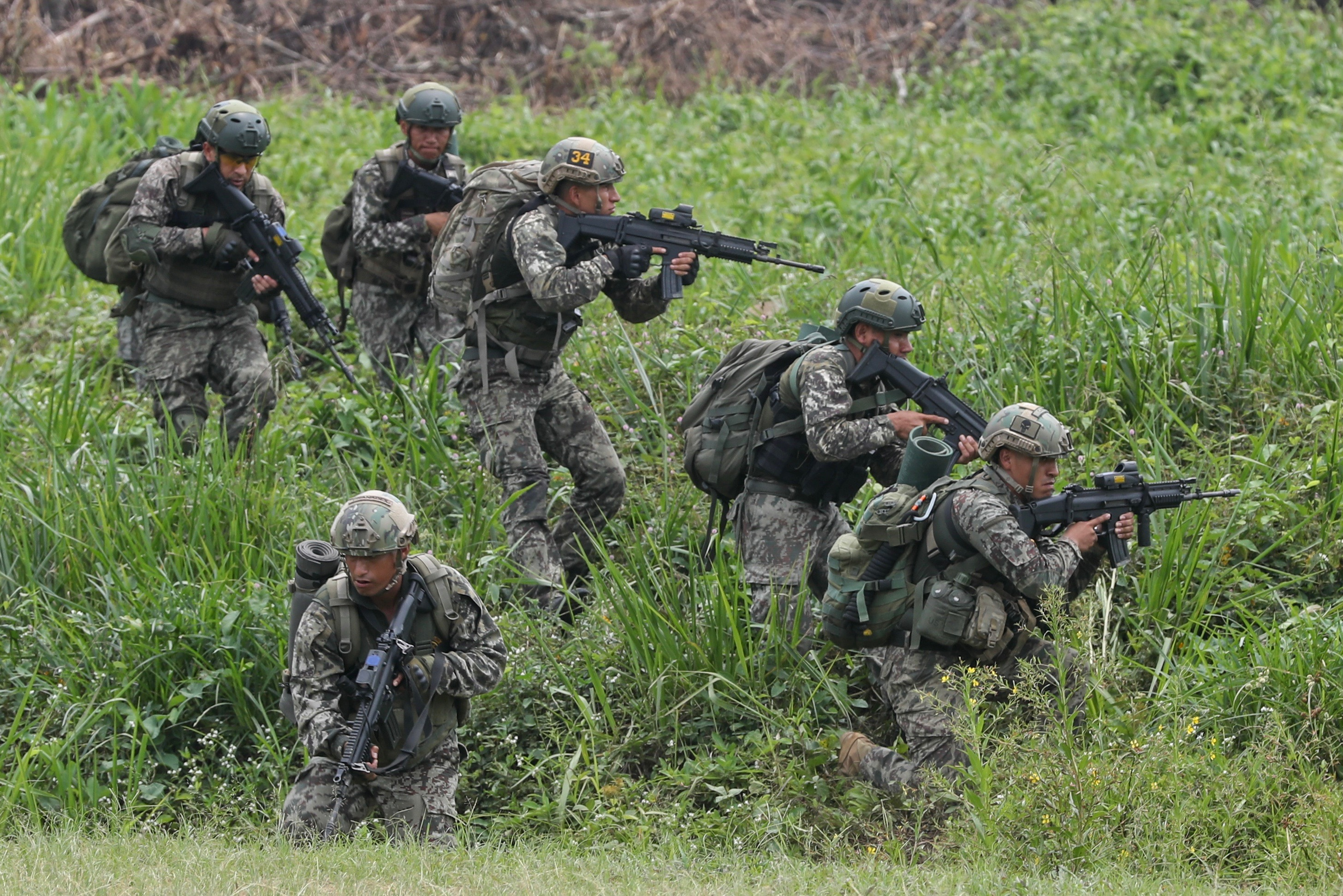
Peruvian marines in the VRAEM in 2019

The Peruvian Marines date back to 6 November 1821, when the Peruvian Navy requested a battalion of soldiers. Its first battle was an attack on the Spanish, successfully taking the city of Arica (today Tacna). Into the mid-20th century, the Peruvian Marines modernized their equipment and by the 1980s with the Shining Path emerging as a new threat to Peru, the Marines began to be tasked with counterterrorism operations.

As part of the Peruvian Navy, the Peruvian Marines utilize the equipment and logistics of the Navy. Various Marine battalions are based in Ancón, Iquitos, Mollendo, Pucallpa, Puno and Tumbes. The Peruvian Marines also have a Special Forces composed of the Espíritus Negros and Fuerza Delta, based on the American Delta Force and US Army Rangers.

=== Air Force ===
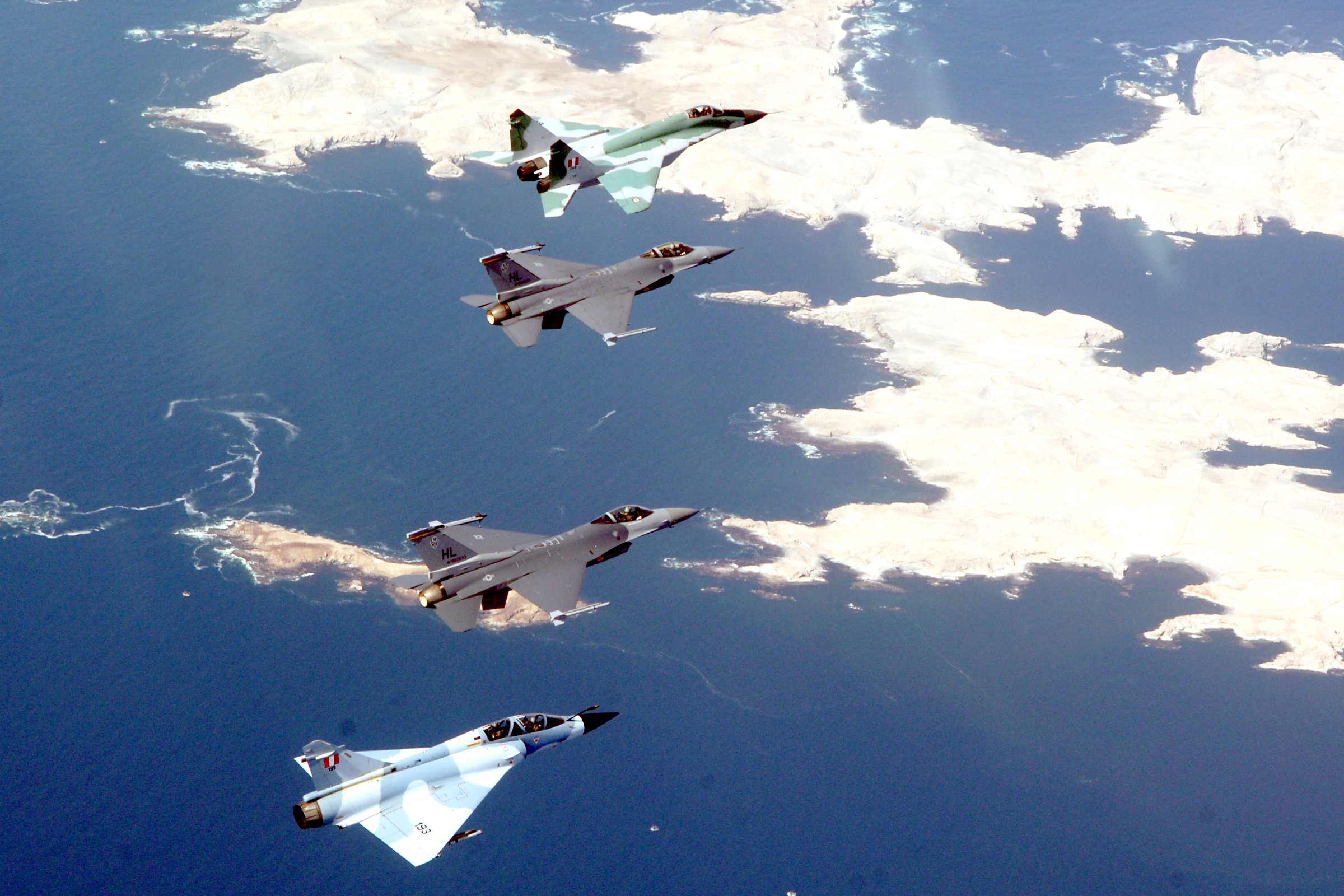
Peruvian and United States air forces during a joint exercise in 2007

On May 20, 1929, the aviation divisions of the Peruvian army and navy were merged into the Peruvian Aviation Corps (CAP, Cuerpo de Aviación del Peru). In 1950, the corps was reorganized again and became the Peruvian Air Force (FAP, Fuerza Aérea del Perú).

The Peruvian Air Force is divided into six wing areas, headquartered in Piura, Chiclayo, Lima, Arequipa, Rioja and Iquitos. With a strength of 17,969 troops, the FAP counts in its arsenal with MiG-29 (interceptor) and Mirage 2000 (interdictor / multirole aircraft).

It also has Su-25 close-support aircraft, Mi-25 attack helicopters, Mi-17 transport helicopters, Aermacchi MB-339, Embraer EMB-312 Tucano subsonic training aircraft, and the Cessna A-37B for light attack and COIN missions.

In 1995, the FAP took part in the Cenepa War against Ecuador covering operations by the army and navy. After the war, the FAP began acquiring new aircraft, especially MiG-29 fighters and Su-25 close air support aircraft which are, along with the Mirage 2000 fighters, the main combat elements of the FAP.
