= List of battles of the Peruvian Navy =

This is a list of major battles fought by the Peruvian Navy since its creation in 1821.

== Gran Colombia-Peru War (1828-1829) ==
- Battle of Punta Malpelo (August 31, 1828)
- Battle of Cruces (November 22, 1828)

== War of the Peru-Bolivian Confederation (1835-1839) ==
- Battle of Islay (January 12, 1838)
- Battle of Casma (January 12, 1839)

== Chincha Islands War (1865-1866) ==
- Battle of Abtao (February 7, 1866)
- Battle of Callao (May 2, 1866)

== Piérola Uprising (1877) ==
- Battle of Pacocha (May 6, 1877)

== War of the Pacific (1879-1883) ==
- Battle of Chipana (April 12, 1879)
- Battle of Iquique (May 21, 1879)
- Battle of Punta Gruesa (May 21, 1879)
- Battle of Angamos (October 8, 1879)

== War with Colombia (1911) ==
- Battle of La Pedrera (July 10–12, 1911)

== Sources ==
- Basadre, Jorge, Historia de la República del Perú. Editorial Universitaria, 1983.
