= Malpelo =

Malpelo may refer to:

- Malpelo Island off Colombia's Pacific coast
- Punta Malpelo, a point in Peru near the border with Ecuador.
