= Battle of Cruces =

Nineteenth century naval battle

- Part of the Gran Colombia–Peru War
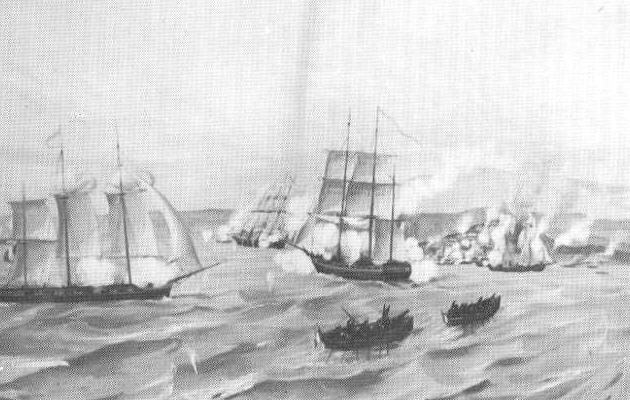
- Painting from the Naval Museum of Peru depicting the Battle of Cruces.
Date	22–24 November 1828
Location	Las Cruces Castle, near Guayaquil, Ecuador
Result	Peruvian victory; Blockade of the coast Gran Colombian since Guayaquil to Panamá by the Peruvian Navy; Later Occupation of Guayaquil by the Peruvian Army until the end of the Gran Colombian-Peruvian War

Belligerents
Gran Colombia	Peru

Commanders and leaders
(Gran Colombia) Thomas Charles Wright (surrendered) (Gran Colombia) Juan Illingworth (surrendered)	(Peru) Martin George Guisse † (Peru) José Boterín (Peru) Hipólito Bouchard

Strength
Schooner Guayaquileña; Brig Adela; Guayaquil Batteries	Frigate Presidente; Corvette Libertad; Schooner Peruviana

Casualties and losses
1 brig sunk 1 schooner captured Batteries captured	13 casualties

The battle of Cruces was a naval confrontation between the Peruvian and the Gran Colombian navy which occurred from 22 to 24 November 1828. The following blockade of the port of Guayaquil by the Peruvian Navy proved decisive in obtaining maritime dominance during the war and subsequently marked the end of the naval campaign between Peru and Gran-Colombia.

== Background ==
Following the naval battle of Punta Malpelo on 31 August 1828 which saw the Peruvian navy victorious over that of Gran-Colombia, the Peruvian navy next set their sights on the strategic port of Guayaquil in modern-day Ecuador. The Peruvian navy assembled a fleet consisting of the Frigate Presidente, Corvette Libertad (a veteran of the battle of Punta Malpeto) and Schooner Peruviana under the command of Vice Admiral Martin George Guisse with the goal of capturing the port and establishing a naval blockade. A number of raids were conducted by the fleet near Guayaquil before the decision was made to attack the port city directly on 22 November 1828.

== The Battle ==
When the Peruvian fleet reached Las Cruces Castle near Guayaquil on 22 November 1828, Vice Admiral Guisse aboard his flagship Presidente ordered his ships in attack formation and readied his 259 crew and 52 guns for battle. Guisse managed to break through the natural defence that the estuary offered and overran the Gran-Colombian defences, inflicting heavy damage on the fort of Las Cruces in the process, which was abandoned by its defenders after suffering multiple casualties. The troops on board the Schooner Peruviana were ordered to disembark and capture the now evacuated fort, while the Corvette Libertad went on to capture the shipyard.

By the next morning, the Gran-Colombian Brig Adela engaged the Peruvian fleet in battle with cover from the battery stationed in the customs office. The Peruvians quickly overpowered Adela and her crew decided to scuttle their ship by setting her ablaze as to not let her fall into enemy hands, while the battery ceased firing. At 3pm Guisse decided to abandon the fort of Las Cruces and destroyed 2 out of her 3 batteries, while dismantling the third to incorporate it into the Peruvian fleet. The fort was thereafter set on fire and subsequently destroyed. At the same time the Gran-Colombian Schooner Guayaquileña along with her 12 guns fell into Peruvian hands, she was also a veteran of the [[Battle of Punta Malpelo]]. After it became clear that Guayaquil had no intention to surrender to the Peruvian fleet, Guisse ordered his ships to withdraw from the estuary at 9pm. But following a bad maneuver during their retreat, Guisses flagship Presidente ran aground on a shoal. The commander of the Gran-Colombian forces Admiral Thomas Charles Wright took advantage of the situation and managed to install a canon within firing range of the stricken frigate and staged a counterattack. Presidente wasn't able to maneuver into position to return fire onto the Gran-Colombian forces while at the same time her compromised position on the shoal meant that the other ships of the Peruvian fleet couldn't assist or reinforce her. So the fleet remained anchored nearby as they waited for high tide to refloat the ship.

High tide ultimately came by noon of 24 November 1828 and Presidente was refloated. Still under fire from the Gran-Colombian forces, Presidente hastily made sail towards the rest of the Peruvian fleet, but one of the last shots fired during the battle by a sniper struck Vice Admiral Martin George Guisse in the chest, mortally wounding him. First lieutenant José Boterín who was in command of the Corvette Libertad became the commanding officer of the fleet following Guisse's death. 12 other men died alongside Vice-Admiral Guisse while the number of casualties on the Gran-Colombian side remains unknown.

== Aftermath ==
First lieutenant Boterín continued the blockade and siege of Guayaquil while Admiral Wright attempted to rebuild the Gran-Colombian defences following the loss of the fort and that of Guayaquileña and Adela. The Gran-Colombian garrison stationed at Guayaquil was ultimately ordered to withdraw in order to join the army of Venezuelan General Antonio José de Sucre and negotiations began for the capitulation of the city. The forces at Guayaquil officially surrendered to the Peruvians on 19 January 1829 after signing a formal document stating their capitulation on board the schooner Arequipeña. Peruvian troops went on to occupy the city on 1 February 1829. Following the end of the war on 28 February 1829, resulting in a stalemate between the warring states, the Armistice of Piura was signed on 10 July 1829 which recognised the annexation of Guayaquil to Gran Colombia. The last Peruvian troops therefor left Guayaquil on 21 July 1829 and the city was successfully reincorporated into Gran Colombia.
