= Granaderos de Tarqui =

President of Ecuador's honour guard

- Grupo de Caballería Escolta Presidencial "Granaderos de Tarqui"
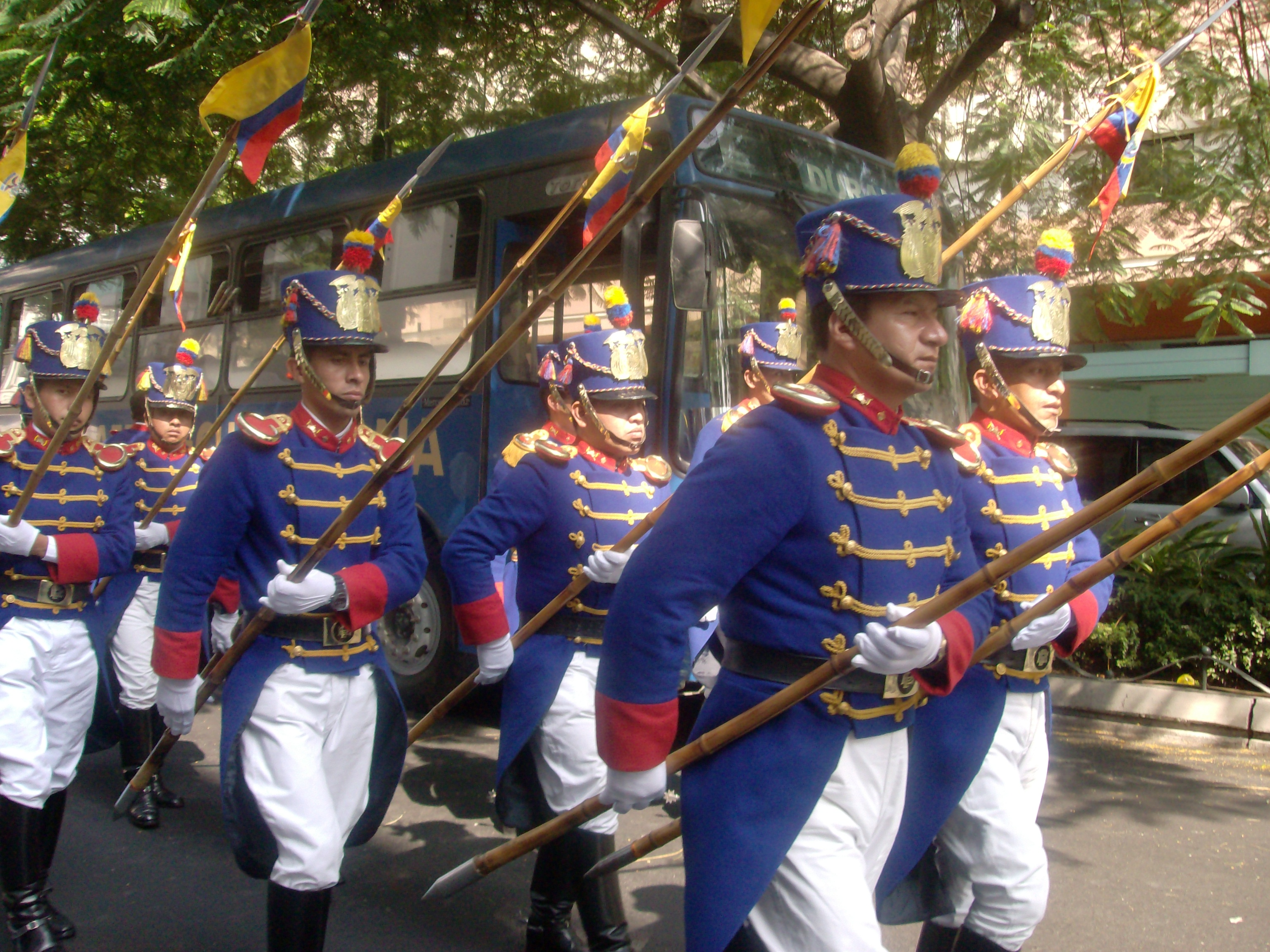
- Active: 27 February 1829; 197 years ago
- Country: Ecuador
- Branch: Ecuadorian Army
- Type: Guard of honour
- Role: Ceremonial guard Protection service
- Part of: Presidential Protection Service
- Garrison/HQ: Quito
- Nickname: Presidential Escort Group
- Motto: Loyalty until sacrifice

The Presidential Escort Group "Granaderos de Tarqui" (Spanish: Grupo de Caballería Escolta Presidencial "Granaderos de Tarqui") is the President of Ecuador's honour guard service regiment, which protects the Carondelet Palace in Quito. Granaderos de Tarqui, means Tarqui Grenadiers in Spanish.

== Background ==
The history of the Granaderos dates from the era of independence revolutions in Latin America. The Granaderos have their origin in the troops commanded by Marshal Antonio José de Sucre who was responsible for the Ecuadorian victory in the Battle of Pichincha in 1822, which effectively sealed the independence of Ecuador from Spain. These troops also participated in the Battle of Tarqui on February 27, 1829, in the provinces of Azuay and Loja. The Grenadiers trace thus its heritage from the Ecuadorian cavalrymen of the cavalry regiments of the Gran Colombia Army who fought with Simón Bolívar and José de San Martín during this period of struggle for independence. Later in the 19th century, the Government Palace of Quito was beginning to be guarded by Army units, which had their headquarters in the nearby building of the former colonial battalion Real de Lima. Despite this, they never served permanently as Ecuadorian presidents have historically never had a permanent bodyguard until that point.

On January 25, 1919, the 1st Cavalry Group was first organized as Presidential Escort, which remained in effect until 1940. On October 31, 1952, by executive order of President José María Velasco Ibarra, a reform of army units was carried out, with the escort having more of a public role. In 1987, then President León Febres Cordero published a ministerial resolution on the unit, officially giving it the honorary title "Tarqui Grenadiers", in honor of the troopers who perished during the namesake battle. Under the government of Rafael Correa, the Presidential Military House and the Presidential Air Transport Squadron in the Presidential Protection Service were merged, and attached to the Presidency of the Republic. Correa also decreed that the ceremony of Guard Mounting is to be held every Monday in the Plaza de la Independencia of Quito, open to the public and in the presence of the President and other dignitaries of the State.

== Functions ==
The regiment has the following roles in its service:

- Provide honors for the President of Ecuador
- Provide honors for Heads of State during official visits to Quito
- Provide honors for deceased leaders and figures
- Raise and lower the national flag at the Government Palace.

=== Composition ===
- Headquarters Company
- Presidential Mounted Ceremonial Squadron
  - 1st Squadron
  - 2nd Squadron
  - Mounted fanfare band
- Presidential Band
- Drill Team Company

== Uniform ==
Their regimental uniform is of French influence and was worn by soldiers who fought with Antonio José de Sucre in the Latin American wars of independence and specifically in the Battle of Tarqui. It consists of a shako made of blue cloth with tricolor plume and the state emblem towards the front, a blue jacket with neck and rigid sleeves lined with red cloth, epaulettes, white denim pants, and black boots. The regiment also wears white suede gloves during its public duties. Officers carry a steel sword with a lion's head hilt and gilded gilt on the fire and carved in high relief, while the regiment's NCOs carry a lance with a tricolor pennant when they march on horseback and on foot.

== Gallery ==
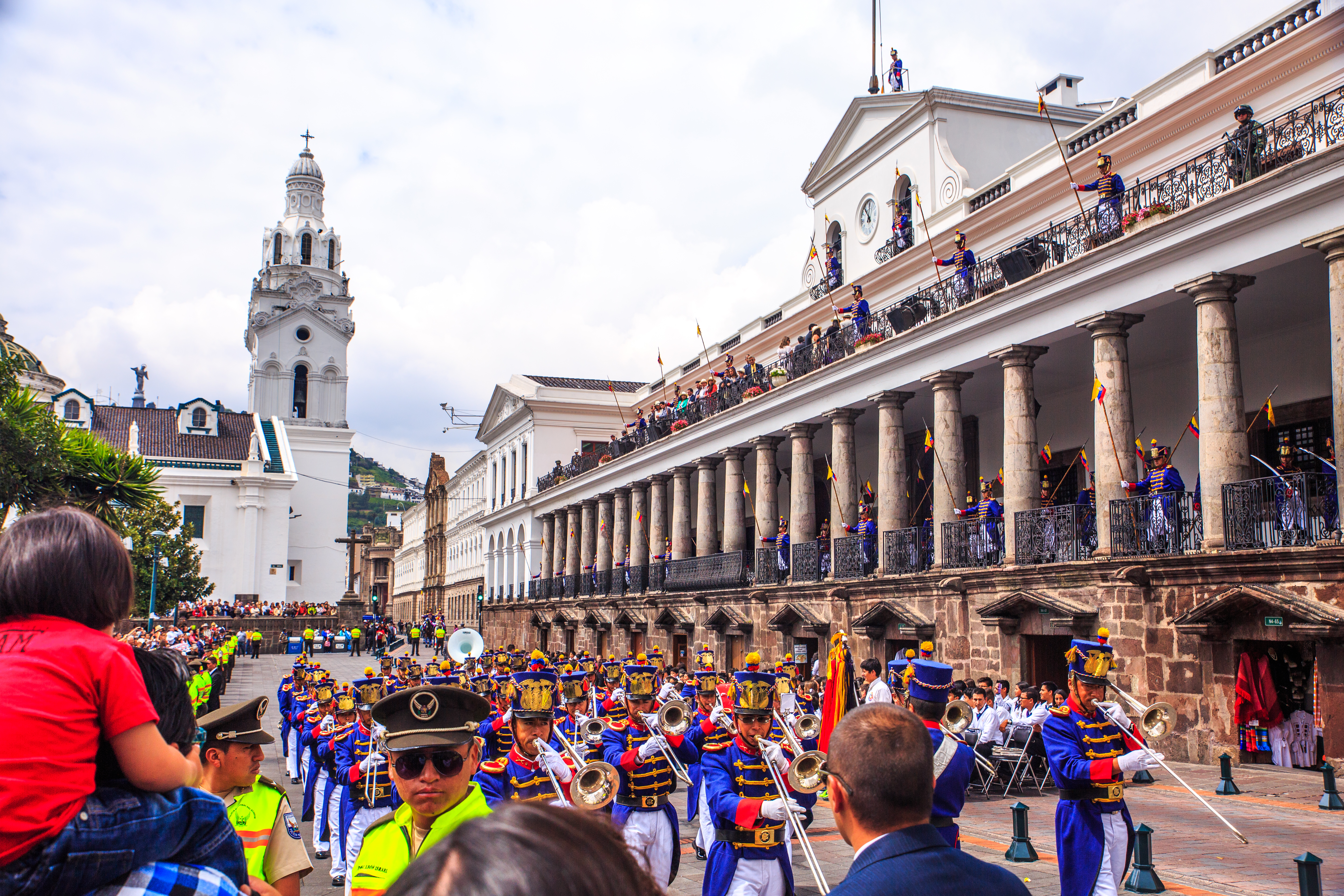
The squadron band

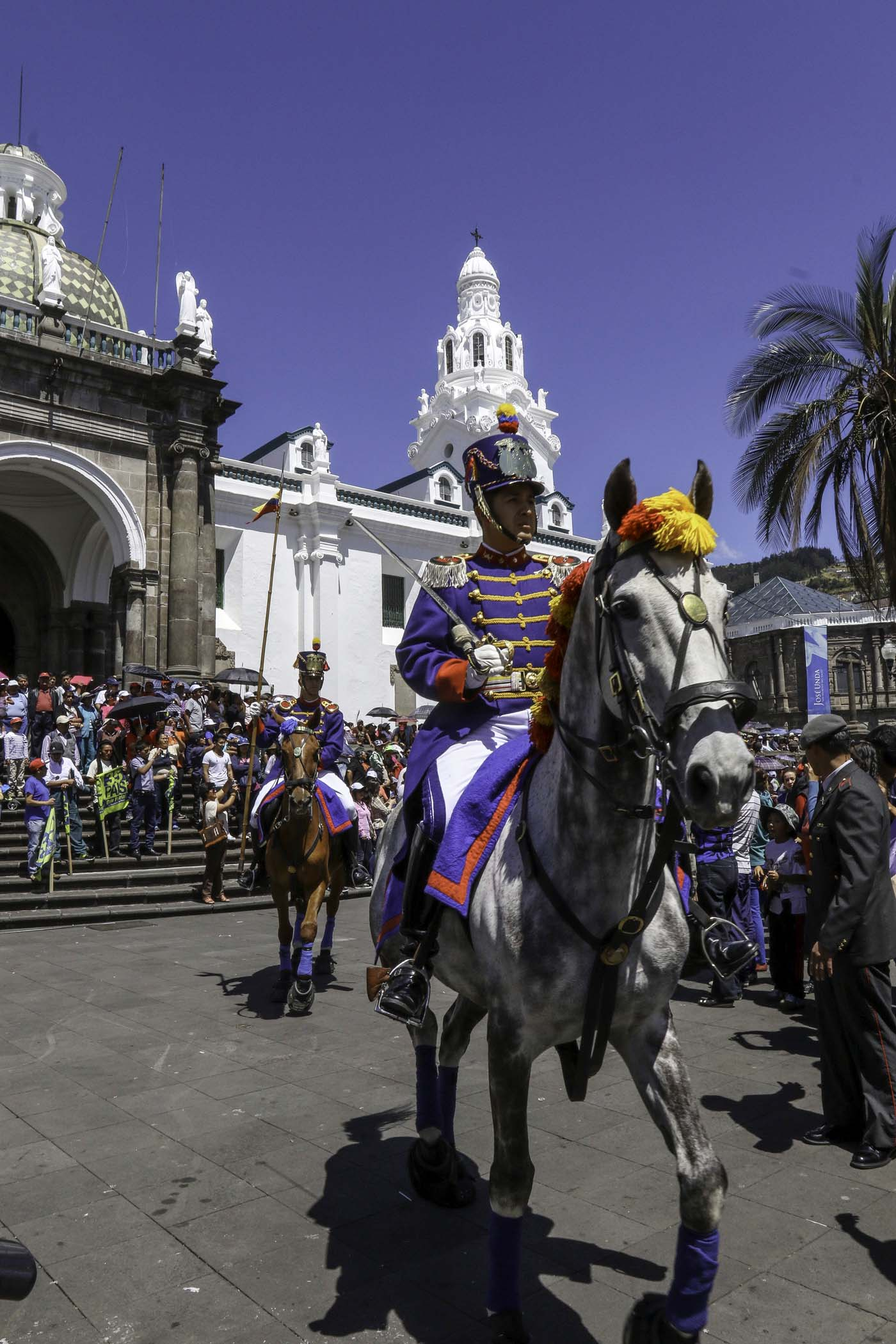
A mounted soldier

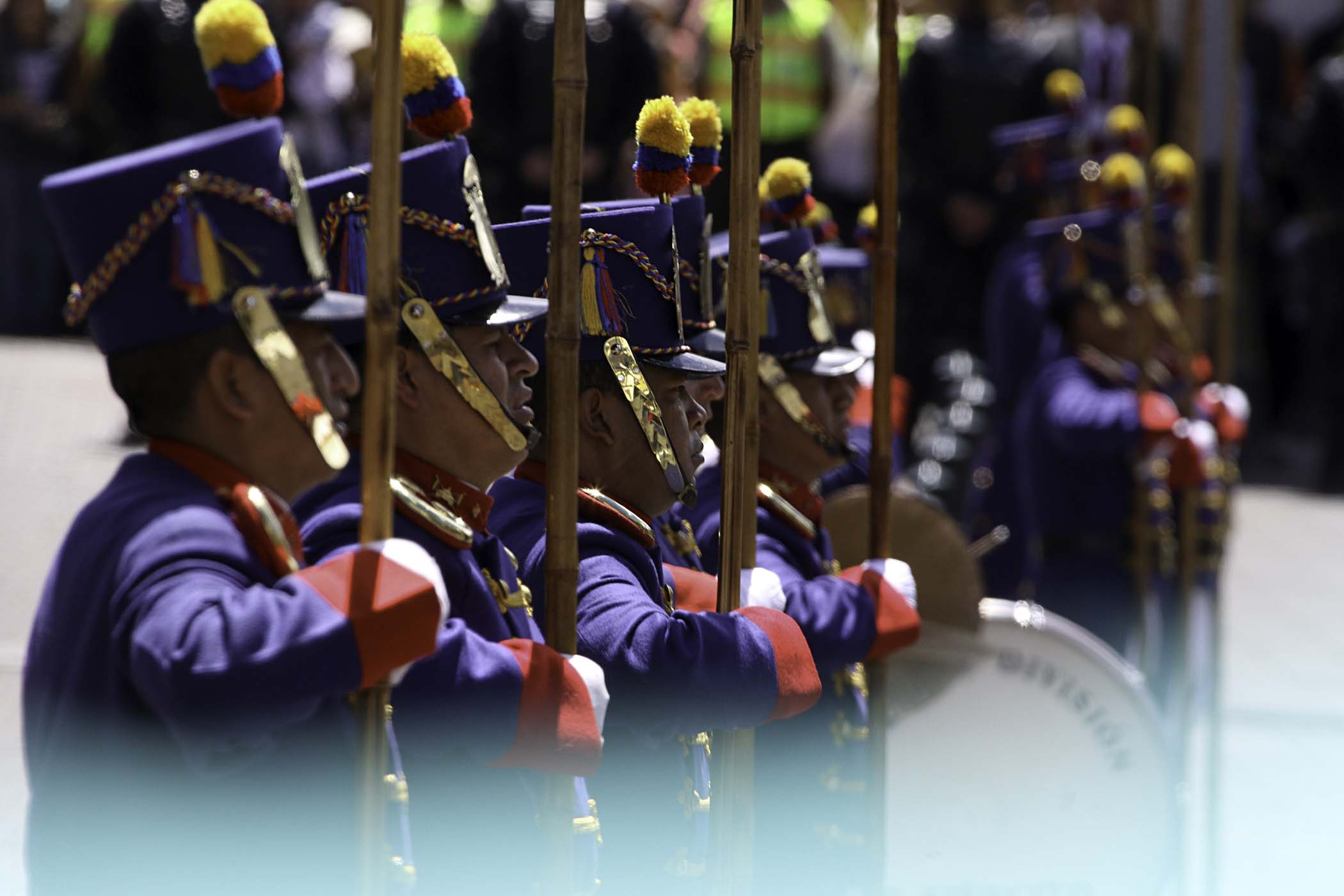

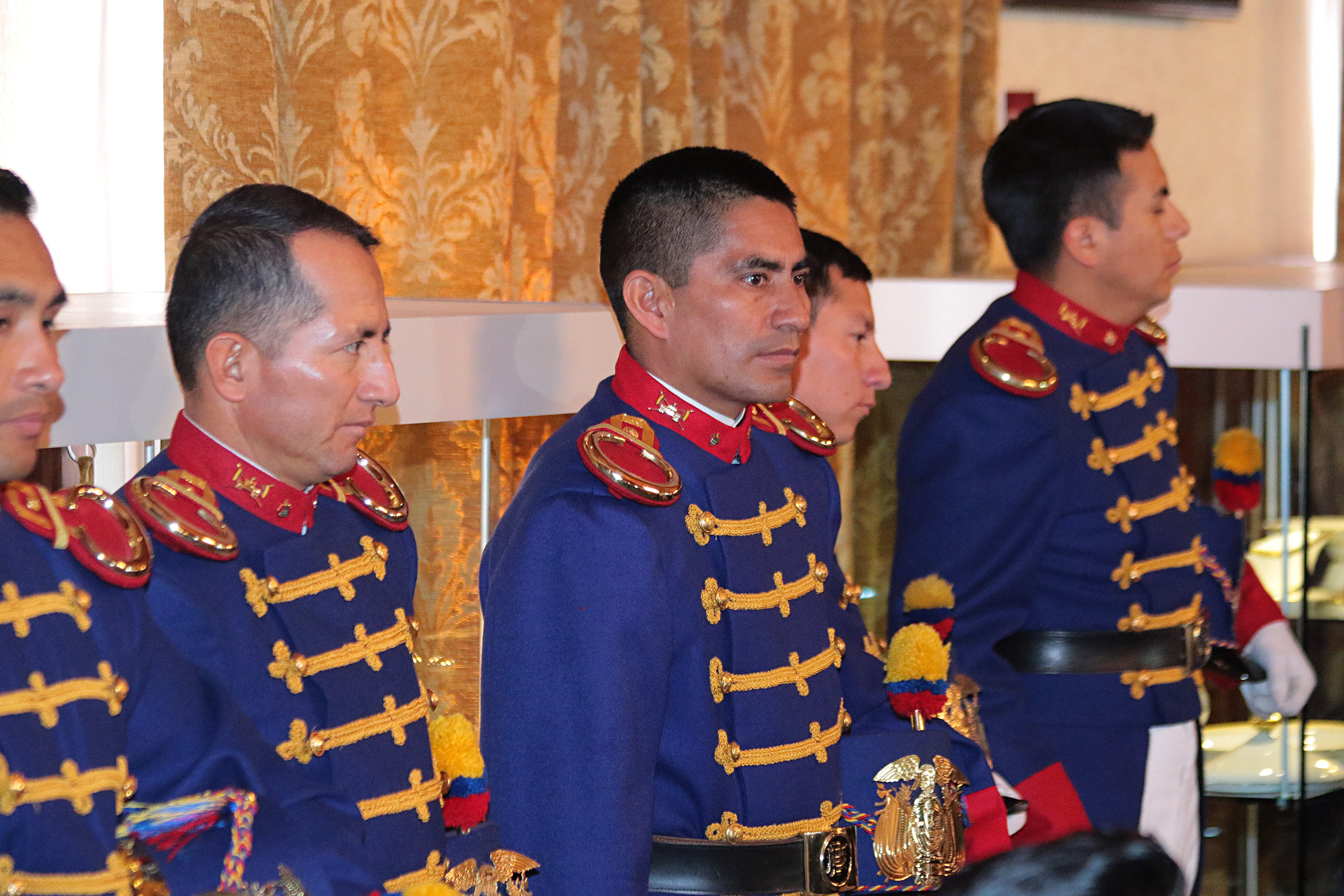

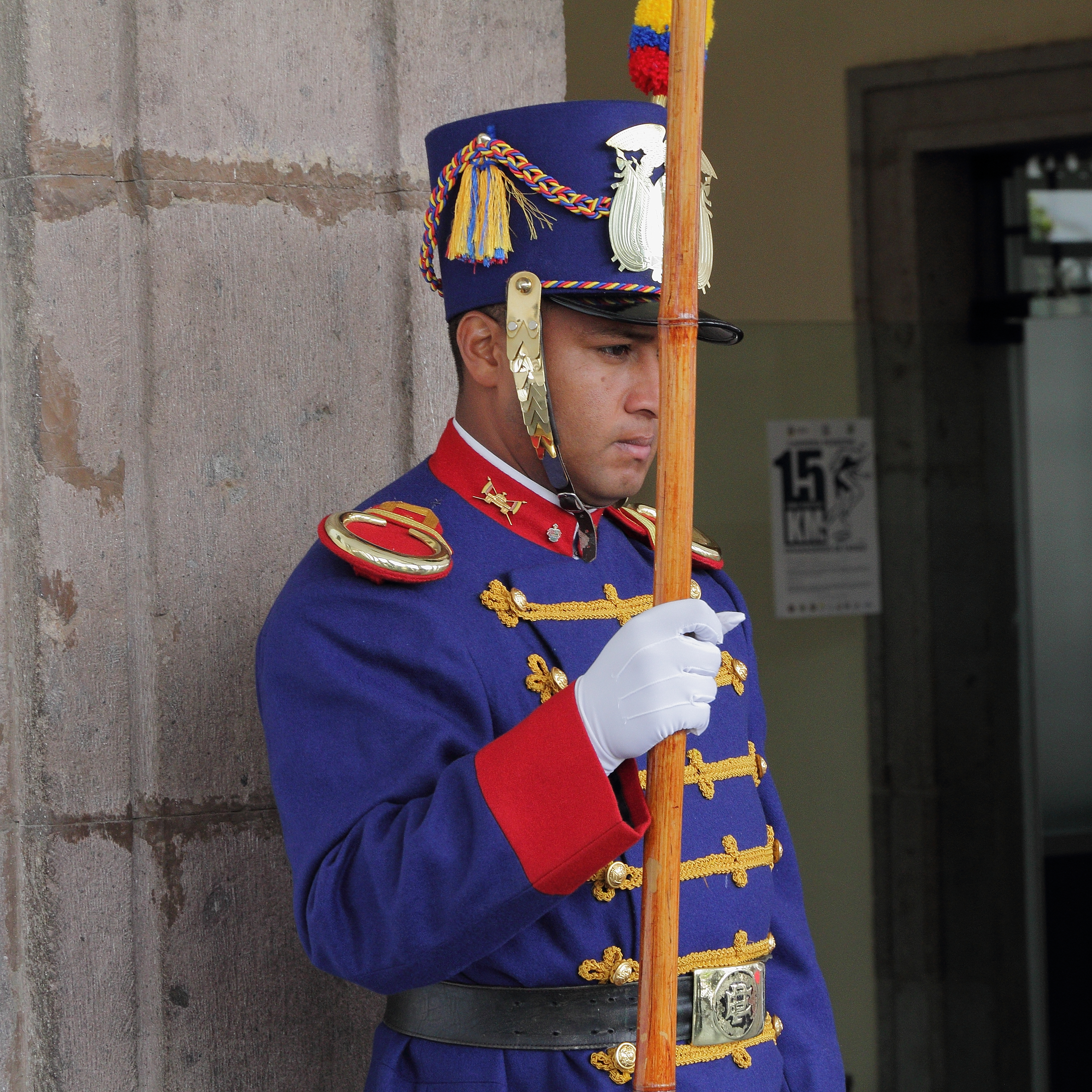

== See also ==
- Guard of honour
- President of Ecuador
- Armed Forces of Ecuador
- Carondelet Palace
