= Battle of Tarqui =

1829 battle between Colombia and Peru

Battle of Portete de Tarqui
- Part of the Gran Colombia–Peru War
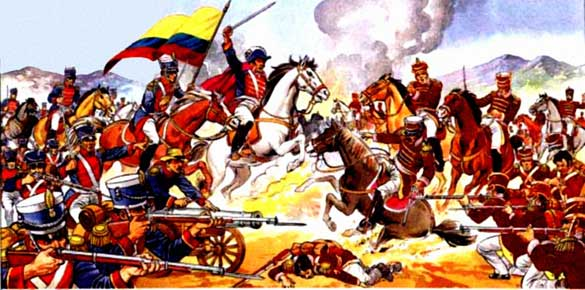
- Painting of the battle
Date	27 February 1829
Location	Portete de Tarqui (today Ecuador)
Result	Gran Colombian victory

Belligerents
Gran Colombia	Peru

Commanders and leaders
Antonio de Sucre; Juan José Flores	José de la Mar; Agustín Gamarra

Units involved
Gran Colombian Army: Granaderos de Tarqui; Cavalry Squadron "Cedeño"	Peruvian Army: 1st "Hussars of Junín" Cavalry Regiment

Strength
5,000 men	5,000 men

Casualties and losses
2,000 displaced 800 killed & wounded 600 deserted & captured	1,000 killed & wounded 300 captured

The Battle of Tarqui, also known as the Battle of Portete de Tarqui, took place on 27 February 1829 at Tarqui, near Cuenca, today part of Ecuador. It was fought between troops from Gran Colombia, commanded by Antonio José de Sucre, and Peruvian troops under José de La Mar. Although the Colombian troops achieved victory over the Peruvian vanguard, destroying it and forcing the rest of their forces to withdraw, they suffered heavy losses in their cavalry with the Peruvian charge, which made it difficult to continue the campaign and caused the stabilization of the front.

For this reason, Sucre and La Mar signed an armistice in Girón, a prelude to the negotiation of the end of hostilities and the establishment of limits between the two countries. However, the breach of the agreement almost led to a continuation of the war, an event that was prevented by the political instability in Peru that led to the deposition of La Mar by Agustín Gamarra. The new Peruvian president negotiated the signing of the peace treaty with Colombia, known as the Treaty of Guayaquil. At the same time, however, events were taking place that would lead to the dissolution of Gran Colombia.

The anniversary of the battle is conmemorated as Army Day by the Ecuadorian Army.

== Prelude ==
Relations between Gran Colombia and Peru had deteriorated alarmingly. On the one hand, certain Peruvian sectors distrusted former dictator Bolívar's intentions towards the country and, in some cases, were openly hostile to him after his dictatorship in Peru, a fact that had forced him to leave Lima in 1826. Bolivar's Gran Colombian Army had participated in the Peruvian War of Independence, and Bolívar himself had expressed a desire to unite both Peru and Bolivia into a new federated state, with Bolivarian governments established in both Gran Colombia and Bolivia, something with La Mar saw unfavorable, as it was his desire to unite Lower and Upper Peru into a single Peruvian state. On the other hand, both Bolívar and his supporters resented these attitudes and reignited the debate regarding the Peruvian town of Tumbes and the disputed territories of Jaén and Maynas.

The incident that unleashed the events was the Peruvian intervention in the overthrow of the pro-Bolívar government in Bolivia in mid-1828. Peruvian President José de La Mar then received authorization from the Congress of Peru to march to confront the Gran Colombian Army. La Mar himself had been born in Cuenca, and was encouraged by influential citizens of Guayaquil to believe that the people of "el Austro" (Note: The term refers to the southern region of what is now Ecuador, including Cuenca, Guayaquil and Loja.) would prefer to be part of Peru rather than Gran Colombia.

Peru planned and executed an extensive but successful naval blockade of the Gran Colombian coasts, between the current south of Ecuador and the southern coasts of Panama, which prevented the use of the naval units of Gran Colombia in the Pacific. The Peruvian naval campaign culminated in the takeover of the main port that Gran Colombia had in the Pacific Ocean, Guayaquil, on February 1, 1829. The Peruvian Army, for its part, initially had rapid and successful military campaigns.

On November 28, 1828, La Mar entered Colombian territory and occupied Loja and almost the entire department of Azuay; later, La Mar also occupied Guayaquil, evacuated by Colombian general Juan Illingworth while waiting for reinforcements. Bogota was by now finally angry by what La Mar did to the Ecuadorian people. Given the situation, Antonio José de Sucre, then back in Quito after resigning the Bolivian presidency, and Juan José Flores, governor of the department of Ecuador, concentrated the army of southern Colombia near Cuenca to pressure the Peruvian troops, who had occupied the area on February 10, 1829.

== Battle ==
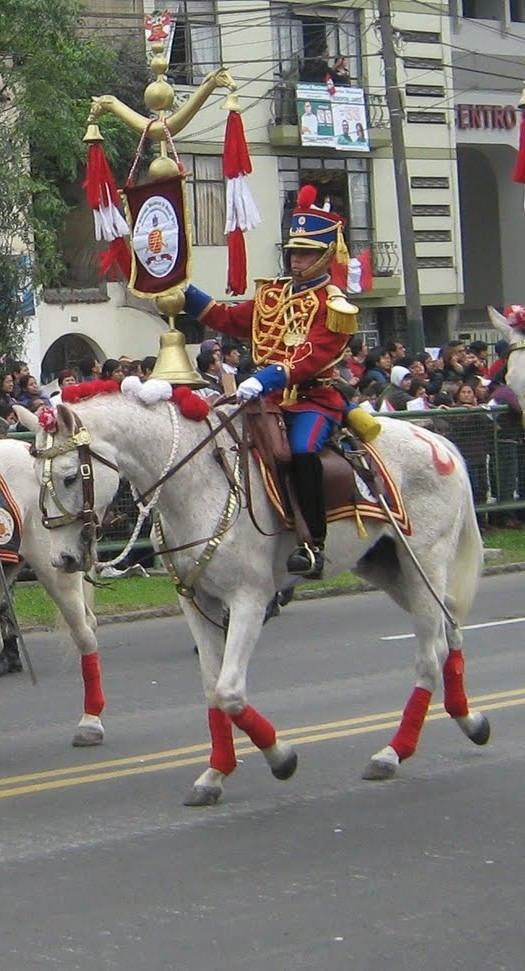
1st "Hussars of Junin" Cavalry Regiment, which participated in the battle.

The President of Gran Colombia, Simón Bolívar appointed Mariscal Sucre, then President of Bolivia, to lead the Gran Colombian troops to defend the "Department of Ecuador." Helping Sucre was the Governor of the Department of Ecuador, Juan José Flores. Together Sucre and Flores recruited an estimated 5,000 troops by January 1829 and brought them into the area near Cuenca by the middle of February.

Lamar also had an estimated Peruvian 4,500 troops in the vicinity of Cuenca. The two armies were set to confront in Portete de Tarqui with the victory of the Grancolombian troops, in the first part of the battle, including an infantry brigade consisting of 3 battalions and a cavalry squadron under COL José María Camacaro, serving as part of the cavalry brigade under MGEN Daniel Florence O'Leary.

During the second part of the battle the Colonel's death in the battle by the 1st Squadron, Junin Hussars Regiment commanding officer, COL Luis Jose de Orbegoso y Moncada, who served with then LTCOL Domingo Nieto (later a Marshal) under the leadership of the Argentine general Mariano Necochea, shocked the Colombian forces so much that a cavalry charge was ordered, resulting in the Colombian forces (the Cedeño Squadron and two companies of riflemen) leading yet again into the offensive, but the Junin Hussars blocked them, forcing them to fall back to the line. By sunset the Peruvian forces pulled back, awaiting reinforcements.

== Aftermath ==
The Girón Agreement was signed in the aftermath of the battle by the general officers of both forces. The war had an abrupt end with a coup on the morning of June 7, 1829 by General Agustín Gamarra against the government of President La Mar, who had recently returned to Peru and was subsequently exiled to Costa Rica, where he died in November 1830. With La Mar overthrown, the way was paved for the celebration of peace between Peru and Gran Colombia. General Agustín Gamarra, already provisional president of Peru, gave instructions in this regard. Both parties signed the Piura Armistice on July 10, 1829, by which a 60-day armistice was agreed, as well as the return of Guayaquil to Gran Colombia and the suspension of the Peruvian blockade of the Pacific coast of Gran Colombia and the withdrawal of Peruvian troops, among other agreements.

After the signing of the Piura Armistice, the Peruvian government delivered the port of Guayaquil back to Gran Colombia on July 20. Later, it was signed in the Treaty of Guayaquil, on September 22, 1829, by the Peruvian José Larrea y Loredo and the Colombian Pedro Gual, considered the first border treaty between the two countries. According to the treaty, Peru kept Tumbes, Jaén and Maynas and Gran Colombia kept Guayaquil. In other words, the status quo ante bellum was maintained, adding that each country could make small concessions in order to establish a more natural and exact dividing line to avoid new conflicts. Likewise, it was agreed to appoint a binational Boundary Commission, to set the dividing line later. The Guayaquil Treaty was ratified by the Congress of Peru and by Simón Bolívar. Larrea and Gual had six meetings in total, between September 16 and 22, 1829, the day the treaty was signed.

Sucre was killed in 1830 while riding on his way back to Quito, and Juan José Flores became the first President of Ecuador.

In honor of the Ecuadorians fallen in the battle, the Presidential Horse Guards Squadron of the Ecuadorian Army has the nickname "Tarqui Grenadiers" in honor of the battle, as a horse grenadier unit served with the Colombian army during the battle and was manned partly by Ecuadorian personnel. They wear a blue dress uniform and carry lances in memory of their fallen predecessors.

=== Girón Agreement ===
Girón Agreement
- Disputed territory between Colombia and Peru
- Type: Peace treaty
- Drafted: 27 February 1829
- Signed: 27–28 February 1829
- Location: Girón
- Signatories: Colombia; Peru

Full text
- :es:Convenio de Girón at Wikisource

The Girón Agreement, also known as the Girón Treaty, was the first agreement signed on February 27, 1829 as a consequence of the battle in Tarqui. After the battle, General José de La Mar signed the treaty on February 28 but did not vacate Guayaquil, arguing that he considered it humiliating that Sucre ordered a column to be erected on the battlefield that would read in gold letters the following:

The Peruvian army of eight thousand soldiers that invaded the land of their liberators was defeated by four thousand brave men from Colombia on February twenty-seven, eighteen-hundred and twenty-nine.

La Mar protested in a letter addressed to Sucre from Gonzamaná and suspended the agreement until the insults were withdrawn, being willing to renew it only then. Although Bolívar mockingly described them as "old-fashioned complaints," La Mar was willing to continue the war if the corresponding revisions were not made. Furthermore, he argued that the treaty had to be ratified by Congress for it to enter into force.

==== Treaty ====
The treaty contained the following points:

1. The Peruvian Army must vacate all the territories of the state of Quito.

2. The removal of troops must take place on March 2, 1829 and end within the non-extendable period of 20 days.
3. In the definitive Treaty, which must be celebrated in Guayaquil, all the claims of Peru and Colombia will be resolved.
4. Guayaquil must be vacated, lifting the northern blockade.
5. For border issues, the principle of uti possidetis iure of 1810 will be taken as a basis.

=== Piura Armistice ===
Piura Armistice
- Type: Armistice
- Signed: 10 July 1829
- Location: Piura
- Signatories: Colombia; Peru

The Piura Armistice was the armistice agreed by both Gran Colombia and Peru in the aftermath of the Gran Colombia–Peru War. The treaty was signed by General Agustín Gamarra in the aftermath of a coup against president José de la Mar on June 7 of the same year.

==== Armistice ====
After the coup against President La Mar, the new de facto government of Gamarra travelled to Piura where he called for an immediate cessation of military activities and signed the Armistice with Gran-Colombian General Juan José Flores. This new armistice was intended to restore peace between the two new countries. The treaty also implied the recognition of the annexation of Guayaquil to Colombia, while the rest of the border was to be determined by both parties.

== See also ==
- Battle of La Pedrera

== Bibliography ==
- Dupuy, R. E. and T. N. Dupuy. The Encyclopedia of Military History. (Philadelphia: Harper and Roe, 1986) p. 818
