= Punta Malpelo =

Coordinates: 3.5005°S 80.4920°W

Punta Malpelo is a point in Peru near the border with Ecuador. It was a significant scene during the Gran Colombia-Peru War, because on August 31, 1828, was the site of the Battle of Punta Malpelo, where the Peruvian corvette Libertad sustained a naval encounter with the Gran Colombian ships Pichincha and Guayaquileña with high casualties on both sides.
