= Martin George Guisse =

British naval officer

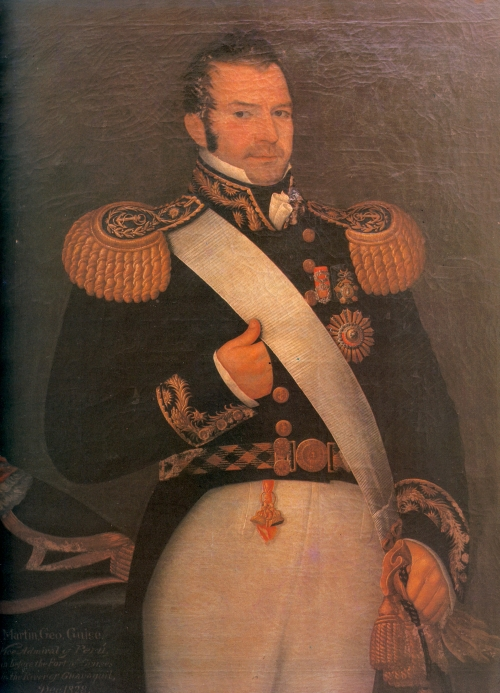
- Vicealmirante Guisse
- Born: Martin George Guise; 12 March 1780; Gloucestershire, England
- Died: 23 November 1828 (aged 48); Guayaquil, Ecuador
- Burial place: Panteón de los Próceres, Lima, Peru
- Military career
- Allegiance: United Kingdom; Republic of Chile; Republic of Peru
- Branch: Royal Navy; Chilean Navy; Peruvian Navy
- Conflicts: French Revolutionary Wars; Napoleonic Wars; Battle of Trafalgar; War of 1812; Peruvian War of Independence; Gran Colombia–Peru War

Martin George Guisse, born Martin George Guise (12 March 1780 – 23 November 1828), and later known as Jorge Martín Guisse in Spanish, was a British naval officer who served in Royal Navy in the French Revolutionary and Napoleonic Wars. He later served in the Chilean Navy during the Peruvian War of Independence and, as Vice-Admiral, in the Peruvian Navy in the Gran Colombia–Peru War, during which he was killed.

== Biography ==
He was a younger son of Sir John Guise, 1st Baronet, of Elmore Court, Gloucester, and Elizabeth Wright, and joined the Royal Navy, receiving a commission as a lieutenant on 6 March 1801, and taking part in the Battle of Trafalgar in October 1805. He commanded the 14-gun brig Liberty between 1811 and 1813, which captured the American ship Freeman on 29 July 1812. Guisse was promoted to commander 29 March 1815.

When Guisse heard of the South American wars of independence he resigned from the Navy, bought his own ship, HMS Hecate, and set sail never to return to Britain. He arrived in Buenos Aires and quickly came to an agreement with Lord Cochrane to join the Chilean Navy. Guisse's role in the battles that followed was significant, in spite of frequent, bitter disagreements with Cochrane. (Note: Cochrane is highly critical of Guisse, once accusing him, along with Captains Spry and Worcester, of forming a "cabal" against him.) It was his contribution to the attack on the Spanish Esmeralda in Callao that made its capture possible.

After the war and in poor health, he retired to Miraflores, Lima where he married the young Limenian, Juana Valle Riestra. But his civilian life was short. When Gran Colombia–Peru War broke out in 1828, he was asked to take command of the Peruvian Navy. Appointed Vice-Admiral, his fleet captured Guayaquil but he was killed by a sniper during the battle.

His body was brought to Callao in honour and he was buried there in the clothes of a Franciscan friar. In 1926 his remains were transferred to the Panteón de los Próceres.

One of the four houses of Markham College, Lima, is named in his honour, as is Liceo Naval Almirante Guisse, a school founded in 1964 for the children of Peruvian naval officers.

Guisse was the grandfather of Peruvian aviator George Chavez.

== See also ==
- Guise baronets
