= Gran Colombia–Peru War =

War between Colombia and Peru

Gran Colombian–Peruvian War
- Part of the Colombian–Peruvian territorial dispute and Ecuadorian–Peruvian territorial dispute
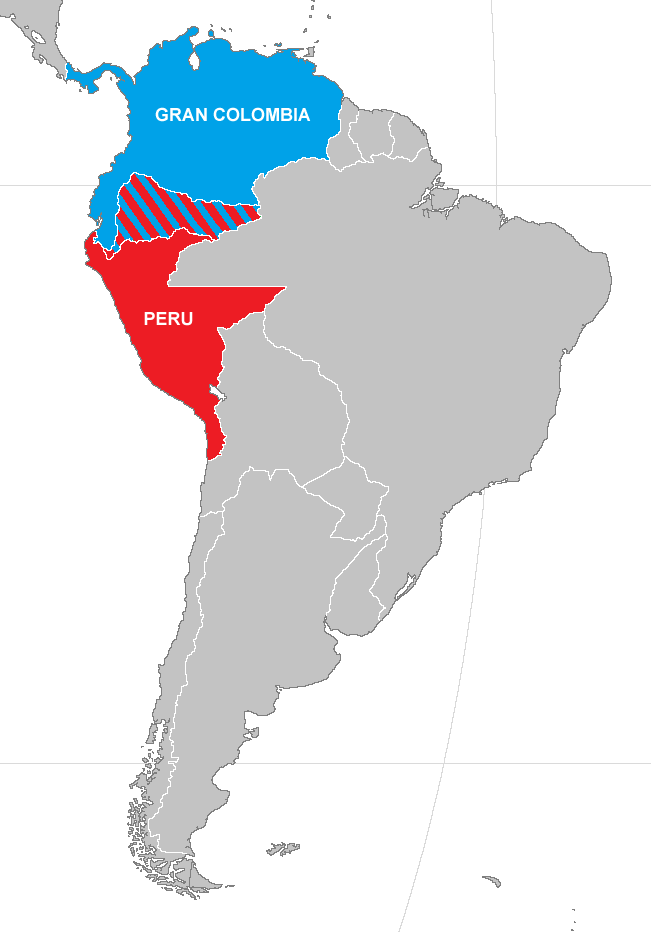
- Map of Colombia (blue) and Peru (red) in 1828, with the disputed territory in striped colours
Date	20 May 1828 – 22 September 1829
Location	Guayaquil, Ecuador, Jaén, Azuay and Maynas
Result	Stalemate; Larrea-Gual Treaty
Territorial changes	Status quo ante bellum

Belligerents
Gran Colombia	Peru

Commanders and leaders
(Gran Colombia) Antonio José de Sucre (Gran Colombia) Juan José Flores (Gran Colombia) Simón Bolívar (Gran Colombia) Rafael Urdaneta	(Peru) José de la Mar (Peru) Agustín Gamarra

Units involved
Gran Colombian Army: British Legions; Gran Colombian Navy	Peruvian Army: Guayaquilans volunteers; Peruvian Navy

Strength
4,600 men 1 corvette 4 schooners brigantines several gunboats (at the start)	7,500 men 2 frigates 1 corvette 1 brigantine 2 schooners 8 gunboats (at the start)

Casualties and losses
4,100 casualties 2 schooners destroyed several gunboats destroyed	3,500 casualties 1 frigate lost

The Gran Colombian–Peruvian War (Spanish: Guerra grancolombo-peruana) of 1828 and 1829 was the first international conflict fought by the Republic of Peru, which had gained its independence from Spain in 1821, and Gran Colombia, that existed between 1819 and 1830.

== Causes ==
The issues that led to war were Gran Colombian claims, dating from colonial times, concerning control of the territories of Jaén and Maynas. The Royal Audience of Quito (Spanish: Real Audiencia de Quito) was established in 1563 by a royal decree of the King of Spain. Its territories included, to the north, Pasto, Popayán, Cali, Buenaventura, and Buga in what is now Colombia. The Royal Audience of Quito was initially part of the Viceroyalty of Peru until 1717, when it became part of the Viceroyalty of New Granada. Borders at the time were imprecise, especially in the eastern unsettled areas, beyond the Andean cordillera, because of a lack of geographical knowledge and the low importance accorded to these unpopulated and largely inaccessible territories.

The first controversy between the Viceroyalty of Peru and the Real Audiencia de Quito erupted in 1802, when the military and ecclesiastic administration of Maynas was transferred to the Viceroyalty of Peru by royal decree. To this day, there is some dispute as to whether this was a territorial concession as well. This lack of clarity formed the basis for territorial disputes between Ecuador and Peru when, a few years later, these two nations obtained their independence from Spain. Jaén and Tumbez were not included in this royal decree of 1802.

A similar event occurred in 1803, when the Spanish crown decided that the military affairs of the Province of Guayaquil, whose capital was the port city of the same name, would be run from Lima, Peru. Further, in 1810, all administrative and economic affairs for the Province of Guayaquil were turned over to the Viceroyalty of Peru, a situation that would endure until 1819 (and the formation of Gran Colombia, which included Guayaquil.)

== Uti possidetis juris ==
Even before the battles for the freedom of the South American colonies were over, Simón Bolívar established the uti possidetis juris principle as the basis for the territorial demarcation of the new nation-states that were to be born of the ancient colonial jurisdictions. In essence, the principle, as it applied to the international borders of that time, meant that the borders of the new countries should correspond to the Spanish administrative borders as they were in 1809. This presented considerable difficulty due to a lack of geographical knowledge, and also because much of the territory in question was unpopulated (or sparsely populated) and unexplored. According to the principle, the territory of the Viceroyalty of Lima would then become part of Peru, and the territory of the Viceroyalty of New Granada part of Colombia. However, much of what would become Ecuador fell into a "gray area" with plausible claims by both Peru (successor to the Viceroyalty of Peru) and Colombia (successor to the Viceroyalty of New Granada) still in conflict.

== Conflict over Bolivia ==
The federation of Gran Colombia, formed in 1819, was the kernel of Bolívar's grander scheme to unite the former Spanish colonies in Central and South America. Prior to becoming the titular head of Gran Colombia, Bolívar had been, briefly, the president of the newly independent state of Bolivia, his namesake. Bolivia had formerly been a part of the Viceroyalty of the "Rio de La Plata", known as Upper Peru, and, once Bolívar relinquished the presidency of Bolivia to his revolutionary compatriot, Antonio José de Sucre Alcalá, in 1826, the Peruvians saw an opportunity. Early in 1828, Peru launched a campaign against Bolivia to end the Bolivarian influence where it finally forced Colombians to leave Bolivia.

== Initial engagements ==
Furious about the news from Bolivia (that the Colombian army had been expelled), President Bolívar resolved to declare war against Peru on 3 June 1828. Antonio José de Sucre, who had been the President of Bolivia since 1826, resigned his office (under duress) and was appointed Commander of the Gran Colombian Army.

The declaration of war occurred on July 3, 1828, when President José de La Mar and President Simón Bolívar ordered mobilizations of their land and naval forces. The first confrontation of the conflict took place on August 31 of that year in the Malpelo naval battle, which ended with a Peruvian victory when the Peruvian corvette Libertad, under the command of Carlos García del Postigo, patrolled in international waters west of the Gulf of Guayaquil. The Peruvian corvette blocked that port, but was attacked by the Gran Colombian ships, Pichincha and Guayaquileña, in Punta Malpelo. The Colombians were forced to retire with great loss of life on board their ships.

Then, on November 22, 1828, the Naval Combat of Cruces happened. This naval confrontation took place between the Peruvian ships Presidente, Libertad and Peruviana and the Gran Colombians Guayaquileña and Adela during the Great Colombian-Peruvian War. The blockade of Guayaquil by the Navy of Peru was decisive in gaining maritime superiority and marks the end of the naval campaign of the war.

== Assault on Guayaquil ==
The Peruvian squadron, commanded by Admiral Martin George Guisse, made a number of raids in the area of Guayaquil before directly attacking the defenses of that city from 22 November to 24 November 1828. In this campaign, he managed to eliminate the Colombian defenses afloat and to silence much of the enemy artillery, but, on the night of 23 November, the Peruvian frigate Presidente ran aground, and the Colombians took advantage of the situation to counterattack.

At dawn, with the arrival of high tide, the frigate was refloated under fire. One of the last enemy sniper shots hit Guisse, mortally wounding him. Control of the squadron was assumed by his first lieutenant, José Boterín, who continued the siege. The city finally surrendered on 19 January 1829. After this victory, the corvette Arequipeña and the brig Congreso repaired to Panama to rescue a Peruvian merchant ship that had been captured by the Gran Colombians. Guayaquil would remain under Peruvian occupation until 21 July 1829.

== Land war ==
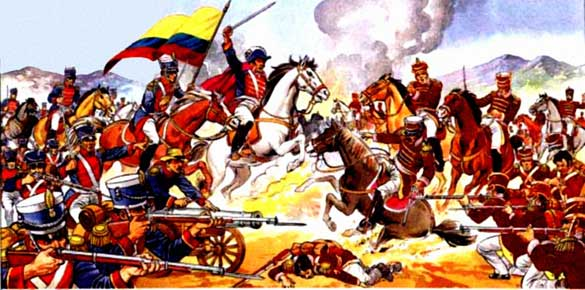
Illustration of the Battle of Porte de Tarqui

Peruvian President José de La Mar had been born in the city of Cuenca, in present-day Ecuador, which was, in 1828, part of the disputed territory and de facto part of Gran Colombia. Shortly after the Peruvian Navy's siege of Guayaquil was concluded, the Peruvian Army seized the city of Loja after the surprise attack on Saraguro on the 13 February 1829, and then it pushed north into Guayas, the district surrounding the city of Guayaquil. En route, forces under La Mar and General Agustín Gamarra occupied Cuenca as well.

Holding Cuenca was, however, short-lived. The Venezuelan general, Antonio José de Sucre, and his compatriot, General Juan José Flores, mounted a counterattack and defeated the Peruvians near the city of Cuenca, at the Battle of Portete de Tarqui on the 26 February and the 27 February 1829.

It is necessary to point out that at the Battle of the Portete de Tarqui, only one advance guard of the Peruvian troops was beaten. The 900 Peruvian infantry had been surrounded by the entire Grancolombian army of more than 4,500 men. The bulk of the Peruvian forces remained intact and managed to retreat in order and form their divisions in the plain with their cavalry and artillery at the exit of the gorge, pending a new confrontation with the army of Gran Colombia. The results of this battle were not decisive.

Without reinforcement by land, the Peruvian occupation of Guayaquil was destined to fail, but the Gran Colombia's assertion of rights to the territories of Jaén and Maynas was similarly frustrated. On the 28 February 1829, La Mar and Sucre signed a conditioning document that became known as the La Mar-Sucre Convention.

La Mar, however, refused to give back Guayaquil or withdraw the Peruvian Navy, points that were part of the convention. La Mar proceeded to strengthen his army at his headquarters at Piura while Bolívar prepared to take command of the Colombian army, and hostilities seemed about to restart.

== Aftermath ==
The Girón Agreement between Peru and Gran Colombia recognized as borders the "same ones as the corresponding Viceroyalties before independence." Since this status quo ante solution was based on borders that had never been adequately defined, future territorial disputes between Peru and Ecuador and Colombia were virtually inevitable.

On 10 July 1829, the Armistice of Piura recognised the annexation of Guayaquil to Gran Colombia, and the Gran Colombia recognized Tumbes, Jaén and Maynas as Peruvian territories. On September 22 of that year, the war between Peru and Gran Colombia officially came to an end when the armistice was ratified. A formal peace treaty, known as the Larrea-Gual Treaty or the Gual-Larrea Treaty, was signed on the very same day, September 22, 1829. The uti possidetis principle was affirmed, but the text also acknowledged that small concessions by each side may become desirable in order to define a "more natural and precise border", which was the basis for avoiding further conflict. The parties agreed to form a binational commission to establish a permanent border.

=== Gran Colombia a nation or a confederation? ===
The term Gran Colombia is used today to refer to the federation that was formed between the Republics of Ecuador, Venezuela, Colombia and Panama before 1830. However, Gran Colombia is, in a sense, an artificial term, as the country was always referred to simply as Colombia. This is clear to anyone who examines the many treaties signed between Colombia and Peru before 1830.

In Peru, however, the dissolution of Gran Colombia is seen as a country ceasing to exist, giving way to the formation of new nation-states. The significance of this view is that the treaties Peru had signed with Gran Colombia became void when the countersignatory ceased to exist. The three new states, the Republic of New Granada (which later changed its name to Republic of Colombia), the Republic of Venezuela, and the Republic of Ecuador, in the Peruvian view, started with a clean diplomatic slate.

An alternative view is that Ecuador and Venezuela separated from the Gran Colombia Federation and inherited all of the treaty obligations that Gran Colombia had assumed, at least to the extent that they apply to their respective territories. There are indications that Colombia itself maintained this position, because clearly, Gran Colombia and its successor state, the Republic of Colombia, shared a capital city, a subset of the same territory, and much the same citizenry. It would be unnatural to disavow their common histories.

The question of the status of treaties and accords dating to the revolutionary period (1809–1819) and Gran Colombia period (1819–1830) has a profound effect on international relations to the present day.

=== Pedemonte-Mosquera Protocol ===
To illustrate the current relevance of the Gran Colombia–Peru War, Ecuador asserts that there was an agreement signed in Lima between the foreign ministers of Peru and Gran Colombia on 11 August 1830. Known as the Pedemonte-Mosquera protocol, the agreement, based on the military result at the Battle of Portete de Tarqui and the Gual-Learra Treaty then in effect, settled the placement of the border between the two nations definitively and for all time.

Ecuador has used the Pedemonte-Mosquera Protocol as its primary legal support for land claims against Peru. However, Peru disputes its credibility and its very existence. Peru notes that the original document has never been produced by Colombia or by Ecuador. Peru also claims that there is evidence that Pedemonte and Mosquera were not even in the same place on the day in question, so they could not possibly have concluded any agreement at all. It also states that in the supposed date of signing of the protocol (11 August 1830), Pedemonte was no longer chancellor (August 9) and Mosquera had embarked on the schooner Guayaquileña on the 10th. Further, according to Peru, the protocol, if it did exist, was never ratified by either country's congress. Besides, to the Peruvian way of thinking, even if the protocol was signed, the Gran Colombia Federation had been effectively dissolved well before 11 August 1830, so any agreement concluded on that day was undertaken by a man without portfolio, that is, a diplomat representing no nation at all. (Ecuador was born as a country on 13 May 1830 and began its separate existence with the adoption of a Constitution on 23 September 1830.)

Even though it is unlikely that Ecuador might have concocted a historical treaty of this nature, the Peruvian arguments cannot be dismissed out of hand. However, considering the uti possidetis juris principle Ecuador would maintain the borders ratified right before Gran Colombia's dissolution.

Ecuador has produced a copy of the Pedemonte-Mosquera protocol, made in 1870, that the Colombian embassy in Lima sent to Bogotá. The copy in question was obtained from a diplomat's personal collection. However, it has not been satisfactorily authenticated, and it remains in dispute.

The Mosquera-Pedemonte protocol is mentioned in a Colombian document titled Legislative Act No. 3, published 31 October 1910. This document explains how the borders between Colombia and its neighbors had been established. With respect to its border with Peru, it indicates that the borders are "those adopted by Mosquera-Pedemonte, in development of the treaty of 22 September 1829."
