= Battle of Punta Malpelo =

1828 Gran Columbia-Peru War naval battle

Coordinates: 3.5005°S 80.4920°W

- Part of Gran Colombia–Peru War
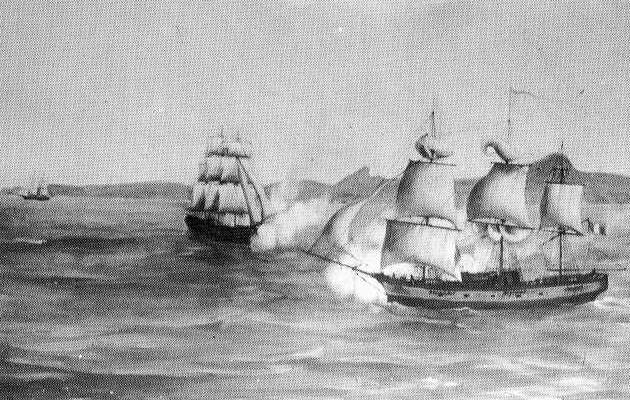
- A painting depicting the naval battle of Malpelo, from the collection of the Peruvian Naval Museum
Date	31 August 1828
Location	Punta Malpelo, near Guayaquil
Result	Peruvian victory

Belligerents
Gran Colombia	Peru

Commanders and leaders
(Gran Colombia) Claudio Johnston (Gran Colombia) Archibald Taylor (surrendered)	(Peru) Carlos García del Postigo

Strength
1 corvette 1 schooner	1 corvette

Casualties and losses
(Gran Colombia) 60 killed & wounded (Gran Colombia) 1 corvette captured	(Peru) 43 killed & wounded

The Battle of Punta Malpelo was a naval encounter between a Peruvian corvette and two Gran Colombian vessels on 31 August 1828, near the port of Guayaquil, and was the first major combat of the Peruvian Navy as an independent force of the newborn Peruvian nation.

== Background ==
In June 1828, Gran Colombia declared a state of war on Peru under allegations that it had fomented a rebellion against Colombian forces in Bolivia. Gran Colombia's leader, Simon Bolivar, also demanded the payment of a debt of several million pesos resulting from the Peruvian War of Independence; and the cession of the northern provinces of Jaén and Maynas. The consequent Peruvian declaration of war against Gran Colombia occurred on 3 July 1828 when the Peruvian government, under President Jose de La Mar, ordered a mobilization of its ground and naval forces.

== Battle ==
On 2 July 1828, the Peruvian corvette Libertad armed with 24 guns and a crew of 124 men under Captain Carlos Garcia del Postigo (a Chilean-born officer under the service of the Peruvian Navy), sailed towards Guayaquil with orders to cross the Gulf and guard the entrance to the Guayaquil River. On 31 August 1828, the Peruvian vessel was intercepted by two Gran-Colombian warships, the schooner Guayaquileña and the corvette Pichincha, commanded by Irish-born Captain Thomas C. Wright. Captain Wright, aboard the Guayaquileña, inquired to the commander of Libertad about his activities in Gran-Colombian waters, but suddenly the Peruvian corvette opened fire, starting a close-quarter artillery duel, during which the Peruvians almost boarded the Guayaquileña; meanwhile, the Pichincha stayed away and didn't participate in the combat. At the peak of the struggle, the Gran-Colombians ships suddenly retreated towards Guayaquil and were pursued closely by the Libertad. The pursuit ceased when the Libertad was forced to return to tend the wounded and bury the dead. The Peruvians lost 15 killed and 28 wounded, while the Gran-Colombians suffered 24 killed and 36 wounded.

=== Ships involved ===
The Libertad was a corvette originally named General Brown, purchased from Chile in January 1826 for 25 thousand pesos under the name General Salom, that started its service for the Peruvian Navy as a transport vessel, and on 6 March 1827 was finally named Libertad. On 8 January 1828, the Commander-in-Chief of the Peruvian Navy, Rear Admiral José Pascual de Vivero, established a budget of 7,354 pesos to convert the Libertad into a warship, initially armed with 22 12-pounder guns taken from the corvette Limeña. On 14 May 1828 the Chilean officer Carlos García del Postigo Búlnes was assigned as commander of the vessel.

The schooner Guayaquileña was armed with twelve 12-pounder guns, and was under the command of Lieutenant Claudio Johnston. Among the officers on board were two future Ecuadorian presidents, ensign José María Urvina and midshipman Francisco Robles. The Pichincha was under the command of Captain Archibald Taylor.

== Aftermath ==
After this encounter the Peruvian Navy, composed at that time of 16 warships and transports, among them the frigate Presidente, started a naval blockade ordered by the Peruvian government on 19 September 1828, of the entire Gran Colombian Pacific coasts. This was from Machala (Ecuador) to Panama. Thanks to this action the Gran Colombian Navy was unable to use its main ports in the Pacific.

== Bibliography ==
- Restrepo, José Manuel (1858). "Chapter XIV". Historia de la revolución de la República de Colombia en la América Meridional (in Spanish). Vol. Tome IV (1st ed.). Grand-Rue nº 14, Bezasón: Imprenta de José Jacquin. p. 145.
- "La Marina de Guerra en la República Siglo XIX". Peruvian Navy Website (in Spanish). Archived from the original on 2009-09-17.
- "1828: The Navy in action: The War with Gran Colombia". Juan del Carpio. Archived from the original on 2003-01-21.
