= Peruvian–Bolivian War of 1828 =

First Peruvian invasion of Bolivia
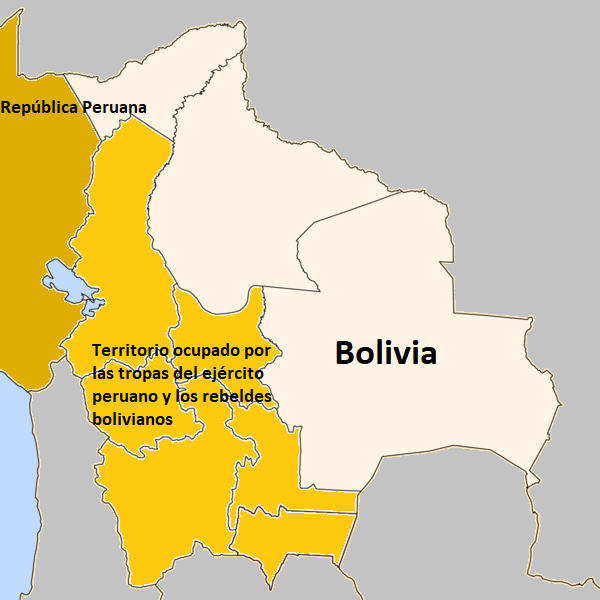
- Territory occupied by Peru during the conflict
Date	1 May – 8 September 1828
Location	Bolivia
Result	Peruvian victory; Establishment of the Second Republic of Alto Peru.; End of Gran Colombian influence in Bolivia.; Start the Gran Colombian-Peruvian War.
Territorial changes	More of 65% of Bolivia occupied by the Peruvian Army

Belligerents
Bolivia; Gran Colombia	Peru: Alto Perú

Commanders and leaders
(Gran Colombia) Antonio J. de Sucre (surrendered) / (WIA)/ (POW); José de Urdininea (surrendered); Francisco de Quiroga (surrendered)	(Peru) José de La Mar (Peru) Agustín Gamarra (Bolivia) Pedro Blanco Soto (Peru) Blas Cerdeña (Peru) Manuel de Aparicio

Strength
~3,500–4,500 soldiers	4,000–4,500 soldiers

Casualties and losses
(Gran Colombia) 3,500–6,000 (surrendered)	None loses

The Peruvian–Bolivian War of 1828, First Peruvian invasion of Bolivia or First Peruvian intervention in Bolivia (Note: Known also as the first Peruvian intervention in Bolivia in Peru, or the first Peruvian invasion of Bolivia in Bolivia) was an invasion of Bolivia by Peru headed by Agustín Gamarra in the form of a foreign intervention in an internal conflict in the Republic of Bolivia, being the first important war in the new country, just three years after becoming independent, and endangering its autonomy as a result of the occupation. Its objective was to force the departure of the troops of the Republic of Colombia from Bolivia, the resignation of Antonio José de Sucre, and the prevention of the opening of a southern front in the event of a war with Colombia. (Note: The term Colombia will be used in this article to refer to the former Gran Colombia) The intervention escalated tensions further, culminating in the Gran Colombia–Peru War.

== Background ==
=== Peruvian independence and the Bolivarian regime ===
The Peruvian aristocracy (Note: The aristocracy is described as a group of descendants of the Spanish, whose territorial ties and estates contributed to creating a property feudal in character. They despised industrial work and left their large estates in the charge of mestizo butlers who visited to rest or inspect. They lived relaxed in their large houses in Lima, Trujillo, Huánuco or Arequipa, dedicated to living in the living room without participating in politics.) was not inclined toward war and was loyal to the Crown because it recognized its privileges and felt a connection toward it. A race war like the one from 1780 was also feared. The nobility quickly supported the viceroy when the rebellions of Huánuco and Cuzco, started by Creoles, were subsequently under the direction of indigenous people.

Because of this, all political alternatives came from regions relatively marginal to Madrid, such as Buenos Aires or Caracas. Only foreign interference could create serious projects of independence. Its declaration was the product of an agreement between the invading patriots and the Peruvian royalists, thus it was foreigners who led the movement, and therefore failed in the formation of an organic "revolutionary state", which delayed for years the possibility of Peruvians to organize their own institutional project. As it turned out, the reality of these wars of independence saw itself play out as a civil war between a minority of patriots supported by foreign troops and a royalist majority.

On September 20, 1822, after meeting in Guayaquil with Simón Bolívar, José de San Martín resigned his position and was succeeded by a junta. This junta was soon delegitimized by its defeats in the battles of Moquegua and Torata. The Constituent Congress that was convened was composed of representatives elected in an undemocratic way and with little legitimacy as the majority of the population was still under realistic control. All this led to the coup of Santa Cruz on January 27, 1823, that made José de la Riva Agüero president of Peru.

Republican Peru, still at war with the royalists who resisted in Cuzco under the orders of Viceroy José de la Serna, was immersed in a chaotic period in which not even the reinforcements of the major general, Antonio José de Sucre, could prevent the setbacks. military. The various pro-independence currents were confronted: the increasingly weak San Martín monarchism, the plebeian, liberal and parliamentary republicanism (José Faustino Sánchez Carrión, Francisco Javier Mariátegui y Tellería and Francisco Xavier de Luna Pizarro), the nationalist and militarist republicanism led by Riva Agüero and the Bolivarian confederation project. Of these, the one with the most support was Luna Pizarro, who wanted a democratic Peru, progressive and free of Spaniards, Colombians and Argentines. He opposed San Martin's monarchism, caudillista militarism and Bolivarian projects.

Finally, Congress requested Bolívar's personal intervention in the country on June 19. Previously, the Aid Agreement was signed on March 18 between Juan Paz del Castillo and Mariano Portocarrero, establishing that Colombia will help Peru with 6,000 soldiers and they will be in command of Sucre until Bolívar's arrival. Eleven days later, a new treaty signed in Lima by Rafael Urdaneta and Ramón Herrera stipulates that Colombian casualties will be replaced with Colombian soldiers who were already in the country or with Spanish prisoners. In the end, during the campaign, 13,000 Colombians would serve in Peru (3,000 arrived with Sucre), of whom 8,000 returned to their country.

On June 23, Congress deposed and banned Riva Agüero, who fled to Trujillo with his supporters, leaving power to Sucre and the new president, José Bernardo de Tagle. A conflict begins between the president of Lima (Torre Tagle) and the president of Trujillo (Riva Agüero), after failing the attempts to reach an agreement by their representatives, General Juan Salazar and Colonel Juan Manuel Iturregui respectively.

The Liberator set sail from Guayaquil on August 6. On September 1, 1823, in the brig Chimborazo and among the cheers of the people of Lima, he landed in Callao. Riva Agüero reluctantly accepted the Liberator's authority but quickly began to negotiate with the royalists. The conflict finally ended when Riva Agüero was captured in Trujillo by Colonel Antonio Gutiérrez de la Fuente's cuirassier regiment on November 25. He was exiled to Germany, where in July 1826 he married Princess Carolina de Looz Coorswarem, made an active negative press campaign against Bolívar and is said to have planned to make expeditions to crown Infante Francisco de Padua or some German prince in America. With the Colombian reinforcements he began the offensive. On December 9, 1824, the decisive battle was fought in Ayacucho, with the royalist forces surrendering on the same day.

Bolívar's regime soon became unpopular, as it was authoritarian in nature and provided citizens with less freedoms than before. A constitution drafted and approved by Bolívar himself in 1826 clashed with pre-existing laws in Peru, which already saw itself most opposed to Bolívar's plans due to unfavorable outcomes for the country, such as the separation of Guayaquil from the rest of the state. (Note: According to the Royal Order of June 7, 1803, Guayaquil became dependent on Peru, but the claim of the Audiencia of Quito led to a ruling in 1807 that it was only militarily, not politically or economically. Nevertheless there were still strong family, economic and cultural ties between the elites of Lima and the port, which was a supplier of timber to Callao. In 1809-1810, the Peruvian viceroyalty took over the city as a result of the Quito meetings. In 1815, with the reconquest of New Granada, the porteños requested to return to the authority of Bogotá, which was accepted on April 6, 1820 by the king. That was the justification of the Colombians.)

=== Bolivian independence and territorial claims ===
What provoked the most resistance to Bolívar was the independence of Charcas. With strong commercial and cultural ties with Peru, it had been under the authority of Lima since 1810 to prevent the revolutionary troops from conquering it. In fact, the town councils had called for such annexation, although in truth it was a maneuver by the viceroy to justify his policy. Viceroy Abascal took advantage of the existence of some royalist strongholds in South America to carry out a policy of territorial expansion autonomously to Spain and at the expense of the "two Bourbon creatures" (the Bourbon viceroyalties that had rapidly collapsed), and also it was a strategy of going on the offensive against the governing boards.

With a strong anti-Napoleonic propaganda in Peru, sending money and reinforcements to its allies, expeditions were able to be armed that allowed to recover the old viceregal territories. The rejection of this expansionism would be one of the causes of the Chilean-River Plate (1820-1821) and Gran-Colombian (1823-1826) interventions that achieved their purpose of ending Abascal's work. On the other hand, the Peruvian patriots never positioned themselves against this integration policy, the ephemeral nature of their movements prevented it. Abascal's policy of territorial recovery and turning Peru into the symbolic and material center of the South American counterrevolution, was only possible thanks to the coincidence of interests between the Spanish authority and the Peruvian aristocracy.

The revolutionary governments of Lima considered Charcas their territory. One of the reasons that Riva Agüero dispatched the Santa Cruz expedition before Bolívar arrived was to ensure Peruvian sovereignty in Charcas, as he correctly assumed that Colombians did not look favorably on an overly powerful Peru. The result was a military disaster and a confrontation between the Peruvian president and Bolívar.

Despite all controversy, a new country had soon emerged under the name of the Republic of Bolívar, with Bolívar hoping that this new country could serve as a base for his Andean project. Sucre was accused of wanting to divide Peru for allowing this to happen and controversy continued to arise, and in the end the country was left independent in order to serve as a role model not only for Bolívar's planned confederation, but for other soon-to-be states, such as Ecuador.

The Bolivians also claimed Arica, the port where they exported their wealth, but they were forced to stay with Cobija, since Bolívar did not want to provoke the people of Lima any further. However, he offered to hand over Arica to them if they formed a federation with Peru while maintaining the Peruvian sovereignty over the port. Legal workarounds were unsuccessfully worked on by the newly formed Bolivian nation, and this desire to gain the Arican port later manifested itself in its support and active efforts to realize the Peru–Bolivian Confederation.

=== Attempts at Peruvian–Bolivian integration ===
At the time, general opinion was that the existence of the "two Perus" would be temporary, and that soon the Libertador's dream of a large Peruvian state would come true. The Bolivian leadership, however delayed any union as much as it was possible, and attempted to negotiate borders that would benefit the new nation in order to recover itself financially. Such plans would have transferred the territories of Arequipa, Cuzco, Puno and Arica to Bolivia. The timing was on the Bolivian side as well, since at the time Peru found itself politically unstable.

== War ==
=== Chuquisaca Mutiny ===
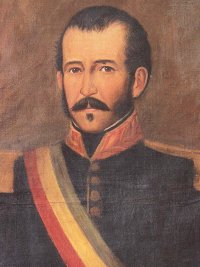
Pedro Blanco Soto, Bolivian general whose troops collaborated with Gamarra.

The war began with a mutiny in Chuquisaca. On the early mornings of April 18, 1828, Sucre was informed at the National Palace that the Colombian soldiers of the Voltígeros battalion had risen up in the La Guardia barracks. The president sent Colonel José Escolástico Andrade to control the situation, and shortly after he personally attended in the company of his aides, Minister Infante and Colombian captain Cipriano Escalona. There he was received by bullets by the mutineers. Enraged by the reception, he applied spurs to the horse and entered accompanied by Escalona. He rebuked the soldiers asking them:

Grenadiers, what is happening here? What do you want?

Before finishing the sentence, however, three closed volleys by order of Sergeant Guillermo Cainzo from Tucumán pierced his hat, superficially wounded him on the forehead and right arm, while Escalona was hit in the left. The situation very quickly escalated to the point where the assistance of Colombian troops in Bolivia were requested, as well as three messages to Bolívar requesting an invasion of Peru from the north.

While he was convalescing, on April 20, Sucre sent a power of attorney to marry Mariana Carcelén, who was in Quito. Eight days later, Gamarra met with his officers and informed them that La Mar had given him complete freedom to act in the south. He ordered General Blas Cerdeña to send the vanguard of sappers at the river crossing and that a reserve be in charge of Manuel Martínez de Aparicio. His army consisted of the 1st and 2nd battalions from Zepita, 1st and 2nd from Callao and Pichincha, and the Hussars of Junín and Dragones de Arequipa squadrons.

=== Gamarra intervenes ===
On May 1, Gamarra crossed the Desaguadero river with an army of 4,000~5,000 men. The Peruvian general published a proclamation criticizing Sucre's policy and indicating that Upper and Lower Peru should be unified. At that time, the insurgents of Chuquisaca had proclaimed Dr. José Antonio Abencey as president, and Gamarra recognized him and affirmed to invade with his authorization given in a letter of April 20. He also sent letters to Sucre offering to preserve order, inviting him to national reconciliation and promising that his troops would never attempt against the life of the victor of Ayacucho. On May 10, Sucre thanked him for his courtesy but refused his help by not trusting his intentions, as it was known that Gamarra had indirectly promoted the mutiny.

This is an internal revolution and to put down it I have enough strength, but I prefer to give my neck to the blade of my murderers, rather than agree that the principle of intervention is sanctioned in America

The La Mar government did nothing to arrest its general because:

[...] the tone of Peruvian politics was one of accentuated anti-Colombianism. It was then believed in Peru that, after the emancipation of Spain, the emancipation of Colombia had come: and it was desired to extend the latter to Bolivia, where a Colombian division continued, despite Sucre's efforts to achieve its departure, Peru had in the North an imminent war with Bolívar and with Colombia and he was suspicious of a combined attack from there and from Bolivia, if Sucre was still at the head of this Republic.

=== Movements ===
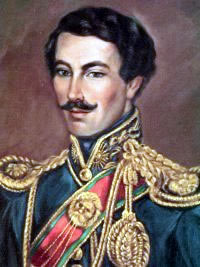
José María Pérez de Urdininea, acting president of Bolivia after Antonio José de Sucre was injured.

Bolivian troops began to desert before Gamarra's promises. The 300 grenadiers from the Pichincha battalion camped in Viacha, near La Paz, joined the Peruvian general as soon as he arrived on May 7. The next day he entered the city in triumph. Pérez de Urdininea, who was in Viacha, withdrew with his few followers to La Paz and then to Oruro, where he established his base on the 17th. Gamarra followed him to Caracollo, not far from his headquarters.

On May 17, General Blanco Soto rose up with the 800 soldiers of the Cazadores a Caballo regiment and other units in Chinchas, near Potosí. Eight days later, when Gamarra was leaving Sica Sica for Panduro, he learned of the rebellion and decided to contact Blanco Soto. On the 22nd, the captain of the Dragones de Montenegro charged against a party of 32 Bolivians and captured 29, including Lieutenant Mota, who was slightly wounded and brought before Gamarra, who freed him and his soldiers. Mota left but his men joined the Peruvian army. On the 26th Colonel Ramón González, the commander of Cazadores Manuel Valdez (chiefs of the 1st and 2nd battalions of Bolivia respectively) and artillery captain Narciso Núñez attempted a mutiny in Paria but were surprised before carrying it out. They fled and two days later they arrived at the Peruvian camp in Caracollo.

After holding a war junta in Oruro, the provisional president Pérez de Urdininea decided to send General López de Quiroga against Blanco Soto, considered a military error by dividing his forces and not facing the Peruvian army, allowing him to enter and be honored as a liberator to Oruro, Potosí and Chuquisaca. Gamarra and Pérez de Urdininea sent their representatives to negotiate. It is mentioned however that the negotiations failed because Juan Bautista Zubiaga, one of Gamarra's messengers, treated Bolivians with contempt.

Near Oruro, in Caihuasi (also called Collahuasi or Caihuasi), during the cold night of May 31, while the rabonas attended the soldiers under the command of Francisca Zubiaga y Bernales, Gamarra's wife, Braun's cavalry tried to steal the horses of the Peruvian army, but the hunters from Pichincha knew how to disperse the hundred Bolivians who arrived in Cuzco. The incident resulted in 9 deaths on the Peruvian side. Gamarra continued to Oruro, where he entered on June 2.

While General Blas Cerdeña's division left Quillacollo and occupied Cochabamba on June 10, General Blanco Soto avoided López de Quiroga by marching south from Potosí until almost reaching Tupiza, then west and finally counter-marching north to join to the Peruvian general Sardinia, occupying Chuquisaca together on June 12, two days after Pérez de Urdininea left it. Upon arrival, they sent a picket to Nucho, where Sucre was convalescing, arresting him on July 4. Shortly after he released him and let Mojotoro go. Gamarra's assistant, Colonel Bernardo Escudero, was left in charge and was visited by the young captain José Rufino Echenique. Shortly before, Braun tried again to resist, this time in Oruro he managed to force the Zepita battalion to withdraw without suffering casualties from the bulk of the Peruvian army. When the main enemy force came, they withdrew defeated. Thus, all of Bolivia, except Santa Cruz and Tarija, was left in the hands of Gamarra and the Peruvian Army.

=== Treaty of Piquiza ===
Preliminary Treaty of Peace and Military Withdrawal
- Type: Peace treaty
- Signed: 6 July 1828
- Location: Piquiza, (Note: The location of Piquiza is uncertain due to its lack of appearance in maps of Bolivia, but is most likely located in the Linares Province of Potosí Department, near Potosí itself.) Bolivia
- Signatories: Peru; Bolivia
- Languages: Spanish

Knowing the futility of resisting, Sucre asked Pérez de Urdininea to negotiate with Gamarra. Finally his representatives signed a treaty in Piquiza on July 6. The Colombians would leave through Arica in Peruvian transports paid for by Bolivia. The convening of a new Constituent Congress was also stipulated on August 1, expiring the powers of the then deputies. Before the new Congress was installed and to avoid confrontations, Gamarra sent Cerdeña to La Paz with the Pichincha, Callao and Zepita battalions and the Hussars of Junín and Dragones de Arequipa squadrons. The general managed to impose order between those who were in favor of the prefect José Ramón de Loayza Pacheco, who took office when the Peruvians arrived, and those of Dr. Baltazar Alquiza, the previous prefect.

Pérez de Urdininea addressed a proclamation to the Bolivians and another to the soldiers, congratulating them on their independence and defending that the Treaty of Piquiza had been signed to avoid a civil war. On August 2, Sucre gave his last speech before Congress in Chuquisaca, but no one appeared; The same thing happened the next day and so he understood that everyone was waiting for him to leave to start sessions. He commissioned Deputy Mariano Calvimonte to read his speech, which included his resignation, ideas on how to organize the government, and a three-person roster for the position of vice president. In the afternoon he left the city with a large group, arriving in Cobija on the 25th. On September 4 he embarked on the English frigate Porcupine for Callao with Lieutenant Colonels Estanislao Andrade and Juan Antonio Azaldeburo, Captain José Valero and Surgeon Captain Santiago Zavala.

Gamarra, promoted to Grand Marshal by the treaty, sent 10,000 pesos to Braun for the troops to leave and commissioned General Martínez de Aparicio to watch over their march. On July 27 and 28, the Dragones and Hussars squadrons of Gran Colombia left La Paz for Arica, via the Tacora route. Sergeant Major Juan Bautista Zubiaga was sent from Oruro in advance to find and prepare transports that would take them to his homeland. While the Bolivian Assembly elected a new government, the Peruvians would garrison Potosí and withdraw from Cochabamba, Oruro and La Paz, while the Bolivians stationed in Chuquisaca, Cochabamba, Santa Cruz and Tarija would be in charge of imposing order in most of the country.

An important consequence of Piquiza was that it marked the definitive end of any project to unite Colombia, Peru and Bolivia.

=== Gamarra's withdrawal ===
On September 3, Gamarra said goodbye to the Minister of Foreign Affairs, and on the 8th of the same month he declared that Bolivia was free to establish itself and that the National Assembly was in charge of governing its destinies. He immediately issued the necessary provisions for the Peruvian army, following the route designated in the treaty, to cross the Desaguadero. The reaction was parties and banquets in Chuquisaca, and while the Peruvian general strolled through the streets he received cheers and flowers were thrown at him from the balconies. On October 17, Gamarra arrived in Arequipa. Prefect La Fuente encouraged the people to receive him with applause and cheers.

The causes of Gamarra's retirement are discussed, in a letter to Bolívar from Guayaquil on September 18 of that year Sucre wrote:

I think that certainly the Peruvian troops evacuate to Bolivia for the double reason of attending the war with Colombia and because Gamarra is convinced that those peoples are pronounced for independence and, although he has spoken to them about incorporation into Peru, he will not want to now violate them.

Bolivian historiography maintains that the withdrawal was due to the possibility of an uprising in arms against the invading troops by General José Miguel de Velasco, something that would have been very bloody and costly for Peru, as well as the lack of political support for Gamarra; considering that the possible reason was a combination of the two mentioned above. Peruvian historians, on the other hand, say that Gamarra was the true founder of Bolivia as a country independent of all external power thanks to this intervention.

In his farewell proclamation to the Bolivian people, Gamarra expressed:

[...] that the troops who had come to restore their rights were leaving without having broken their word and promises [...] [the republic of] Bolívar already has its own existence, its fate remains in the hands of its children. A national assembly is summoned to reform the ignominious Charter that ambitious foreigners handed you with the tips of their bayonets, just to colonize you. May its august inauguration be the beginning of your glory and prosperity ... may the country be happy, may the national assembly be the pillar of your happiness, gather around it, respect its laws, concord and fraternity be your motto. If not, sorry to say, you are going to plunge into blood and anarchy.

== Consequences ==
With the enemy in the rear eliminated and an authoritarianism even more extreme than their own overthrown, the Peruvians prepared for the foreseeable declaration of war by Colombia. They also demanded military aid from the new Bolivian government, but this government was more concerned about its diplomatic relations with Brazil and refused.

If Peru conquers Bolivia and preserves it, the South of Colombia runs a thousand and a thousand risks.

— Letter from Sucre to Bolívar, La Paz, January 27, 1828.

The foreseeable war eventually became true with the Gran Colombia–Peru War that would not end until February 1829 with a stalemate between the two countries.

=== The Republic of Upper Peru ===
Because of Gamarra's non-intervention policy in Bolivia, Blanco Soto and Loayza Pacheco revolted in September 1828, with the latter declaring the independence of the La Paz Department under the name of the Republic of Upper Peru. Despite this limited control, it claimed the entirety of the Bolivian state. This forced the convening of a new assembly that met in the department of Chuquisaca in the Convention of December 1828, composed for the most part of supporters of Gamarra, who appointed Blanco president and the now general Loayza vice president on 26 December.

However, the measures adopted by his new government were not to the liking of the Bolivian military leadership, especially the one headed by José Ballivián, a Bolivian nationalist. 5 days later he deposed Blanco, and on December 31, 1828, the Blanco's government was overthrown when the president was preparing to go to a mass in full dress. Ballivián arrested Vice President Loayza at the entrance of the National Palace. Blanco Soto tried to hide in a latrine but was also captured and with his arm in a sling he was transferred prisoner to the Recoleta convent where he would be killed by the guard that guarded him on January 1, 1829. With the death of Blanco Soto and the arrest of Loayza, the ill-fated Republic of Upper Peru also would come to an end.

== See also ==
- Peruvian–Bolivian War
