= Cabinet of José Miguel de Velasco I =

Bolivian presidential administration and ministerial cabinet from 1828 to 1829

Velasco cabinet
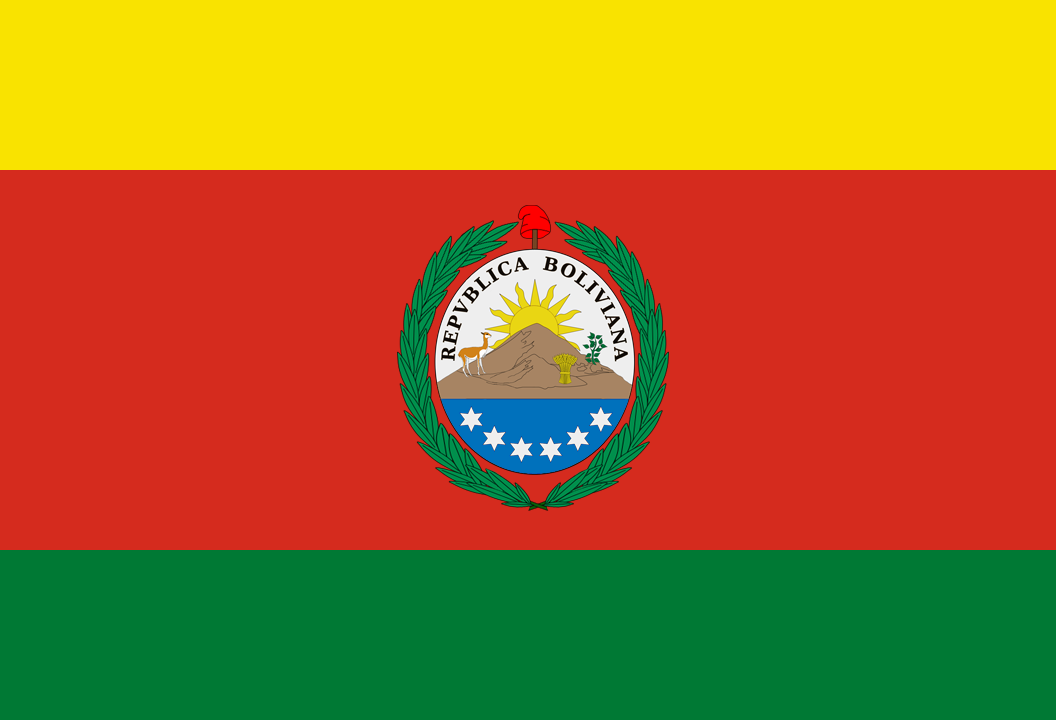
- 4th Cabinet of the Republic of Bolivia
- 1828–1829
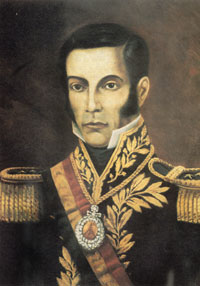
- Date formed: 12 August 1828
- Date dissolved: 24 May 1829

People and organisations
- President: José Miguel de Velasco (1828); Pedro Blanco Soto (1828–1829); José Miguel de Velasco (1829)
- Vice President: Vacant (1828); José Ramón de Loayza (1828–1829); Vacant (1829)
- No. of ministers: 3 (on 24 May 1829)
- Total no. of members: 6 (including former members)

History
- Predecessor: Cabinet of Antonio José de Sucre
- Successor: Cabinet of Andrés de Santa Cruz

José Miguel de Velasco assumed offices as the 4th President of Bolivia on 12 August 1828. Due to the tumultuous events of the time, the original cabinet formed by Velasco on 12 August 1828 continued to function until 24 May 1829, spanning the entire six day presidency of Pedro Blanco Soto and the two nonconsecutive terms of Velasco which preceded and succeeded him.

Velasco formed one cabinet during his presidency, constituting the 4th national cabinet of Bolivia.

== Cabinet Ministers ==
Cabinet of Bolivia Presidency of José Miguel de Velasco, 1828 and 1829
Office	Minister	Party	Prof.	Term	Days	N.C (Note: Denoting which national cabinet the minister was originally a part of.)	P.C (Note: Denoting which presidential cabinet the minister was originally a part of.)
President	José Miguel de Velasco	Ind.	Mil.	2 August 1828 – 12 August 1828	10	–	–
President	José Miguel de Velasco	Ind.	Mil.	12 August 1828 – 18 December 1828	128	–	–
President	José Ramón de Loayza	Ind.	Mil.	18 December 1828 – 26 December 1828	8	–	–
President	Pedro Blanco Soto	Ind.	Mil.	26 December 1828 – 1 January 1829	6	–	–
President	José Miguel de Velasco	Ind.	Mil.	1 January 1829 – 31 January 1829	30	–	–
President	José Miguel de Velasco	Ind.	Mil.	31 January 1829 – 24 May 1829	113	–	–
Vice President	Office vacant 2 August 1828 – 26 December 1828 (Note: On 12 August 1828, the Constituent Congress elected Andrés de Santa Cruz and José Miguel de Velasco interim President and Vice President of the Republic. As Santa Cruz was in Santiago serving as ambassador of Peru to Chile, he was never able to arrive in Bolivia to assume the presidency with Velasco serving as acting president in his absence. Velasco remained acting president until Congress ultimately decided to elect a new president on 18 December. For this reason, Velasco never assumed office as vice president and he is not considered the first Vice President of Bolivia. Rather, his short mandate is considered his first presidential term.)				136	–	–
Vice President	José Ramón de Loayza (Note: On 18 December 1828, the Constituent Congress elected Pedro Blanco Soto and José Ramón de Loayza interim President and Vice President of the Republic. As Blanco Soto was absent at the time, Loayza served as acting president until Blanco Soto's arrival on 26 December 1828 at which point he assumed office as vice president.)	Ind.	Mil.	26 December 1828 – 1 January 1829	6	–	–
Vice President	Office vacant 1 January 1829 – 24 May 1829 (Note: On 31 January 1829, the Constituent Congress once again elected Andrés de Santa Cruz and José Miguel de Velasco interim President and Vice President of the Republic. As Santa Cruz was absent, Velasco served as acting president until Santa Cruz's arrival on 24 May 1829 at which point he assumed office as vice president.)				143	–	–
Minister of Interior and Foreign Affairs	Casimiro Olañeta	Ind.	Law.	12 August 1828 – 1 February 1829	173	4	1
Minister of Interior and Foreign Affairs	Mariano del Callejo	Ind.	Law.	1 February 1829 – 24 May 1829	112	4	1
Minister of War	José María Pérez de Urdininea	Military	Mil.	9 December 1827 – 1 February 1829	420	3 (Note: Originally a member of the 3rd national cabinet of Bolivia.)	2 (Note: Originally a member of the Sucre ministerial cabinet.)
Minister of War	Anselmo Rivas	Military	Mil.	1 February 1829 – 24 May 1829	112	4	1
Minister of Finance	Miguel María de Aguirre	Ind.	Law.	29 March 1828 – 1 February 1829	309	3	2
Minister of Finance	Hilarión Fernández	Ind.	Law.	1 February 1829 – 24 May 1829	112	4	1

== Composition ==
President Antonio José de Sucre had formed two cabinets composed of three ministries during his presidency. On 18 April 1828, a military mutiny in Chuquisaca left Sucre wounded and incapable of performing presidential duties. In his capacity as President of the Council of Ministers, Minister of War José María Pérez de Urdininea assumed the presidency on an interim basis until Sucre presented his official resignation on 2 August.

On 12 August 1828, the Constituent Congress elected Andrés de Santa Cruz president with José Miguel de Velasco as vice president. Santa Cruz, who at the time was in Santiago serving as the ambassador of Peru to Chile, would never assume office and Velasco served as interim president until 18 December. During this time, the main composition of Sucre's cabinet remained intact with Pérez de Urdininea as Minister of War and Miguel María de Aguirre as Minister of Finance. The removal of Infante Facundo as Minister of the Interior in favor of Mariano del Callejo on 12 August was the only change made.

As it became clear that Santa Cruz would not arrive to assume the presidency, the Congress reconvened on 18 December and elected Pedro Blanco Soto and José Ramón de Loayza president and vice president. Loayza served as acting president until the arrival of Blanco Soto on 26 December. However, Blanco Soto never had the opportunity to form a cabinet of his own as he was arrested and assassinated on 1 January 1829 after just six days in office. Following the death of Blanco Soto, the Congress once again reconvened and renominated its original choice of Santa Cruz and Velasco for president and vice president on 31 January 1829. The following day, Velasco, again as acting president in the absence of Santa Cruz, formed a cabinet, removing Sucre's original ministers as well as Olañeta in favor of three new ministers.

The fact that all members of Velasco's cabinet remained in office through Blanco Soto's presidency means that his cabinet is counted as a single body from 12 August 1828 to 24 May 1829 rather than two separate ones despite Velaco's nonconsecutive terms.

== Bibliography ==
- Gisbert, Carlos D. Mesa (2003). Presidentes de Bolivia: entre urnas y fusiles : el poder ejecutivo, los ministros de estado (in Spanish). Editorial Gisbert. pp. 342–344.
