= Federation of the Andes =

Proposed confederation of Grand Colombia, Peru and Bolivia

Federation of the Andes Federación de los Andes
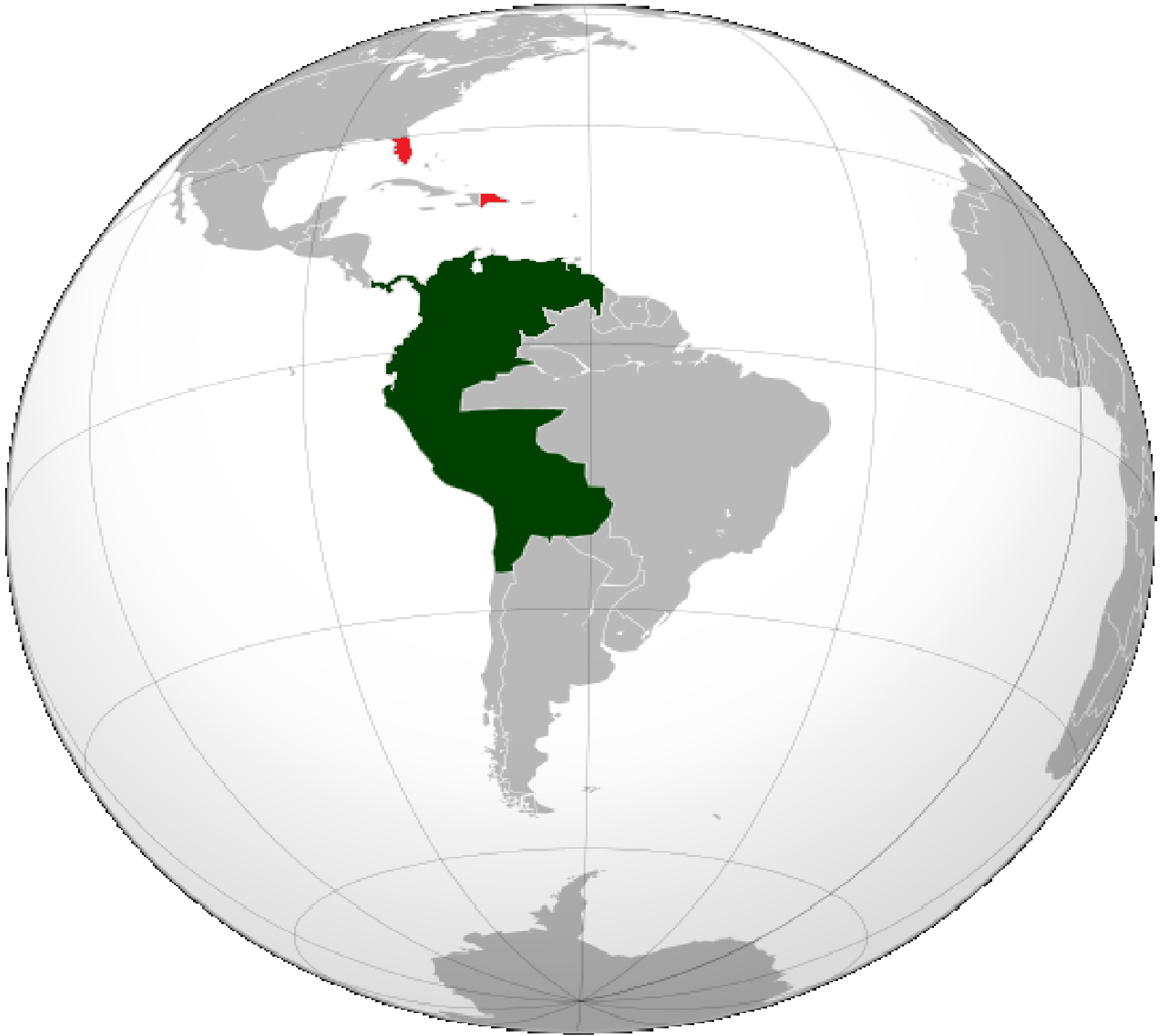
- Capital: Quito or Guayaquil
- Common languages: Spanish
- Religion: Catholicism
- Government: Confederation (de jure, never implemented)
- Historical era: Spanish American wars of independence

The Federation of the Andes was an 1826 proposal for a confederation of Colombia, Peru and Bolivia by Libertador Simón Bolivar. During the Spanish American wars of independence, Bolívar and his lieutenant Antonio José de Sucre played a decisive role in achieving the independence of the three countries and held considerable influence in them, by way of their armies and by being elected leaders of Colombia and Bolivia respectively. Because of a series of disagreements the project never came to be, and was later abandoned in favor of the independence of the aforementioned countries. Strictly speaking, it was not a project of integration. Had Bolívar's project succeeded, the Republic of Peru would have been split into two entities, with Lima and Arequipa as the capitals of the North Peruvian and South Peruvian states respectively, while its southern coast (south of the Sama River, including the provinces of Arica and Tarapacá) would have been incorporated into Bolivia.

The project has been known under different names in the literature such as Confederation of the Andes (Confederación de los Andes), Federation of the Andes (Federación de los Andes), Bolivian Federation (Federación Boliviana) and Andean Federation (Federación Andina).

The plan required that the union be initiated in, and promoted by, Bolivia and Peru so as not to be seen in those countries as a Colombian imposition. For this reason, Antonio José de Sucre governed in the former while Bolívar tried to impose the plan in Lima. It was expected that Sucre would negotiate with the Peruvians to add them to the Federation. This would be done through plenipotentiaries. Once the Liberator's constitution was established in Bolivia, it was necessary to continue with Peru and finally with Colombia. To achieve this, he had to maintain Colombian troops in Peru and Bolivia, which increased the discontent that his lifelong constitutions already produced, because they were seen as the praetorian guards of his puppet governments.

Peru rejected the Bolivarian confederation, which would have split the country into two states (North and South, with Lima and Arequipa as capitals) and ceded its southern coast —including Arica and Tarapacá— to Bolivia. Bolívar left Peru on September 4, 1826, leaving a provisional Government Junta headed by Andrés de Santa Cruz to advance his project for a Federation of the Andes, but it failed shortly afterward. Under pressure from the Peruvian Congress and public opinion, negotiations began for the withdrawal of the Gran Colombian troops occupying Callao. The division mutinied, and on February 16, 1827, with command of the Real Felipe Fortress handed over to Peruvian authorities, Peru regained full sovereignty and began its republican life free of all foreign domination.

== See also ==
- Dissolution of Gran Colombia (1826–1831)
- Peruvian–Bolivian War of 1828
- Peru–Bolivian Confederation (1836–1839)
- Colombia–Peru War (1828–1829)
- Spanish American wars of independence (1809–1829)

== Books ==
- Baralt, Rafael María; Díaz, Ramón (1841). Resumen de la historia de Venezuela, desde 1797 hasta 1830 (in Spanish). Vol. II. Paris: Imprenta de H. Fournier & Cía.
- Basadre, Jorge (1998). Historia de la República del Perú, 1822-1933 (in Spanish). Vol. I (8th ed.). Lima: Diario de la República.
- Belaúnde, Víctor Andrés (1997). La constitución inicial del Perú ante el derecho internacional (in Spanish). Lima: Universidad Nacional Mayor de San Marcos. ISBN 9789972460418.
- Bushnell, David (2002). Simón Bolívar: hombre de Caracas, proyecto de América: una biografía (in Spanish). Buenos Aires: Biblos. ISBN 9789507863158.
- Cisneros, Andrés; Escudé, Carlos; Corbacho, Alejandro L. (1998a). "El temor a la expansión brasileña". Historia general de las relaciones exteriores de la República Argentina. Las relaciones exteriores de la Argentina embrionaria (1806-1881). Los mini-Estados provinciales del Río de la Plata en tiempos de las guerras contra el Brasil y contra la Confederación peruano-boliviana (in Spanish). Buenos Aires: Consejo Argentino para las Relaciones Internacionales, Centro de Estudios de Política Exterior & Grupo Editor Latinoamericano.
- Cisneros, Andrés; Escudé, Carlos; Corbacho, Alejandro L. (1998b). "Las relaciones intrasudamericanas hacia 1825". Historia general de las relaciones exteriores de la República Argentina. Las relaciones exteriores de la Argentina embrionaria (1806-1881). Los mini-Estados provinciales del Río de la Plata en tiempos de las guerras contra el Brasil y contra la Confederación peruano-boliviana (in Spanish). Buenos Aires: Consejo Argentino para las Relaciones Internacionales, Centro de Estudios de Política Exterior & Grupo Editor Latinoamericano.
- Mitre, Bartolomé (1890). Lajouane, Félix (ed.). Historia de San Martín y de la emancipación sud-americana (in Spanish). Vol. V. Buenos Aires: W. M. Jackson editore.

== Articles ==
- De Espinosa Fernández de Córdoba, Carlos (2002). "Entre la ciudad y el continente: opciones para la construcción de los estados andinos en la época de la Independencia". Revista Andina (34). Cuzco: 155–181. ISSN 0259-9600.
- Paucar Limaylla, Josué Centella (2014). "Simón Bolívar y La Federación de los Andes: El Proyecto Político y el Intento de Construcción de Estado en el Perú, 1823 a 1826". Pacarina del Sur. V (18). Mexico: Tirso Ricardo Melgar Bao editor. ISSN 2007-2309.
- García Belaunde, José Antonio (September 27–28, 2000). El sueño de Bolívar: de la Federación de los Andes a la Comunidad Andina. El Sueño de Bolívar. El Futuro de la Representación Política y de la Integración de los Países Andinos. Biarritz.
- Paniagua Corazao, Valentín (2008). "El proceso constituyente y la Constitución vitalicia (bolivariana) de 1826 (II)". Revista Historia Constitucional (9). Revista Electrónica de Historia Constitucional. ISSN 1576-4729.
