= Republic of Upper Peru =

Short-lived unrecognized state in Bolivia

Republic of Upper Peru Spanish: República del Alto Perú
- 1828
- Flag

- Modern map of La Paz Province
- Status: Associated state of Peru
- Capital: La Paz
- President
  - 1828: Pedro Blanco Soto
- Vice-president
  - 1828: José Ramón de Loayza Pacheco
- Historical era: 1828 Peruvian–Bolivian War
  - Loayza mutiny: September 1828
  - Death of Blanco Soto: 31 December 1828
Preceded by	Succeeded by
Bolivia	Bolivia
- Today part of: Bolivia

The Republic of Upper Peru (Spanish: República del Alto Perú) was an unrecognized state formed in 1828 after a revolt led by Pedro Blanco Soto and José Ramón de Loayza Pacheco as a consequence of the 1828 Peruvian–Bolivian War.

== History ==
Because of Gamarra's non-intervention policy in Bolivia, Blanco Soto and Loayza revolted in September 1828, with the latter declaring the independence of the La Paz Department under the name of the Republic of Upper Peru. Despite its limited control, it claimed the entirety of the Bolivian state. That forced the convening of a new assembly, which met in the department of Chuquisaca in the Convention of December 1828, which was composed for the most part of supporters of Gamarra, and appointed Blanco president and now-General Loayza vice president on 26 December.

However, the measures adopted by his new government were not to the liking of the Bolivian military leadership, especially the one headed by José Ballivián, a Bolivian nationalist who he deposed Blanco five days later. On December 31, 1828, Blanco's government was overthrown when the president was preparing in full dress to go to Mass. Ballivián arrested Vice President Loayza at the entrance of the National Palace. Blanco Soto tried to hide in a latrine but was also captured and, with his arm in a sling, was transferred prisoner to the Recoleta convent, where he was killed by the guard who guarded him on January 1, 1829. With the death of Blanco Soto and the arrest of Loayza, the ill-fated Republic of Upper Peru also came to an end.

== See also ==
- Gran Colombia–Peru War
