= Olañeta =

Olañeta is a toponymic surname of Basque origin, originating from the municipality of Elgeta, in the province of Gipuzkoa, Spain. Its etymology comes from the Basque word ola, which can mean either "hut" or "forge," so the surname could be interpreted as "place of huts" or "place of forges."

== History ==
The ancestral home (casa solar) of the Olañeta family was located in Elgeta, although it never held the rank of a palace. Nevertheless, the family presented proof of nobility on various occasions.

During the 18th century, several members of the lineage emigrated to the viceroyalties of Peru and the Río de la Plata, where they gained prominence in commerce and public administration. Among them was Juan José de Olañeta Albistegui (1766–1826), who served as alcalde ordinario (municipal mayor) of the city of Cuzco. One of his daughters married the first Marquis of Valdeterrazo, and his son, José Mariano de Olañeta y Ocampo (1795–1868), returned to Spain after the Spanish American Wars of Independence. On the Iberian Peninsula, he held the positions of mayor of Jerez de la Frontera and senator for the province of Seville in several legislative sessions.

José Mariano de Olañeta was a cousin of Brigadier General Pedro Antonio de Olañeta (1774–1825), commander of the royalist forces in the Royal Audiencia of Charcas, present-day Bolivia.

Another notable member of this lineage was Casimiro Olañeta (1795–1860), an influential figure in the political life of the Republic of Bolivia, where he held positions such as Minister of State and President of the Supreme Court of Justice.

== Coat of Arms ==
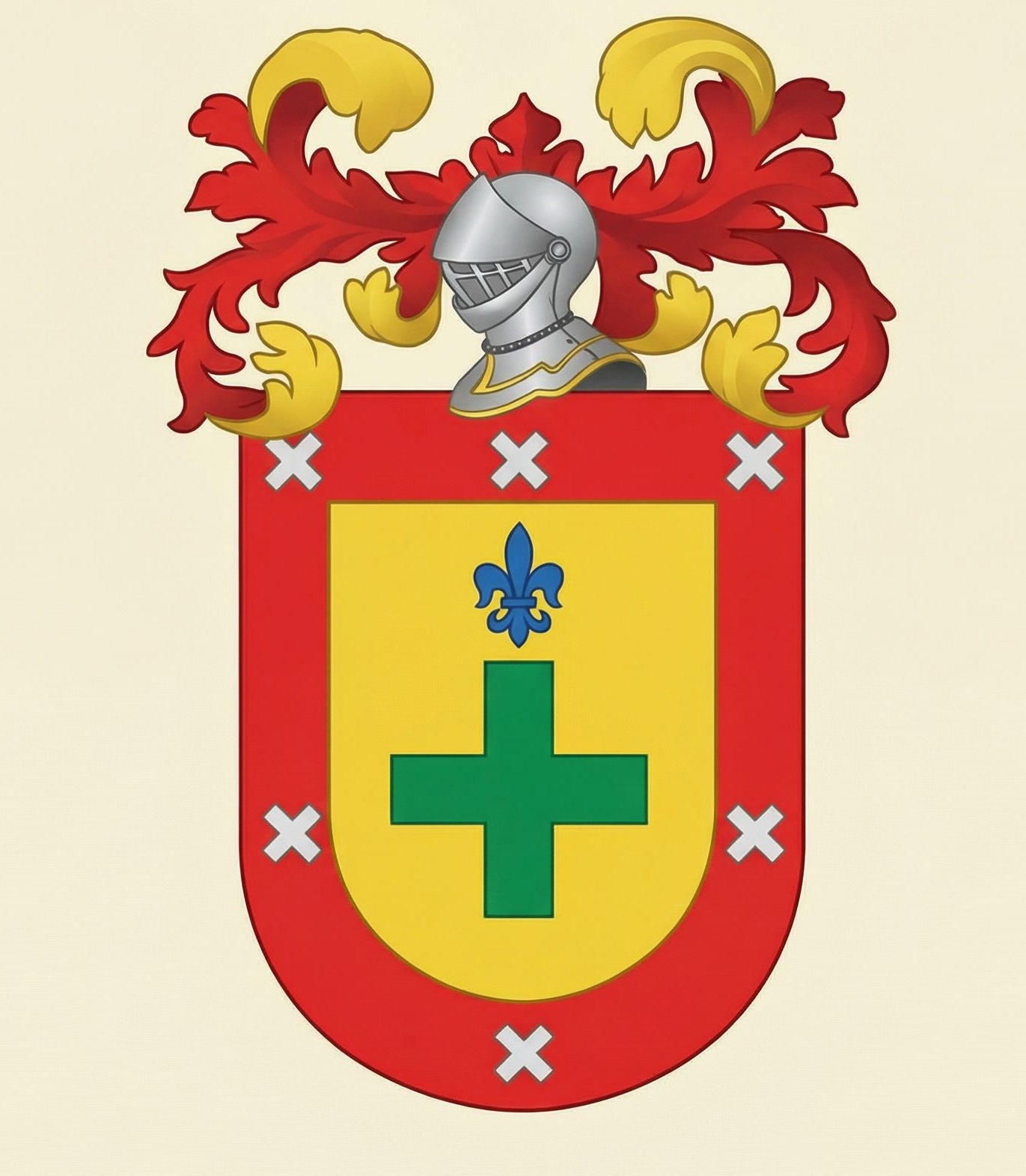
Coat of arms of the Olañeta family.

There are at least two documented coats of arms used by different branches of the Olañeta lineage. The American descendants of this family are heirs of Agustín de Olañeta y Zavala (1673–1744), who was recognized as a hijodalgo (nobleman) by the town council of Elgeta. This branch uses the following coat of arms:

On a gold field, a green cross surmounted by a blue fleur-de-lis; red border with five silver Saint Andrew crosses.
