= Peruvian–Bolivian War =

Peruvian–Bolivian War may refer to:

- Peruvian–Bolivian War of 1828, a Peruvian invasion of Bolivia led by Agustín Gamarra in 1828
- Salaverry-Santa Cruz War, an armed conflict that started in 1835 which led to the creation of the Peru–Bolivian Confederation
- War of the Confederation, a military confrontation waged by Chile, along with Peruvian dissidents, and the Argentine Confederation against the Peru–Bolivian Confederation between 1836 and 1839
- Peruvian–Bolivian War of 1841–42, a warlike confrontation between Peru and Bolivia in the years 1841 and 1842
