= Cabinet of Jorge Quiroga =

Bolivian presidential administration and ministerial cabinet from 2001 to 2002

Quiroga cabinet
- Cabinet of the Republic of Bolivia
- 2001–2002
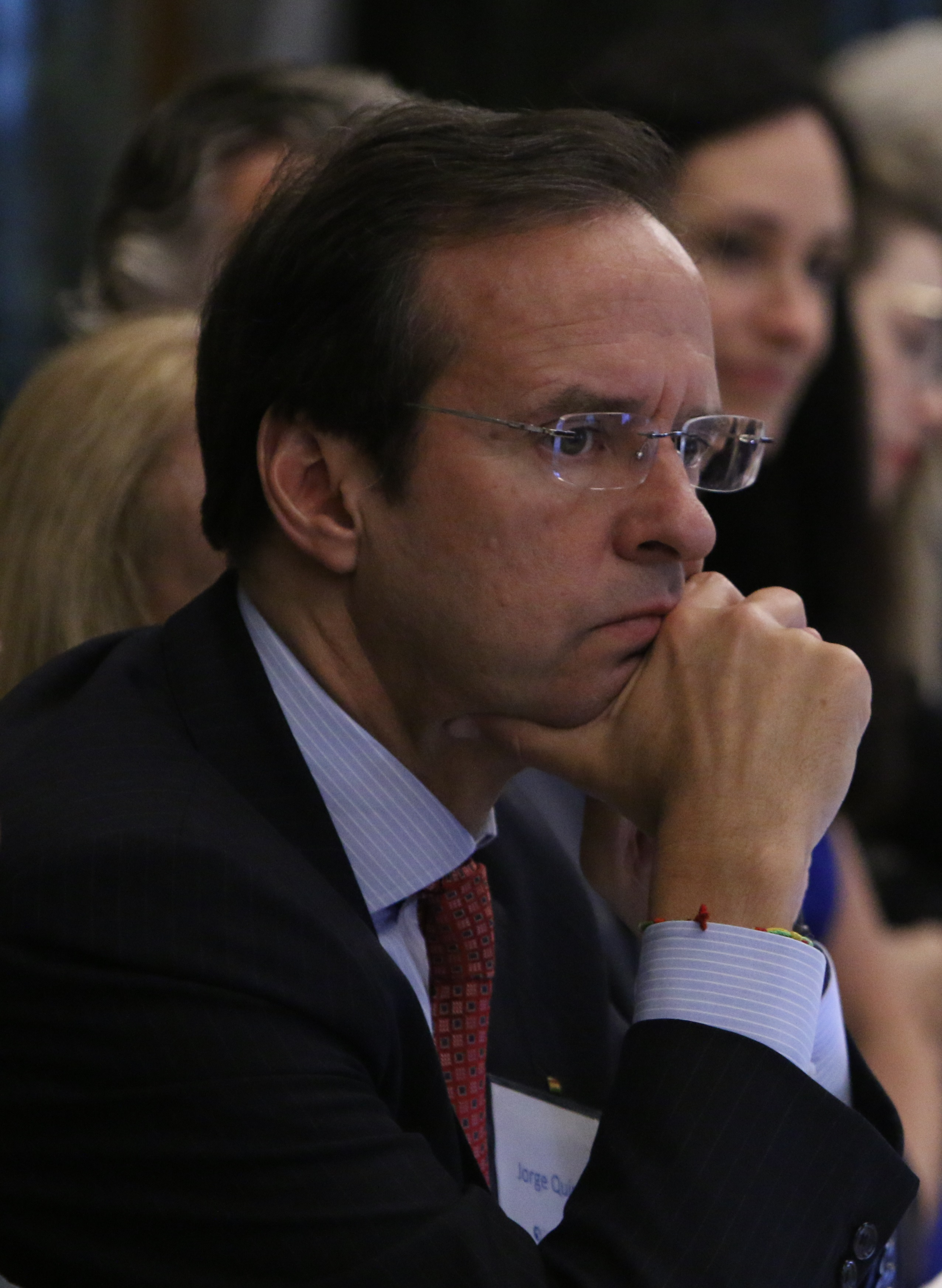
- Date formed: 7 August 2001
- Date dissolved: 6 August 2002

People and organisations
- President: Jorge Quiroga
- Vice President: Vacant
- No. of ministers: 15 (on 6 August 2002)
- Total no. of members: 20 (including former members)
- Member parties: Nationalist Democratic Action (ADN); Revolutionary Left Movement (MIR); Solidarity Civic Unity (UCS)
- Status in legislature: Minority coalition government

History
- Legislature term: 1997–2002
- Predecessor: Cabinet of Hugo Banzer
- Successor: Cabinet of Gonzalo Sánchez de Lozada

Jorge Quiroga assumed office as the 62nd President of Bolivia on 7 August 2001, and his term ended on 6 August 2002. Having previously served as vice president, Quiroga assumed the presidency after the resignation for health reasons by President Hugo Banzer and was tasked with fulfilling the final 364 days of Banzer's term.

The majority of the fourth Banzer ministerial cabinet, save for two ministers, resigned along with Banzer on 7 August 2001 allowing Jorge Quiroga to form his first ministerial cabinet the following day on 8 August. Quiroga would form his second cabinet on 5 March 2002. Quiroga's first and second ministerial cabinets comprised the 202nd and 203rd national cabinets of Bolivia.

== Cabinet Ministers ==
Cabinet of Bolivia Presidency of Jorge Quiroga, 2001–2002
| Office | Minister | Party | Prof. | Term | Days | N.C (Note: Denoting which national cabinet the minister was originally a part of.) | P.C (Note: Denoting which presidential cabinet the minister was originally a part of.) |
|---|---|---|---|---|---|---|---|
| President | Jorge Quiroga | ADN | Eng. | 7 August 2001 – 6 August 2002 | 364 | – | – |
| Vice President | Office vacant throughout presidency | | | | | – | – |
| Minister of Foreign Affairs and Worship (Chancellor) | Gustavo Fernández Saavedra | MIR | Law. | 8 August 2001 – 6 August 2002 | 363 | 202 | 1 |
| Minister of the Presidency | José Luis Lupo Flores | Ind. | Eco. | 8 August 2001 – 5 March 2002 | 209 | 202 | 1 |
| Minister of the Presidency | Alberto Leytón Avilés | – | Eng. | 5 March 2002 – 6 August 2002 | 154 | 203 | 2 |
| Minister of Government | Leopoldo Fernández | ADN | – | 8 August 2001 – 5 March 2002 | 209 | 202 | 1 |
| Minister of Government | José Luis Lupo Flores | Ind. | Eco. | 5 March 2002 – 6 August 2002 | 154 | 203 | 2 |
| Minister of National Defense | Oscar Guilarte | ADN | Mil. | 8 August 2001 – 6 August 2002 | 363 | 202 | 1 |
| Minister of Finance | Jacques Trigo Loubiere | Ind. | Eco. | 8 August 2001 – 6 August 2002 | 363 | 202 | 1 |
| Minister of Economic Development | Carlos Kempff Bruno | Ind. | Eco. | 8 August 2001 – 6 August 2002 | 363 | 202 | 1 |
| Minister of Housing and Basic Services | Javier Nogales | UCS | Eco. | 8 August 2001 – 6 August 2002 | 363 | 202 | 1 |
| Minister of Sustainable Development, Planning, and Environment | Ramiro Cavero | Ind. | Eco. | 8 August 2001 – 6 August 2002 | 363 | 202 | 1 |
| Minister of Justice and Human Rights | Mario Serrate Ruíz | ADN | Law. | 8 August 2001 – 5 March 2002 | 209 | 202 | 1 |
| Minister of Justice and Human Rights | Carlos Alberto Goitia Caballero | – | Law. | 5 March 2002 – 6 August 2002 | 154 | 203 | 2 |
| Minister of Work and Micro-Enterprise | Jorge Pacheco Franco | UCS | – | 20 October 2000 – 13 December 2001 | 419 | 201 (Note: Originally a member of the 201st national cabinet of Bolivia.) | 4 (Note: Originally a member of the fourth Banzer ministerial cabinet.) |
| Minister of Work and Micro-Enterprise | Juan Chahín Lupo | – | Law. | 14 December 2001 – 6 August 2002 | 235 | 202 | 1 |
| Minister of Health and Social Security | Enrique Paz Argandoña | MIR | Dr. | 8 August 2001 – 6 August 2002 | 363 | 202 | 1 |
| Minister of Education, Culture, and Sports | Amalia Anaya | Ind | Soc. | 8 August 2001 – 6 August 2002 | 363 | 202 | 1 |
| Minister of Agriculture, Livestock, and Rural Development | Walter Núñez-Rodríguez | Ind. | Eco. | 8 August 2001 – 6 August 2002 | 363 | 202 | 1 |
| Minister Without Portfolio Responsible for Government Information | Mauro Bertero Gutiérrez | ADN | – | 8 August 2001 – 5 March 2002 | 209 | 202 | 1 |
| Minister Without Portfolio Responsible for Government Information | Hernán Terrazas | – | – | 5 March 2002 – 6 August 2002 | 154 | 203 | 2 |
| Minister Without Portfolio Responsible for Peasant Affairs and Indigenous Peoples | Wigberto Ribero Pinto | MIR | – | 30 October 2000 – 5 March 2002 | 491 | 201 | 4 |
| Minister Without Portfolio Responsible for Peasant Affairs and Indigenous Peoples | Tomasa Yarhui | MBL | Law. | 5 March 2002 – 6 August 2002 | 154 | 203 | 2 |

== Composition ==
The composition of Quiroga's first cabinet was described as "mixed" by ANF. Of the 15 ministers, six were "pseudo-independents". Minister of the Presidency José Luis Lupo Flores was an independent with links to the Revolutionary Left Movement (MIR) while Finance Minister Jacques Trigo Loubiere had been Superintendent of Banks for the Revolutionary Nationalist (MNR) government of Gonzalo Sánchez de Lozada. Ministers Carlos Kempff Bruno, Walter Nuñez-Rodriguez, and Ramiro Cavero were new political figures though with noted inclinations towards Quiroga's Nationalsit Democratic Action (ADN) party.

The remaining ministers were predominantly members of either the ADN or MIR which had been political allies since the mid-1980s. Minister of Health Enrique Paz Argandoña was notably the nephew of former MIR President Jaime Paz Zamora. Leopoldo Fernández had been President of the Chamber of Senators prior to his appointment as Minister of Government. The Quiroga cabinet was also significant in that many political "dinosaurs" were relieved of their positions in favor of younger ministers. Among ADN officials, it was commented that the "withdrawal of the dinos is total" as the only remaining so-called dino was Minister of Justice Mario Serrate who at any time could be (and indeed in 2002 was) removed by Quiroga.

The appointment of Tomasa Yarhui as Minister Without Portfolio Responsible for Peasant Affairs and Indigenous Peoples as part of the second Quiroga cabinet was of particular note due to the fact that Yarhui was the first indigenous woman appointed as government minister in Bolivian history. Yarhui would by Quiroga's running mate in his second attempt to win a full term during the 2014 general elections.

== Bibliography ==
- Gisbert, Carlos D. Mesa (2003). Presidentes de Bolivia: entre urnas y fusiles : el poder ejecutivo, los ministros de estado (in Spanish). Editorial Gisbert. p. 386.
