= Tucuyo =

Coarse cotton cloth made in Latin America

Tucuyo is a type of coarse cotton cloth made in Latin America.
