= History of Bolivia (1809–1920) =

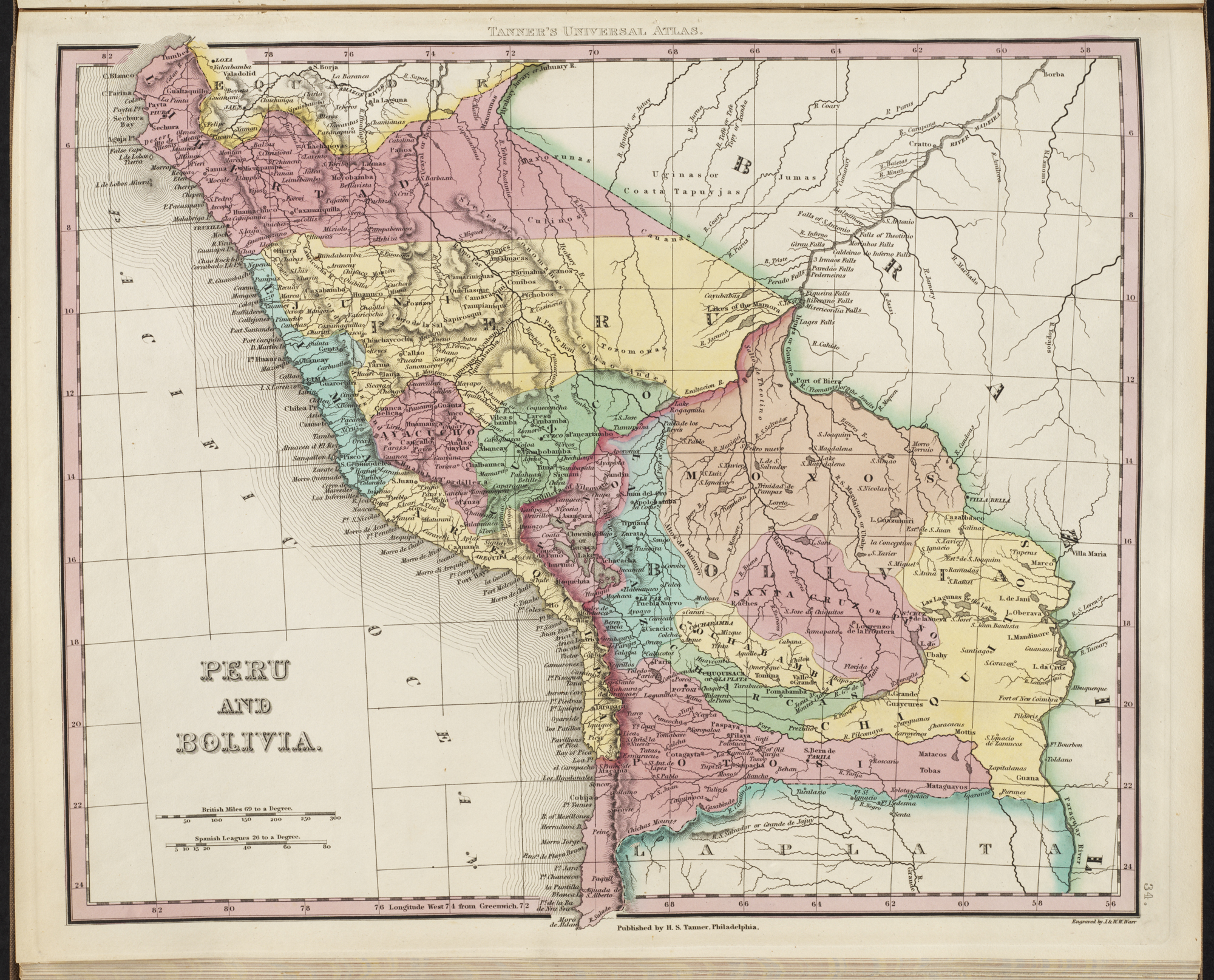
Map of Peru and Bolivia in 1836

The invasion of the Iberian Peninsula from 1807 to 1808 by Napoleon Bonaparte's forces proved to be critical for the independence struggle in South America, during which the local elites of Upper Peru mainly remained loyal to Spain, supporting Junta Central, a government which ruled in the name of the overthrown king Ferdinand VII of Spain. Many radical criollos in 1808–1810 began a local power struggle. Pedro Domingo Murillo proclaimed an independent state in Upper Peru in the name of King Ferdinand VII. During the following seven years, Upper Peru became the battleground between the armed forces of independent United Provinces of the Río de la Plata and royalist troops from Viceroyalty of Peru.

After 1820, the criollos who had formed the Conservative Party supported General Pedro Antonio de Olañeta. During the 1820–1823 liberal revolution in Spain, Olañeta, convinced that revolution threatened the traditional royal authority, refused to join the royalist forces or the rebel armies under the command of Simón Bolívar and Antonio José de Sucre. Olañeta did not relinquish his command even after the Peruvian royalists included him and his forces in the capitulation agreement following their defeat in the Battle of Ayacucho in 1824, the final battle of the wars of independence in Latin America. Olañeta continued his resistance until his men killed him on April 2, 1825.

During the 1829-39 presidency of Marshal Andrés de Santa Cruz, Bolivia enjoyed the most successful period of its early history with significant social and economic reforms. Santa Cruz got involved in Peruvian politics and succeeded in unifying Peru and Bolivia into the Peru–Bolivian Confederation.

During the War of the Confederation, Chilean and Peruvian rebel armies were forced to sign the peace treaty known as the Paucarpata Treaty, which included their unconditional surrender. Still, in 1839 Battle of Yungay, the army of Confederation was defeated. This was the turning point in Bolivian history; for the next 40 years, coups and short-lived regimes dominated Bolivian politics. Plagued by a vicious economic and political crisis, Bolivia's weakness was further demonstrated during the War of the Pacific (1879–1883), when it lost access to the ocean and the nitrate rich fields to Chile.

An increase in the world price of silver brought Bolivia a measure of relative prosperity and political stability in the late 1800s under the Conservative Party. In about 1907, tin replaced silver as the country's most important source of wealth. A succession of Liberal Party governments applied laissez-faire policies throughout the first two decades of the 20th century before the coup of the Republican Party in 1920.

== Struggle for independence ==
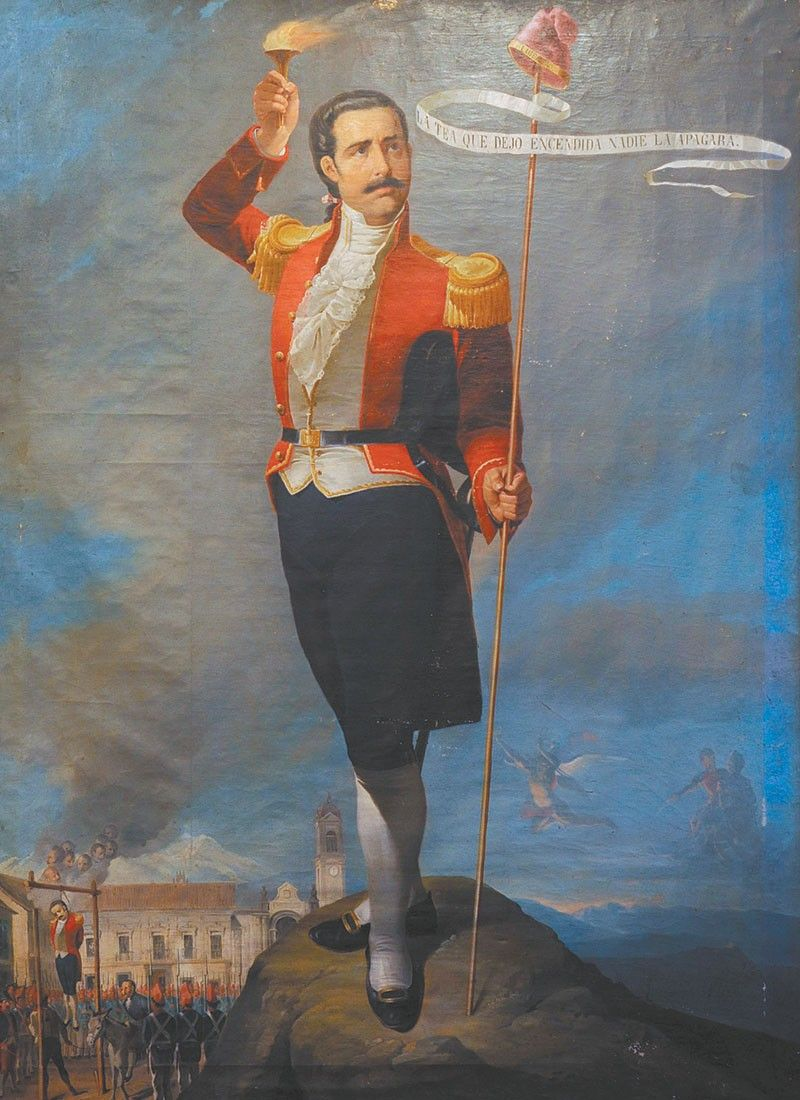
Pedro Domingo Murillo led an 1809 revolt in La Paz, claiming an independent state in Upper Peru.

The invasion of the Iberian Peninsula between 1807 and 1808 by Napoleon Bonaparte's forces proved critical for the independence struggle in South America. The overthrow of the Bourbon Dynasty and the placement of Joseph Bonaparte on the Spanish throne tested the loyalty of the local elites in Upper Peru, who were suddenly confronted with several conflicting authorities. Most remained loyal to Bourbons. Taking a wait-and-see attitude, they supported the Junta Central (Central Junta) in Spain, a government in the name of the abdicated king Ferdinand VII of Spain. While some liberals eagerly welcomed the reforms of colonial rule promised by Joseph Bonaparte, others supported the claims of Carlota, Ferdinand's sister, who governed Brazil with her husband, Prince Regent John of Portugal, and many radical criollos (persons of pure Spanish descent born in the New World) wanted independence for Upper Peru.

This conflict of authority resulted in a local power struggle in Upper Peru between 1808 and 1810 and constituted the first phase of the efforts to achieve independence. In 1808, the president of the audiencia, Ramón García León de Pizarro, demanded affiliation with the Junta Central. The conservative judges of the audiencia were influenced, however, by their autocratic royalist philosophy and refused to recognize the authority of the junta because they saw it as a product of a rebellion. On May 25, 1809, tensions grew when the radical criollos, refusing to recognize the junta because they wanted independence, took to the streets. The authorities soon put down this revolt, one of the first in Latin America.

On July 16, 1809, Pedro Domingo Murillo led another revolt by criollos and mestizos (those of mixed European and Indian ancestry) in La Paz and proclaimed an independent state in Upper Peru in the name of Ferdinand VII. The loyalty to Ferdinand was a pretense used to legitimize the independence movement. By November 1809, Cochabamba, Oruro, and Potosí had joined Murillo. Although the revolt was put down by royalist forces sent to La Paz by the viceroy of Peru and to Chuquisaca by the viceroy of Río de La Plata, Upper Peru was never again entirely controlled by Spain.

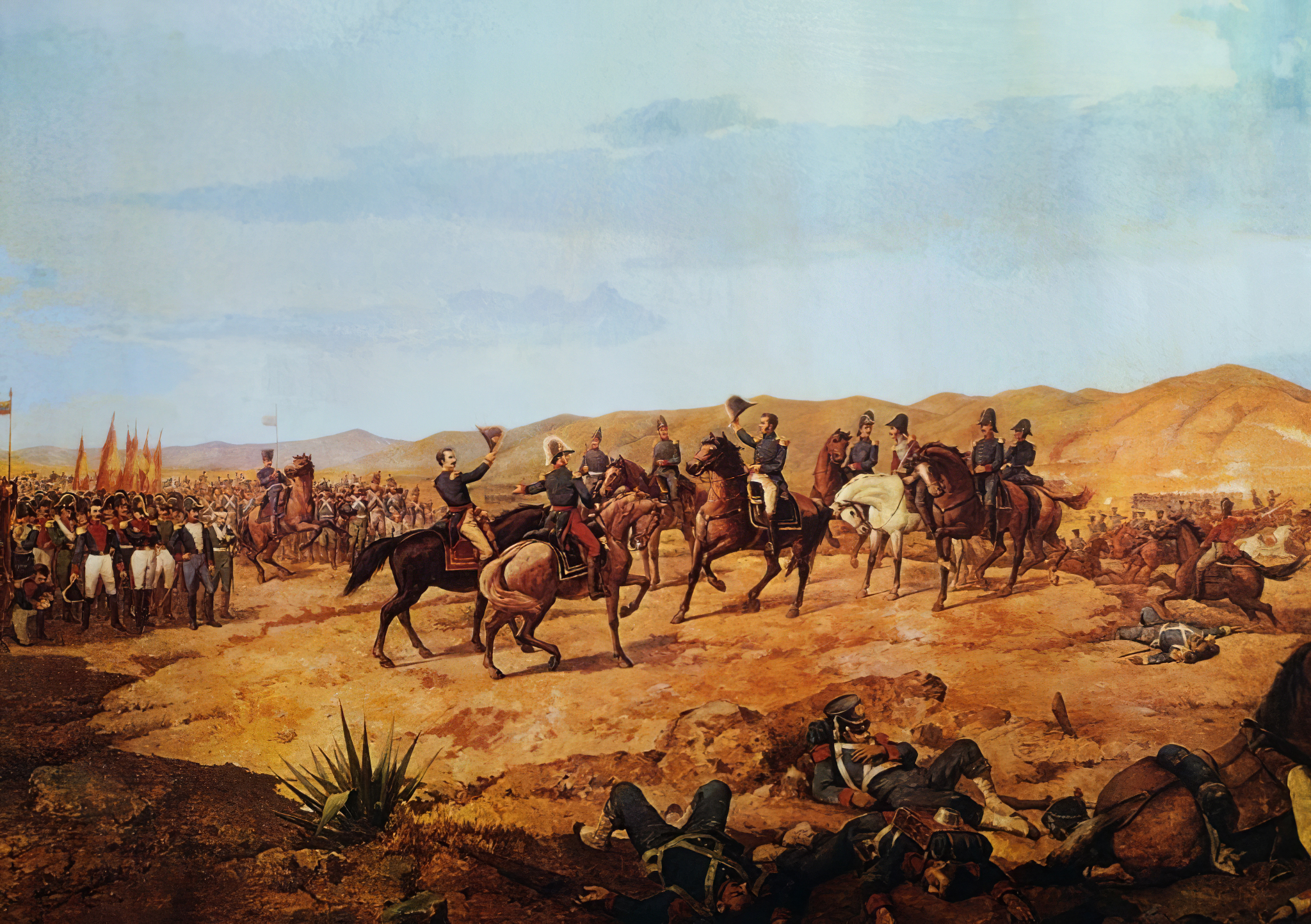
The Battle of Ayacucho was the final battle of the wars of independence in Latin America.

During the following seven years, Upper Peru became the battleground for forces of the independent United Provinces of the Río de la Plata and royalist troops from Viceroyalty of Peru. Although the royalists repulsed four Argentine invasions, guerrillas controlled most of the countryside, where they formed six significant republiquetas, or zones of insurrection. In these zones, local patriotism would eventually develop into the fight for independence.

By 1817, Upper Peru was relatively quiet and under the control of Lima. After 1820 the Conservative Party criollos supported General Pedro Antonio de Olañeta, a Charcas native, who refused to accept the measures by the Spanish Cortes (legislature) to conciliate the colonies after the liberal revolution in Spain. Olañeta, convinced that these measures threatened royal authority, refused to join the royalist forces or the rebel armies under the command of Simón Bolívar and Antonio José de Sucre. Olañeta did not relinquish his command even after the Peruvian royalists included him and his forces in the capitulation agreement following their defeat in the Battle of Ayacucho in 1824, the final battle of the wars of independence in Latin America. Olañeta continued a quixotic war until Sucre's forces defeated his forces, and he was killed by his men on April 1, 1825, in a battle that effectively ended Spanish rule in Upper Peru.

== Creating Bolivia: Bolívar, Sucre, and Santa Cruz ==
State of Upper Peru (1825) Estado del Alto Perú Republic of Bolívar (1825) República de Bolívar Republic of Bolivia República de Bolivia
- 1825–1836
- Flag Coat of arms

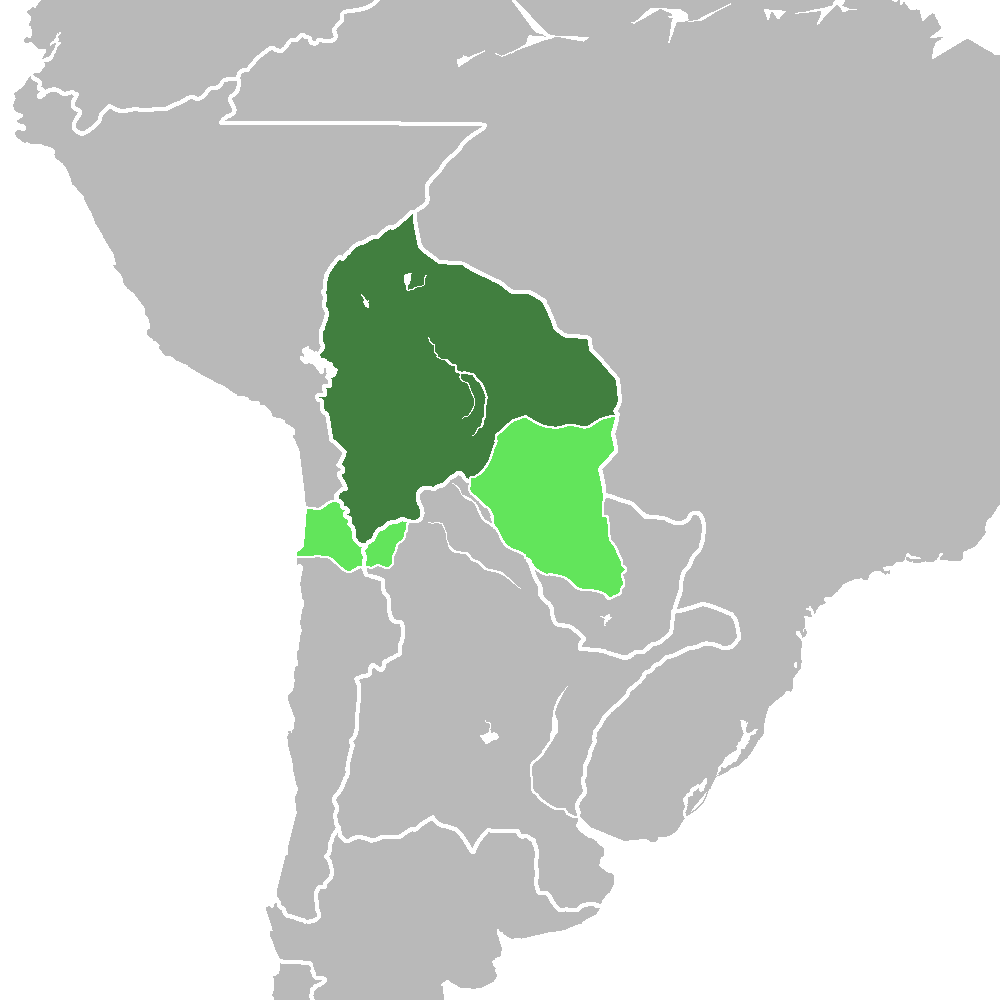
- Bolivian territory Territories later claimed
- Government: Presidential republic
- President
  - 1825: Simón Bolívar
  - 1825–1828: Antonio José de Sucre
  - 1828–1829: Pedro Blanco Soto
  - 1829–1836: Andrés de Santa Cruz
- History
  - Bolivian War of Independence: 25 May 1809
  - Established: 6 August 1825
  - Disestablished: 28 October 1836
| Preceded by | Succeeded by |
| Viceroyalty of Peru; 1828: Upper Peru | Peru–Bolivian Confederation; 1828: Upper Peru |

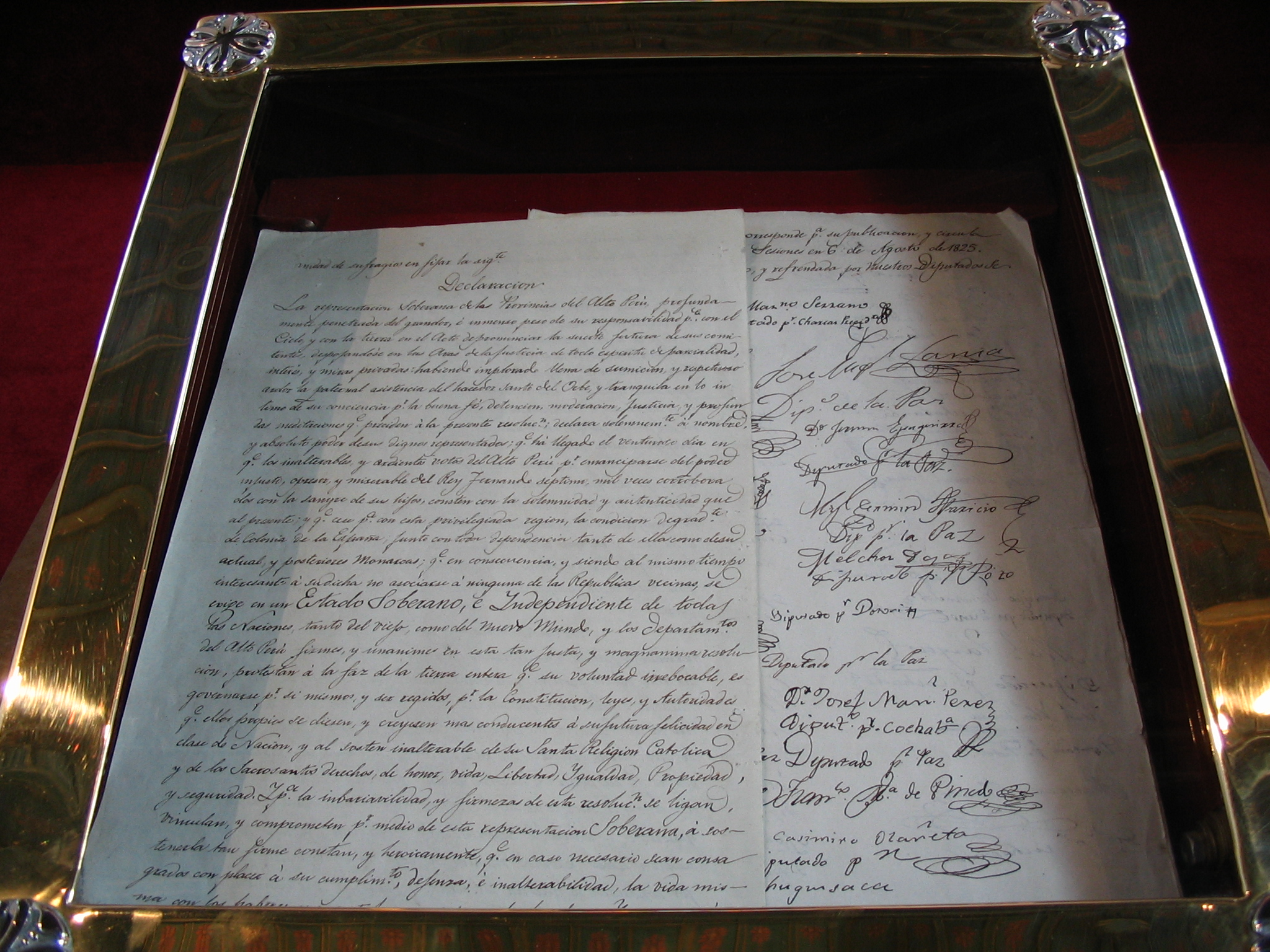
Bolivian Declaration of Independence

On August 6, 1825, the assembly adopted the Bolivian Declaration of Independence. Five days later, the assembly, hoping to placate Bolívar's reservations about the independence of Upper Peru, resolved to name the new nation after him. Simon Bolívar entered La Paz triumphantly on August 8, 1825. During his brief rule of less than five months, he issued a flood of decrees, (Note: Among other things Bolivar nationalized all abandoned, flooded or collapsed mines in what was to be Bolivia.) resolutions, and orders reflecting his ideas about government. He declared the equality of all citizens and abolished the tribute payments, replacing them with a "direct contribution" (contribución directa) that amounted to less than half of the previous payments. Bolívar also decreed a land reform to distribute land, preferably to Indians, and tried to reduce the influence of the Roman Catholic Church in politics. Most of his decrees could not be implemented during his short tenure. Still, they were included in the constitution he wrote for Bolivia after his departure in January 1826.

Despite his efforts at reform, Bolívar was outspoken about his doubts about the ability of Bolivians to govern themselves. He was careful to avoid recognizing Bolivia's independence, constantly referring to the country as Upper Peru and signing his decrees as dictator of Peru. Only in January 1826, when he turned the country over to Sucre, did he promise that the Peruvian legislature would approve Bolivia's independence.

Bolívar transferred his authority over Upper Peru to his lieutenant Antonio José de Sucre, formally installed as Bolivia's first elected president after the General Constituent Assembly convened in May and elected him. Sucre convened the Constituent Assembly in Chuquisaca to determine the region's future. Almost all delegates wanted an independent Upper Peru and rejected attachment to Argentina or Peru.

The new republic, created in the territory of the Audencia of Charcas, faced profound problems. The wars of independence had disrupted the economy. The entire mining industry was in decline because of the destruction, flooding, and abandonment of mines. Lack of investment and labor scarcity contributed to a sharp drop in silver production. Agricultural production was low, and Bolivia had to import food, even the basic staples consumed by the Indian population. The government had serious financial difficulties because of the huge military expenditures and debt payments to Peru as compensation for the army of liberation. All these problems were aggravated by the isolation of the new republic from the outside world and the difficulties of securing its borders.

During Sucre's three-year rule, governed by the Bolivian Constitution of 1826, the government tried to solve its grave financial problems, aggravated by the lack of foreign credit. Sucre reformed the existing tax structure to finance public expenditures and tried to revive silver mining by attracting foreign capital and technology. In one of the most radical attacks on the church anywhere in Latin America, he confiscated church wealth in Bolivia and closed down many monasteries. The Roman Catholic Church in Bolivia never recovered the powerful role that it had held. Import duties and taxes on the internal movement of goods were also important state revenue sources. In addition, Sucre reestablished Indian chief's tribute payments to solve the country's financial crisis.

Sucre's attempts at reform were only partially successful because Bolivia lacked the administration to carry them out. Many Conservative Party criollos turned away when his reforms threatened to challenge the economic and social patterns of the colonial past. As opposition increased, the local nationalist elite came to resent the leadership of their Venezuelan-born president. The invasion of Bolivia by the Peruvian general Agustín Gamarra and an assassination attempt in April 1828 led to Sucre's resignation. Sucre left the country for voluntary exile, convinced that "the solution was impossible".

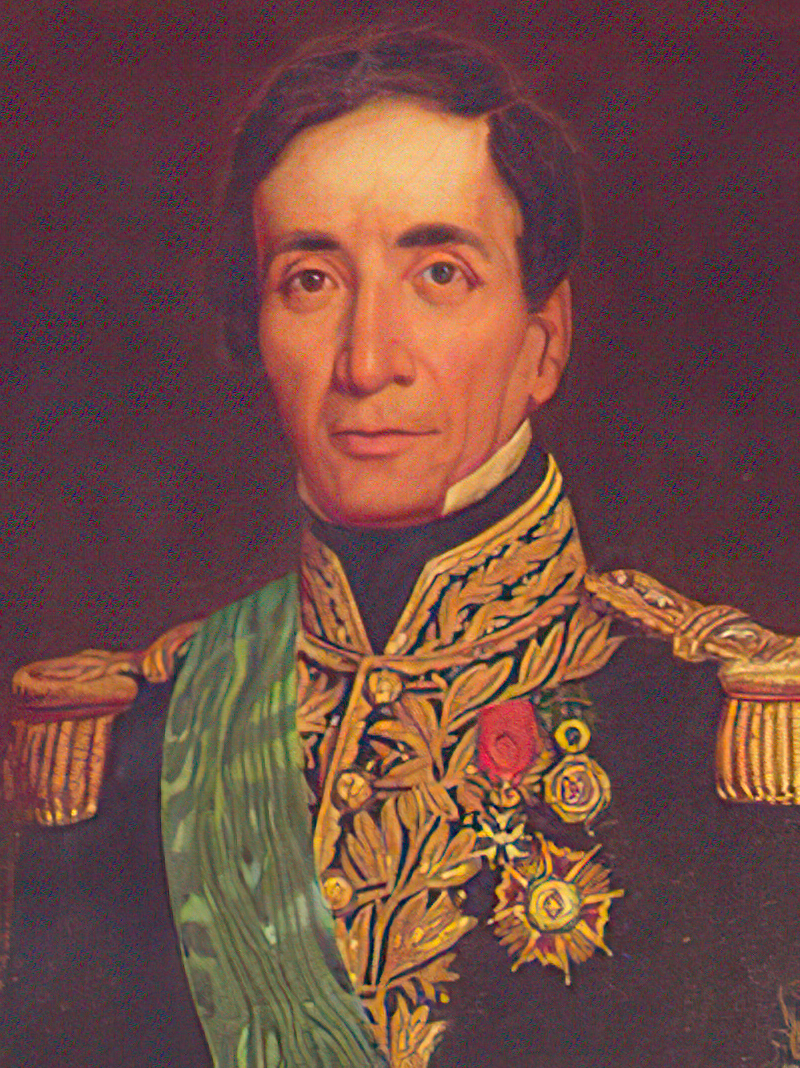
Andrés de Santa Cruz y Calahumana was Bolivia's first locally-born president.

Despite the fall of his government, Sucre's policies formed the basis for the following ten-year rule of Andrés de Santa Cruz y Calahumana (1829–39), the first native-born president, who was sworn into office in May 1829 after a series of short-term rulers. Santa Cruz, a mestizo, had a brilliant military career fighting for independence in the armies of Bolívar. His close connection with Bolívar had led to a short interlude as the president of Peru in 1826. After Sucre's resignation, it also made him a strong candidate to become Bolivia's new president.

Santa Cruz created a relatively stable economic, social, and political order in Bolivia. To overcome Bolivia's isolation, Santa Cruz opened the port of Cobija on the Pacific coast. He also devalued the silver currency to finance government activities, instituted protective tariffs in support of the local cotton cloth (tucuyo) industry, and reduced the mining tax, thereby increasing mining output. In addition, Santa Cruz codified the country's laws and enacted Latin America's first civil and commercial codes. The Higher University of San Andrés in La Paz was founded during his rule. Although Santa Cruz approved a democratic constitution, he ruled virtually as a dictator and did not tolerate opposition.

Location of the Peru–Bolivian Confederation

Santa Cruz continued his political ambitions in Peru while president of Bolivia. He established the Peru–Bolivian Confederation in 1836, justifying his act with the threat of Chile's expansion to the north. This threat, together with the constant turmoil in Peru and repeated attempts by Agustín Gamarra to invade Bolivia, had made Sucre's military intervention in a Peruvian civil war in 1835 a matter of life and death for Bolivia. After winning several battles in Peru, Santa Cruz reorganized that country into two autonomous states—the Republic of North Peru and the Republic of South Peru—and joined them with Bolivia in the Peru-Bolivia Confederation with himself as Supreme protector.

The potential power of this confederation aroused the opposition of Argentina and Chile; both nations declared war on the confederation. In the initial round of hostilities, Santa Cruz managed to repel an attack by Argentina and surrounded Chilean forces at Paucarpata, where he forced the Vice Admiral Manuel Blanco Encalada to sign a peace treaty. However, the Chilean government rejected the treaty and launched a second offensive against the Confederation. Santa Cruz's decisive defeat by Chilean forces in the Battle of Yungay in January 1839, coupled with revolts in both Bolivia and Peru, resulted in the breakup of the confederation and ended the career of Bolivia's ablest nineteenth-century president. Santa Cruz went into exile in Ecuador.

== Political instability and economic decline, 1839–1879 ==
Republic of Bolivia Spanish: República de Bolivia
- 1839–1879
- Flag Coat of arms

- Bolivian territorial losses between 1867 and 1938
- Government: Presidential republic under a military dictatorship
- President
  - 1839–1841: Jose Miguel de Velasco
  - 1841–1847: José Ballivián
  - 1848–1855: Manuel Isidoro Belzu
  - 1861–1864: José María de Achá
  - 1864–1871: Mariano Melgarejo
  - 1871–1872: Agustín Morales
  - 1876–1879: Hilarión Daza
- Vice President
  - 1839–1879: List
- History
  - Established: 22 February 1839
  - Disestablished: 28 December 1879
| Preceded by | Succeeded by |
| Peru–Bolivian Confederation | Bolivia |

The Atacama border dispute between Bolivia and Chile (1825–1879)

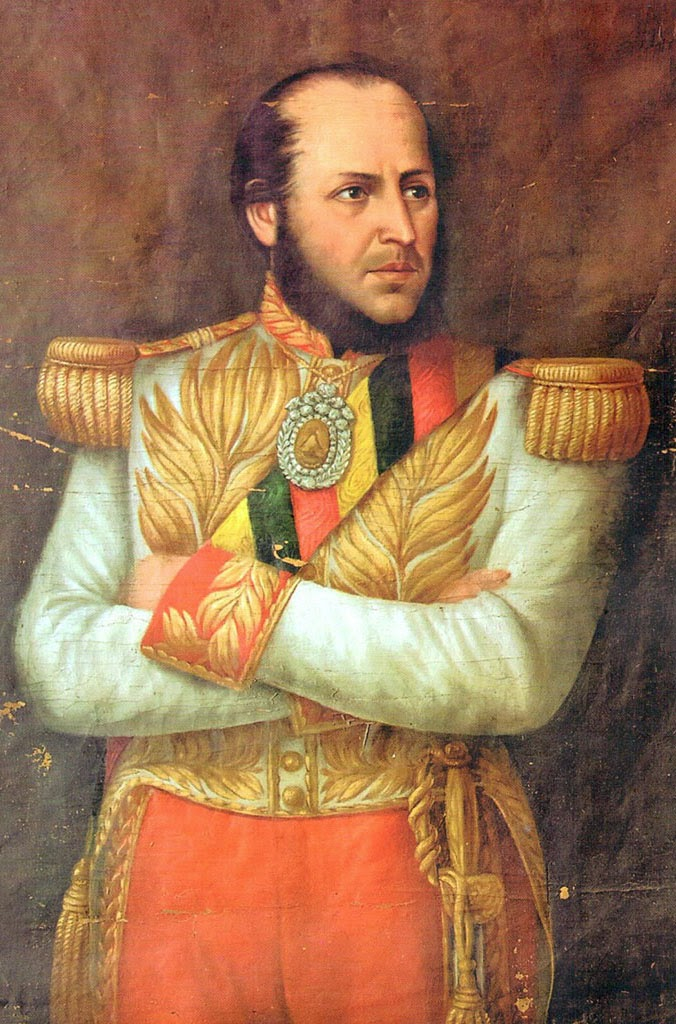
José Ballivián restored relative calm to Bolivia between 1842 and 1847.

For the next 40 years, Bolivia was characterized by a chaotic political situation and a declining economy. The country relied on taxes paid by the Indians as its main source of income. Although some of the government's leaders during this period tried to reform the country, most fit the description of caudillos bárbaros (barbaric caudillos), a term used by Bolivian writer Alcides Arguedas for inept and corrupt rulers.

Santa Cruz was succeeded in June 1839 by General José Miguel de Velasco Franco (1828, 1829, 1839–41, and 1848), who tried to control the political intrigues and maneuvering between the supporters and opponents of Santa Cruz. After failing to repel yet another invasion by Gamarra, Velasco was overthrown. Gamarra was killed in November 1841 near La Paz in the Battle of Ingavi; after the victory, Bolivia invaded Perú, and several fronts of struggle were opened in the Peruvian south.

The eviction of the Bolivian troops in the south of Peru would be achieved by the greater availability of material and human resources of Peru, the Bolivian Army did not have enough troops to maintain the occupation. In the district of Locumba–Tacna, a column between Peruvian soldiers and peasants defeated a Bolivian regiment in the so-called Battle of Los Altos de Chipe (Locumba). In the district of Sama and in Arica, the Peruvian Colonel José María Lavayén organizes a troop that manages to defeat the Bolivian forces of Colonel Rodríguez Magariños, dislodging the port of Arica. On January 7, 1842, during the Battle of Tarapacá, Peruvian militias formed by the commander Juan Buendía defeated a detachment led by Colonel José María García, who died in the confrontation. Bolivian forces subsequently retreated from Tacna, Arica, and Tarapacá in February 1842, regrouping in Moquegua and Puno. The battles of Motoni and Orurillo expelled Bolivian forces from Peruvian territory and put Bolivia at risk of a Peruvian invasion.

The Treaty of Puno officially ended the war on June 7, 1842. However, the tension between Lima and La Paz continued until 1847, when the signing of a Peace and Trade Treaty became effective.

José Ballivián (1841–1847) is remembered for restoring relative calm to the nation between 1842 and 1847. Reversing Santa Cruz's protectionist policies, Ballivián encouraged free trade. He also promoted the colonization of the Beni savanna. Nonetheless, the main income continued to come from the taxes paid by rural Indians. These included a head tax and a tax on coca leaves, consumed almost exclusively by the Indian population. Although nearly 90 percent of all Bolivians lived in rural areas, according to the 1846 census, agriculture generated little revenue. Most haciendas stagnated, and only the collection of chinchona bark (for the production of quinine) and coca leaves increased in the valleys.

After the overthrow of Ballivián in 1847, Manuel Isidoro Belzu (1848–55) emerged as the most powerful figure in Bolivia. Unlike his predecessors, Belzu sought the support of the masses. To gain the backing of the Indians, he started a campaign against the aristocratic landowners, seized their land, and incited the Indians to destroy the homes of the landowners. He also hoped to get the support of the artisans who the free-trade policies of Ballivián had hurt by restricting the role of foreign merchants in Bolivia and limiting imports.

Belzu's effort succeeded in one sense because he fended off forty-two coup attempts during his rule. "Tata" Belzu, as he was called by the Indians (like the head of the ayllu in pre-Columbian times), has been seen as the precursor of Andean populism. Attempting to stir the masses in demagogic speeches, Belzu completely alienated the Bolivian establishment with his reign of terror. As efforts to overthrow him increased, he resigned in 1855 and left for Europe.

José María Linares (1857–1861), a member of the elite that had opposed Belzu, overthrew Belzu's son-in-law, General Jorge Córdova (1855–57), and became the first civilian president. Linares reversed Belzu's protective policies and encouraged free trade and foreign investment, mainly from Britain and Chile. During his presidency, mining output increased because of technological innovations, such as the steam engine, and the discovery of huge nitrate deposits in the Atacama Desert (in present-day Chile).

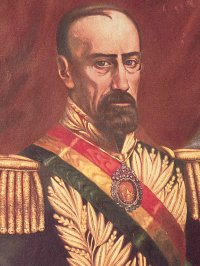
The presidency of José María Achá was one of the most violent periods in Bolivia's history.

Although the mining sector improved, it failed to stimulate agricultural production, and most haciendas continued in relative stagnation. This malaise contributed to the survival of campesino communities during the 19th century, despite repeated assaults on their common landholdings by various governments. The tax burden on the Indians resulted in campesino revolts in Copacabana.

The southeastern lowlands of Bolivia, where the autonomous Ava Guarani resided, begun a gradual but forcefull incorporation to the Bolivian state in the 1850s. The non-indigenous settlement in eastern Chuquisaca was motivated by an expansion of cattle ranching leading contributing to the conflict between settlers and the maize-farming Ava Guaraní to assume aspects of a farmer–herder conflict.

The overthrow of Linares by a military coup in 1861 initiated one of the most violent periods in Bolivian history under the rule of General José María Achá (1861–64). Achá is remembered for the 1861 "murders of Yáñez", the massacre of seventy-one Belzú supporters (Belcistas), including General Córdova by Colonel Plácido Yáñez, the military commander in La Paz.

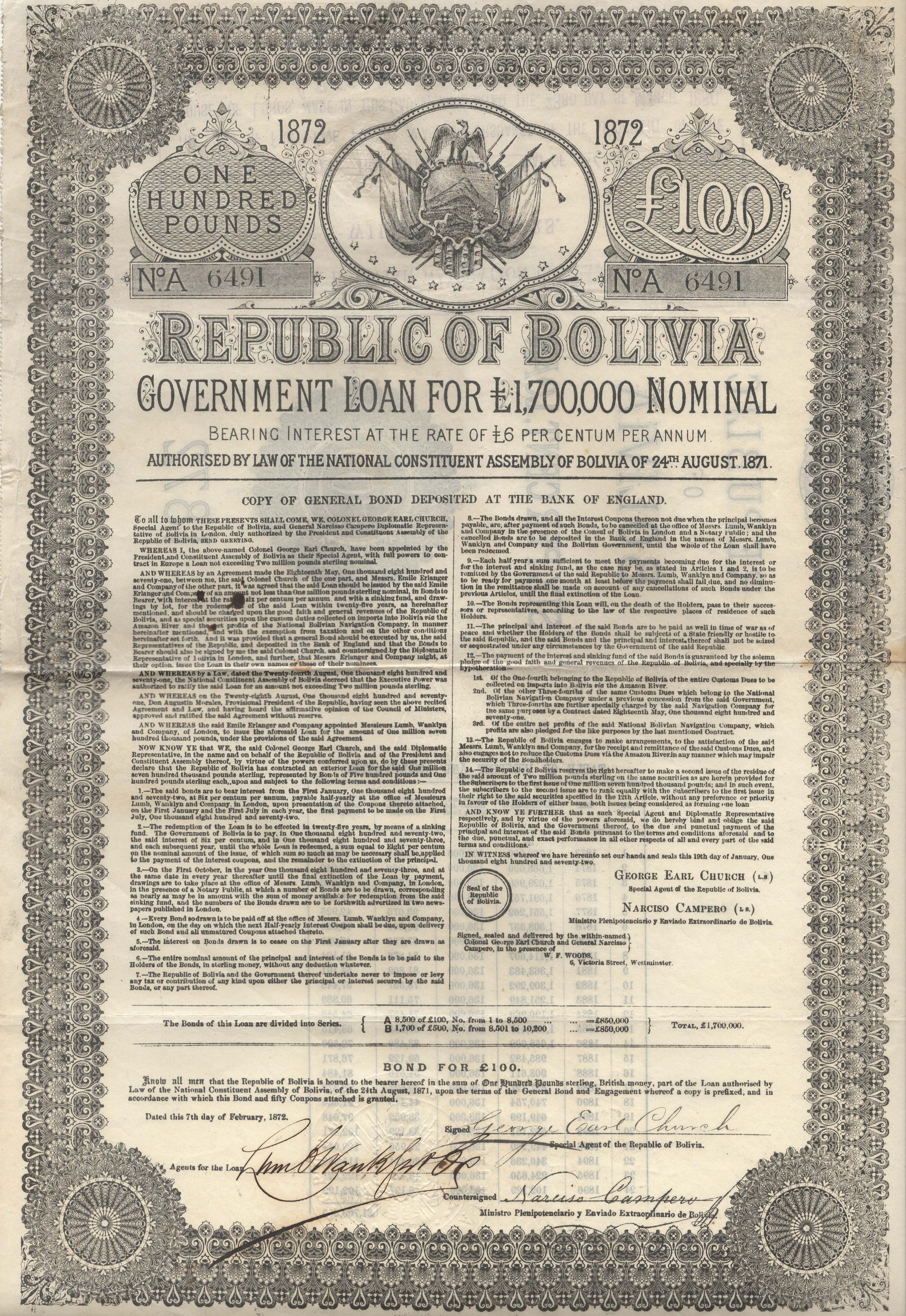
Government Loan of the Republic of Bolivia, issued 24 August 1871

In late 1864, General Mariano Melgarejo (1864–1871) seized the presidency and became the most notorious of Bolivia's caudillos. Relying primarily on the military, he remained in power for more than six years despite his mismanagement, drunkenness, corruption, and constant intrigues against him. Hoping to improve the economy by opening up the country to foreigners, Melgarejo signed a series of free trade treaties with Chile and Peru. In an 1867 treaty with Empire of Brazil to secure water rights to the Atlantic Ocean, he ceded 102,400 square kilometers of territory, hoping to break Bolivia's isolation.

Melgarejo started a formidable assault on Indian communal land, ostensibly to improve agricultural production. He decreed that Indians could become owners of their parcels if they paid a hefty fee within sixty days. If they failed to do so, their land would be auctioned off. The resulting land sales increased the size of the haciendas, and massive Indian uprisings against his rule became more violent. Opposition against Melgarejo mounted in all sectors of society as the term melgarejismo came to signify amoral militarism; in 1871, he was overthrown and later murdered in Lima.

Agustín Morales (1871–1872) continued Melgarejo's ruling style despite his promise of "more liberty and less government". Morales was killed by his nephew in 1872.

Two presidents with high integrity, Tomás Frías Ametller (1872–1873) and General Adolfo Ballivián (1873–1874), did not last long because of constant intrigues. Under their rule, Bolivia opened the port of Mollendo, reducing the country's isolation by connecting the Altiplano by train and steamship on Lake Titicaca to the Pacific coast.

In 1876, Hilarión Daza (1876–1879) seized power and became another military caudillo, as brutal and incompetent as Melgarejo. He faced many insurrections, a massive demonstration by artisans in Sucre, and widespread opposition. Hoping to gather the support of nationalist Bolivians to strengthen his internal position, Daza involved his country in the disastrous War of the Pacific.

== War of the Pacific ==
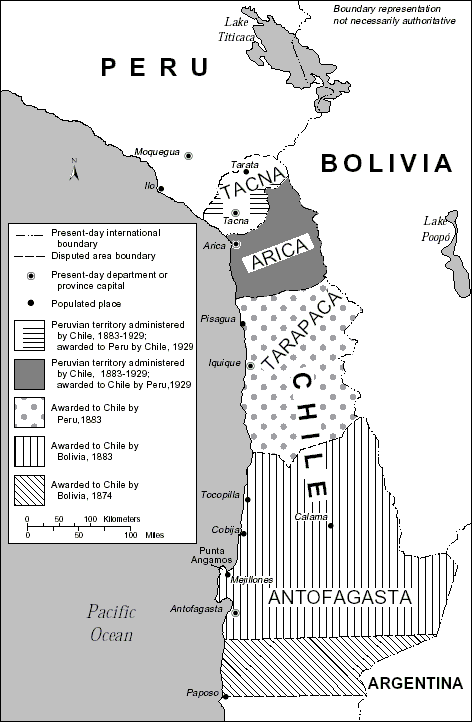
Territorial changes after the War of the Pacific

The War of the Pacific resulted from a dispute between Bolivia and Chile over sovereignty of the mineral-rich coastal area of the Atacama Desert. In the mid-1860s, the two nations came to the brink of war because of disagreement over their boundaries there. In 1874, Chile agreed to fix the border at a latitude of 24° south in return for Bolivia's promise not to increase taxes on Chilean nitrate enterprises for twenty-five years. In 1878, Hilarión Daza imposed a 10-cent tax on every 100 pounds of nitrates exported from Bolivia. British and Chilean-owned Nitrates and Railroad Company of Antofagasta objected. Daza initially suspended the tax instead of an annual fee but decided to reimpose the tax. Chileans responded by mobilizing their fleet. When Daza canceled the company's mining contract, Chile landed troops in Antofagasta harbor on February 14, 1879.

In alliance with Peru, Bolivia declared war on Chile on March 14, but Bolivia's troops in the coastal territory were quickly defeated partly because of Daza's military incompetence. On December 27, 1879, a coup led by Colonel Eliodoro Camacho overthrew Daza, who fled to Europe with a sizable portion of Bolivia's treasury.

The attempt of General Narciso Campero (1880–84) to come to the aid of Peru, Bolivia's war ally, was unsuccessful, and Chile defeated the combined armies in May 1880. Having lost its entire coastal territory, Bolivia withdrew from the war, while the war between Chile and Peru continued for three more years.

Bolivia officially ceded the coastal territory to Chile only twenty-four years later, under the 1904 Treaty of Peace and Friendship.

The War of the Pacific was a turning point in Bolivian history. Bolivian politicians were able to rally Bolivians by blaming the war on Chilean aggression. Bolivian writers were convinced that Chile's victory would help Bolivia to overcome its backwardness because the defeat strengthened the "national soul". Even today, the landlocked Bolivia has not relinquished the hope of regaining an outlet to the Pacific Ocean.

== Rise of Conservative and Liberal parties ==
After the war, a vigorous debate among the civilian elites spawned the development of two new political parties. Silver mining entrepreneurs, who had become the most important economic group in the country, created the Conservative Party (Partido Conservador) led by Mariano Baptista, a vocal opponent of the War of the Pacific. Conservatives favored reaching a quick peace settlement with Chile, including a financial indemnity for the lost territories and enabling Bolivia to construct a railroad for continued mining exports. The Liberal Party (Partido Liberal) was founded in 1883 by the former chief of staff, General Eliodoro Camacho, and was more hawkish, as it denounced the pacifism of the Conservatives and any peace treaty with Chile. Liberals also resented the dependence of the mining industry on Chilean and British capital and hoped to attract United States investments.

Conservatives adopted a new Constitution of Bolivia in 1878, which created a unitary state and made Roman Catholicism the state religion, while Liberals championed a secular and federal state model.

Despite these differences, both parties were primarily interested in political and economic modernization, and their ideological outlooks were similar. Civilian politicians reorganized, reequipped, and professionalized the discredited armed forces and tried to subject them to civilian control. Still, both Conservatives and Liberals initially supported military candidates for the presidency. The governments in power from 1880 to 1920—elected by a small, literate, and Spanish-speaking electorate of less than 30,000—brought Bolivia its first relative political stability and prosperity.

== Reconstruction under the rule of the Conservatives, 1880–1899 ==
Republic of Bolivia Spanish: República de Bolivia
- 1880–1899
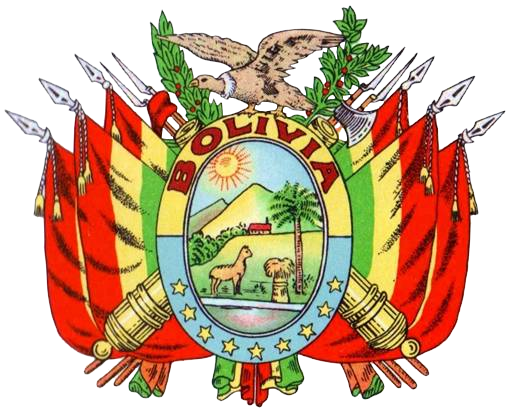
- Flag Coat of arms

- Bolivian territorial losses between 1867 and 1938
- Government: Conservative presidential republic
- President
  - 1880–1884: Narciso Campero
  - 1884–1888: Gregorio Pacheco
  - 1888–1892: Aniceto Arce
  - 1892–1896: Mariano Baptista
  - 1896–1899: Severo Fernández
- Vice President
  - 1880–1899: List
- History
  - Established: 19 January 1880
  - Disestablished: 12 April 1899
| Preceded by | Succeeded by |
| Bolivia | Bolivia |

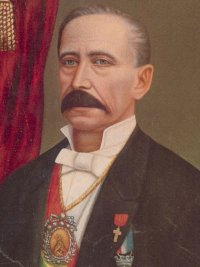
Gregorio Pacheco, one of Bolivia's most important mine owners, served as President from 1884 to 1888.

The Conservatives ruled Bolivia from 1880 until 1899. In 1880, the Constitution of 1878 was reaffirmed and remained in force until 1938.

General Campero completed his legal term in office and presided over elections of 1884 that brought to power Gregorio Pacheco (1884–88), leader of the Democratic Party and one of Bolivia's richest mine owners. During this time, only 30,000 Bolivians had the right to vote. After Pachecho's term, fraudulent elections resulted in Liberal revolts in October 1888, May 1890, and 1892. Although the Liberal Party was allowed to win seats in the National Congress of Bolivia, it had no chance to win a presidential election.

Under the Conservatives, the high world price of silver and increased production of copper, lead, zinc, and tin combined to create a period of relative prosperity. The Conservative governments encouraged the mining industry by developing a rail network to the Pacific coast. The growth of commercial agriculture, such as developing Bolivia's natural rubber resources, also contributed to a stronger economy. Agricultural production in the highlands increased as the haciendas expanded in some regions.

Another millionaire Aniceto Arce (1888–1892), although elected legally in elections of 1888, was an autocrat who managed to stay in power only through repression. His main economic accomplishment was to extend the Antofagasta-Calama Railroad to Oruro. The railroad extension drastically reduced the cost of transporting minerals to the Pacific coast. Economic growth was skewed, as railroads that were built to export minerals started to bring imported wheat from Chile; in 1890, Chilean wheat was cheaper in La Paz than wheat from Cochabamba. The open economy also hurt local industries.

The expansion of the haciendas at the expense of the free Indian communities resulted in numerous uprisings. It forced many Indians to work for their landlords or to migrate to the cities. As a result of this migration, the census of 1900 noted an increase in the mestizo population. Still, Bolivia remained a predominantly Indian and rural nation, in which the Spanish-speaking minority continued to exclude the Indians.

== The Liberal Party and the rise of tin, 1899–1920 ==
Republic of Bolivia Spanish: República de Bolivia
- 1899–1920
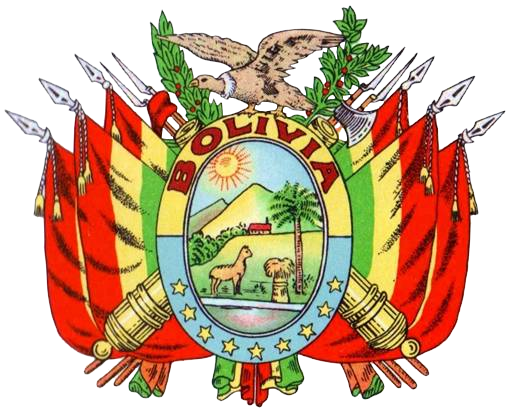
- Flag Coat of arms

- Bolivian territorial losses between 1867 and 1938
- Capital: La Paz
- Government: Liberal presidential republic
- President
  - 1899-1904: José Manuel Pando
  - 1904-1909/1913-1917: Ismael Montes
  - 1909-1913: Eliodoro Villazón
  - 1917-1920: José Gutiérrez Guerra
- Vice President
  - 1899-1920: List
- History
  - Established: 25 October 1899
  - Disestablished: 12 July 1920
| Preceded by | Succeeded by |
| Bolivia | Bolivia |

In 1899, the Liberal Party overthrew the Conservative president Severo Fernández in the "Federal Revolution". Although the Liberals resented the long rule of the Conservatives, the main reasons for the revolt were regionalism and federalism. The Liberal Party drew most of its support from the tin-mining entrepreneurs in and around La Paz. In contrast, Conservative governments had ruled with an eye on the interests of the silver mine owners and great landowners in Potosí and Sucre. The immediate cause of the conflict was the Liberal demand to move the capital from Sucre to the more developed La Paz.

Since independence, Bolivia has lost over half of its territory to neighboring countries. Through diplomatic channels in 1909, it lost the basin of the Madre de Dios River and the territory of the Purus in the Amazon, yielding 250,000 km^{2} to Peru

The Federal Revolution differed from previous revolts in Bolivia in that Indian peasants actively participated in the fighting. Indian discontent had increased because of the massive assault on their communal landholdings. The campesinos supported the Liberal leader, José Manuel Pando (1899–1904), when he promised to improve their situation. His follower, President Ismael Montes (1904–1909 and 1913–1917) dominated the Liberal era.

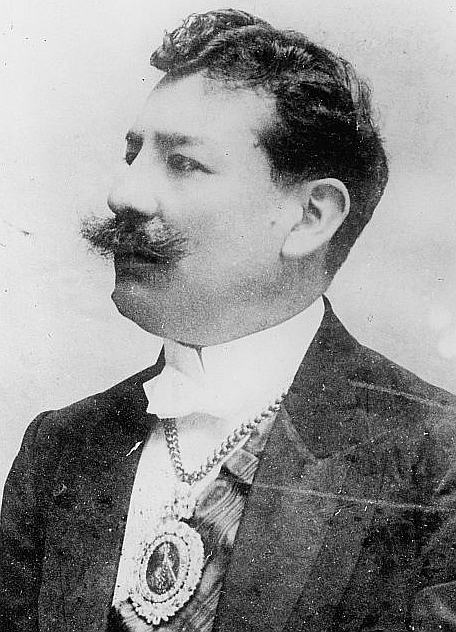
President Ismael Montes dominated the Liberal era.

Pando, however, reneged on his promises and allowed the assault on Indian land to continue. The government suppressed a series of campesino uprisings and executed the leaders. One of these revolts, led by Pablo Zárate (Willka), was one of the largest Indian rebellions in the history of the republic, frightened whites and mestizos, who once again successfully isolated the Indians from national life.

Like their Conservative predecessors, the Liberals controlled the presidential elections but left the elections for the Congress relatively free.

They also continued to professionalize the Bolivian military with the aid of a German military mission. German officers led the School of War and Military College from 1901. German and French artillery was purchased between 1901 and 1907. French military officers were invited between 1907 and 1910 and then again followed by Germans. In 1907, compulsory military service was introduced. The former head of Germany's mission, Colonel Hans Kundt, became the head of the General staff and later Minister of War. Kundt became involved with the Republican Party and provided it with the army's loyalty during the 1920 coup, after which he purged many Liberal officers. He was later recalled to Bolivia in 1932 to lead the army during the Chaco War.

Liberal administrations gave priority to the settlement of border disputes. Bolivia's inability to protect and integrate the frontier with Brazil had led to the encroachment of Brazilian rubber gatherers. In 1900, they began an active secessionist movement in the eastern province of Acre and, after three years of small-scale fighting, were annexed by Brazil. In the Treaty of Petropolis in 1903, Bolivia relinquished its claims to 191,000 square kilometers of Acre territory in return for two areas on the Madeira and the Paraguay rivers totaling 5,200 square kilometers, the equivalent of US$10 million, and the use of a railroad to be constructed around the rapids of the Madeira in Brazilian territory.

In 1904, Bolivia finally concluded a peace treaty with Chile, under which it officially ceded Bolivia's former territory on the Pacific coast in return for indemnification of US$8.5 million, less the value of the Bolivian section of a new railroad that Chile would construct from La Paz to the Pacific Coast at Arica. The payment was used to expand the transportation system in Bolivia. By 1920, most major Bolivian cities were connected by rail.

Liberal governments also changed the seat of government and the nature of church-state relations. The presidency and the Congress were moved to La Paz, which became the de facto capital, but the Supreme Court remained in Sucre. Liberal presidents canceled the special privileges officially granted to the Roman Catholic Church; in 1905, they legalized public worship by other faiths, and in 1911, they made civil marriage a requirement.

Perhaps the most significant development of the Liberal era was the dramatic rise of Bolivian tin production. Since the colonial period, tin had been mined in the Potosí region; nonetheless, Bolivia historically lacked the transportation system necessary to ship large quantities of tin to European markets. However, the extension of the rail link to Oruro in the 1890s made tin mining a highly profitable business. The decline in European tin production also contributed to the Bolivian tin boom at the beginning of the 20th century. With the development of huge mines in southern Oruro and northern Potosí, La Paz eclipsed Potosí as the mining industry's financial and service center.

Tin production in Bolivia came to be concentrated in the hands of Bolivian nationals, although the regimes encouraged foreign investment. At first, foreign interests and Bolivians with foreign associations took the major share. This changed, however, when Bolivian tin-mining entrepreneurs realized that smelters in competing countries depended on Bolivian tin. Simón Patiño was the most successful of these tin magnates. He had a poor mestizo background and started as a mining apprentice. By 1924, he owned 50% of the national production and controlled the European refining of Bolivian tin. Although Patiño lived permanently abroad by the early 1920s, the two other leading tin-mining entrepreneurs, Carlos Aramayo and Mauricio Hochschild, resided primarily in Bolivia.

Because taxes and fees from tin production were critically important to national revenues, Patiño, Aramayo, and Hochschild exercised considerable influence over government policy. Unlike the silver-mining entrepreneurs of the Conservative period, the tin-mining magnates did not directly intervene in politics but employed politicians and lawyers—known as the rosca—to represent their interests.

The tin boom also contributed to increased social tensions. Indian peasants, who provided most of the labor for the mines, moved from their rural communities to the rapidly growing mining towns, where they lived and worked in precarious situations. Bolivia's First National Congress of Workers met in La Paz in 1912, and the mining centers witnessed an increasing number of strikes in the following years.

Liberal governments at first did not face any serious opposition because the Conservative Party remained weak after its overthrow in 1899. By 1915 a faction of Liberals (including ex-president Pando) who were opposed to the loss of national territory, split from the Liberal party and formed the Republican Party (Partido Republicano). Republican support increased when mineral exports declined because of the crisis in international trade before World War I, and agricultural production decreased because of severe droughts. In 1917, the Republicans were defeated at the polls when José Gutiérrez Guerra (1917–20) was elected as the last Liberal president.

The rule of the Liberals, one of the most stable periods in Bolivian history, ended when the Republicans led by Bautista Saavedra seized the presidency in a bloodless coup of 1920.

== See also ==
- List of presidents of Bolivia
