= Pedro Blanco Soto =

Bolivian general and politician (1795–1829)

- Portrait by Antonio Villavicencio, Museo de Charcas, Sucre

5th President of Bolivia
- Provisional
- In office 26 December 1828 – 1 January 1829
- Vice President: José Ramón de Loayza
- Preceded by: José Ramón de Loayza (acting)
- Succeeded by: José Miguel de Velasco (acting)

Personal details
- Born: Pedro Blanco Soto; 19 October 1795 Cochabamba, Viceroyalty of the Río de la Plata (now Bolivia)
- Died: 1 January 1829 (aged 33) Sucre, Bolivia
- Manner of death: Assassination
- Party: Independent
- Other political affiliations: Affiliated with the Gamarraistas; Peruvianist Party
- Spouse: Ana Ferrufino
- Parent(s): José Manuel Blanco; Vicenta Soto
- Relatives: Carlos Blanco Galindo (great-grandson)

Pedro Blanco Soto (19 October 1795 – 1 January 1829) was a Bolivian soldier and politician and president of the Republic of Upper Peru, an unrecognized entity that emerged in the limits of the department of La Paz and, which claimed the territory of the Republic of Bolivia. He held the position for a short time before being killed by his opponents in a convent called La Recoletta in Sucre on New Year's Day 1829. A small plaque now marks the spot in the Museo de la Recoletta. He was well known for his pro-Peruvian stance and this is generally the reason attributed to his assassination. He was also a distinguished officer during the Peruvian War of Independence.

== Early Military Career ==
Blanco, son of José Manuel Blanco and Vicenta Soto was born in the city of Cochabamba, Bolivia on October 19, 1795. At the age of 17 he enlisted in the royalist army participating in the campaign against the Argentine patriots in his native Upper Peru, soon He stood out in the cavalry as part of the Mounted Hunters squadron, he was promoted to lieutenant after the battle of Vilcapugio, and to captain after Viluma.

With the landing of the expedition of San Martín, the squadron in which Captain Blanco served was displaced to Lower Peru. It was during the 1823 campaign which would notably distinguish himself to the point of receiving a special mention for his courage in the report of General Jerónimo Valdés, given that during the skirmishes prior to the Battle of Torata, Captain Blanco, in command of only 35 mounted hunters, he had fought against the enemy vanguard, killing an independence officer with his sword. He then dismounted from his horse in the middle of the crossfire to pick up his competitor's sword and hat. For this action, he was given a gift from the hands of Valdés himself in the presence of the entire royalist division. This gift was a beautiful saber that had been taken from the Argentine commander Gregorio Aráoz de Lamadrid during a skirmish in Upper Peru and that Valdez kept to reward the first trait of extraordinary value.

== In the patriot army ==
=== In the Peruvian Army of Liberation ===
Despite his promising career in the royal army, like many other American officers he defected to the pro-independence side, although a few days later he was already a member of the patriot army, fighting the rest of the campaign against the army in which he had served until then and in the that a brother of his was still training as an assistant to Brigadier Valdés, incorporated into the Peruvian army, he made the second intermediate campaign under the command of General Andrés de Santa Cruz, finding himself in the battle of Zepita for which Santa Cruz was appointed marshal. When General Santa Cruz withdrew in defeat from Upper Peru, he led a party of scattered soldiers who joined the army of the patriotic leader José Miguel Lanza to fight under his orders in Alzuri against the forces of General Olañeta where, despite their courage, they were defeated by the best equipped royalist troops, after this action he returned to Lima to join the united army of Bolívar being named commander of the third squadron of Hussars of Junín who, due to their brave participation in the Battle of Junín, in which Commander Soto was recognized for his courage in the official report, were renamed by the liberator as Hussars of Junín, and that today constitute the presidential guard of Peru.

Finally, he would also fight in the decisive Battle of Ayacucho in which he was seriously wounded to the point that, believing his death certain, he told General José de la Mar, chief of his division, when he went to see him, the following: "General, I am dying, but I have the satisfaction of sealing my country's freedom with my blood." According to the memoirs of Colonel Manuel Antonio López, Commander Soto was among the more than 50 officers, mainly Peruvians, who, on the eve of the final battle, gathered in the field of Ayacucho to greet and say goodbye to his family and friends who were active in the royal army and in which his brother commanded a body of Spanish cavalry.

=== Upper Peruvian campaign ===
His wound was duly treated and once he was healed he marched to Upper Peru where Bolívar, separating Upper Peru from Lower Peru, had just created the Republic of Bolívar (now Bolivia), with the rank of General Pedro Blanco Soto entered the service of the Army of his native country. The government headed by Antonio José de Sucre maintained a large Colombian division in the country, which together with a Bolivarian government created discontent in a sector of the population and the Bolivian army. The same Colombian troops ended up revolting against the authority of Sucre, who was wounded trying to put down a mutiny in Chuquisaca. Under this situation of internal commotion, the invasion of the Peruvian army under the command of Agustín Gamarra took place, the objective of which was to force the departure of the Colombian troops from Bolivia given that they constituted a threat to Peru due to their rejection of the life presidency of Bolivar and problems bordering Gran Colombia was at the gates of a war with that country.

The division commanded by General Blanco declared in favor of the Peruvian army, on May 31 the one commanded by General Braun attacked him in Potosí but was repulsed. The bulk of the Bolivian army under the command of General José María Pérez de Urdininea, greatly diminished by the defection of chiefs and soldiers to Gamarra's army, withdrew to Oruro without a battle. The Peruvian army then occupied the cities of La Paz and Oruro. Blanco's forces went to the city of Sucre and then to Ñuccho where they arrested President Antonio José de Sucre, although he was later released by Gamarra.

On July 6, 1828, the Treaty of Piquiza was signed. In the treaty, the departure of the Gran Colombian troops through the port of Arica was agreed, in transport provided by the government of Peru, whose troops also withdrew in September of that year.

== President of Bolivia ==
=== Peruvian invasion and assassination ===
The Piquiza Treaty established the call for a Constituent Assembly, which met on December 16 and appointed General Pedro Blanco Provisional President of Bolivia, who took office on December 26, 1828. The measures adopted by this new government was not to the liking of the most factions of the Bolivian military, especially one headed by Colonel José Ballivián, who five days later deposed Blanco.

With his arm in a sling, Blanco was taken prisoner to the Recoleta convent where he was killed by the guards on January 1, 1829. Pedro Blanco went down in Bolivian history as the president who ruled for only six days, his government being the shortest of all presidents. According to Francisco Burdett O'Connor in his Recuerdos, the events unfolded as follows:

There were rumors, of course, that General Blanco had been assassinated by the orders of the captain of the National Guard and that the first Chief of First Battalion, Colonel José Ballivian. In fact, many suppose it that way until now in Chuquisaca; however, finding myself in Peru in the year 1836 with the Bolivian Army... Lieutenant Colonel Prudencio Deheza, the same one who commanded the guard corps in the Recoleta convent of Chuquisaca the night of the cruel assassination of General Blanco, told me about that tragic event as follows: The order that was posted to the guards that day was: that in case of any attempt by the cholada [the indigenous popular masses of Bolivia] to rescue the prisoner, that he not be allowed to escape with his life. This order was read to all the troops that made up the guard; and that same night, at midnight, the sentinel stationed in the corridor, sounded the alarm, and stated that groups of cholos were approaching the high wall in front of the convent. All guards armed themselves, and Deheza set up in his designated position. All this happened next to the cell in which the unfortunate General Blanco was imprisoned. With a sentinel at the door and another inside the same cell. At this time, Blanco was sleeping on a pallet in his cell, and hearing the noise in the corridor he was awaken. He was going to the door to see what was happening, when the sentinel in sight pushed him with his bayonet onto the pallet and shot him. The captain of the guard entered the cell and the sentinel told him that the prisoner had tried to escape; the gatekeeper also entered the cell, and shot Blanco a second time. Deheza then entered and finished him off with his sword.

The Spanish historian Mariano Torrente, in his work dedicated to the Spanish-American wars of independence, referring in one of his passages to Blanco, would say: "it is certainly sensitive that such a commendable officer would have been successively sacrificed to the fury of those he freed".

=== Economic policies ===
During his administration, economic development policies were promoted. Investment in infrastructure was encouraged and the exploitation of natural resources was incentivized. Establishment of measures to promote agricultural and livestock production. Creation of industrial and commercial development policies. Implementation of educational reforms to promote education throughout the country. Boosting infrastructure, with the construction of roads and public works. One of the highlights of Blanco's administration was his focus on strengthening the Bolivian economy. To achieve this, he implemented measures such as promoting agriculture and mining, encouraging the production and export of agricultural and mineral products. He also promoted the construction of key infrastructure to facilitate trade and transportation.

Political offices
Preceded by José Ramón de Loayza; Provisional acting	President of Bolivia; 1828–1829	Succeeded by José Miguel de Velasco; Acting
