= José Ramón de Loayza =

Vice president of Bolivia from 1828 to 1828

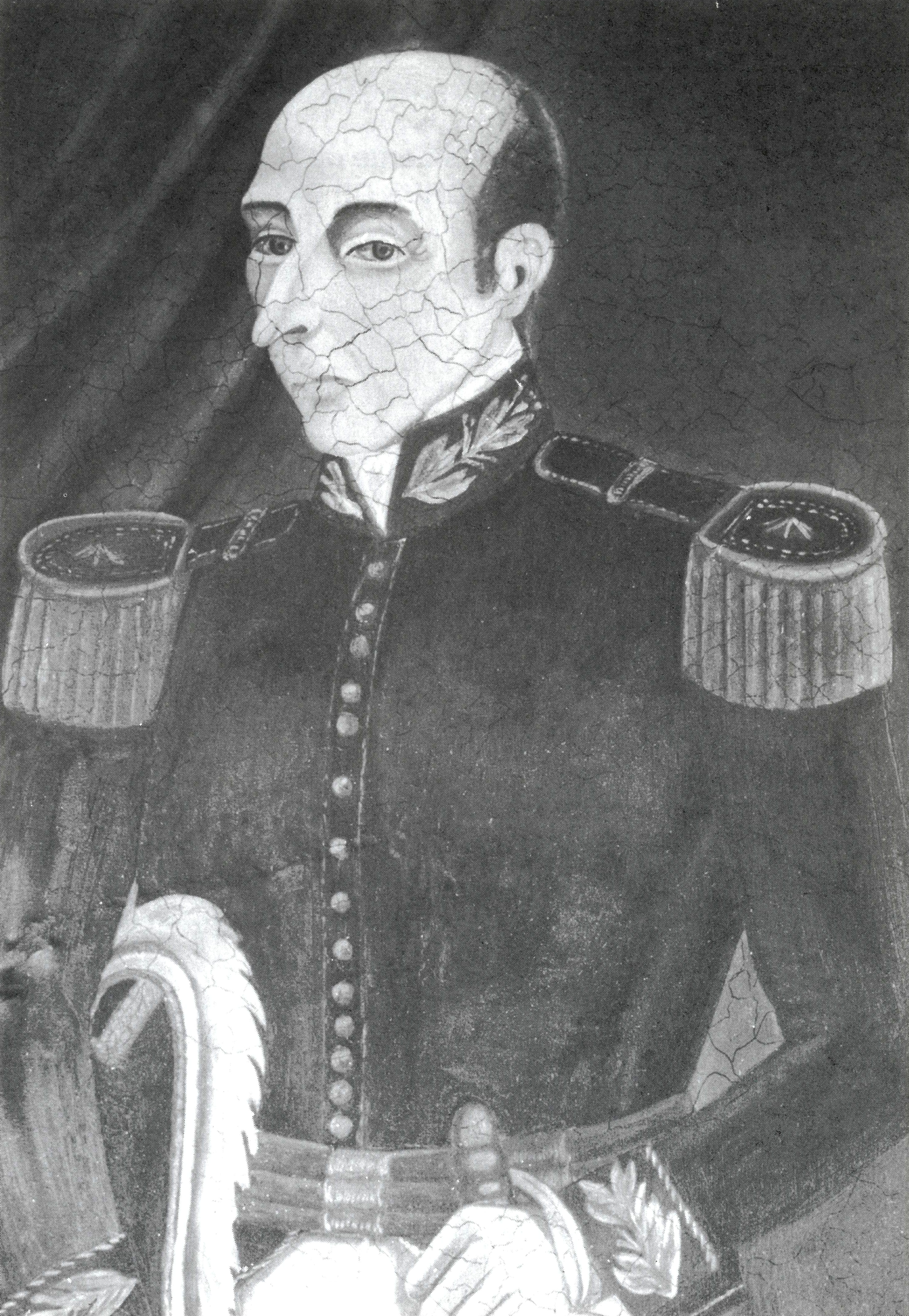
- Portrait of Loayza, Casa de Murillo, La Paz

1st Vice President of Bolivia
- Provisional
- In office 26 December 1828 – 1 January 1829
- President: Pedro Blanco
- Preceded by: Office established
- Succeeded by: José Miguel de Velasco (provisional)

President of Bolivia
- Acting
- In office 18 December 1828 – 26 December 1828
- Preceded by: José Miguel de Velasco (acting)
- Succeeded by: Pedro Blanco

Personal details
- Born: José Ramón de Loayza Pacheco; 26 July 1751 La Paz, Viceroyalty of Peru, Spanish Empire
- Died: 8 November 1839 (aged 88)

José Ramón de Loayza Pacheco (Note: In this Spanish name, the first or paternal surname is Loayza and the second or maternal family name is Pacheco.) (26 July 1751 – 8 November 1839) was a Bolivian military officer and political leader who served as the first vice president of Bolivia from 1828 to 1829. Elected by a Constituent Assembly subservient to Agustín Gamarra, he served under President Pedro Blanco for just six days before being arrested and deposed on 1 January 1829.

== Early life and career ==
José Ramón de Loayza was born on 26 July 1751 in La Paz then a part of the Viceroyalty of Peru. Heir to a great fortune, he was the son of Miguel Loayza and María Gertrudis Pacheco Salgado. In 1781, during the indigenous uprising of Túpac Katari, he was appointed captain of the rifle company, later commander for the defense of the Yungas province fortified in Irupana, resisting the rebels sieging La Paz until their pacification.

Loayza was instrumental in the success of the La Paz revolution, on 16 July 1809 when group of revolutionaries led by Colonel Pedro Domingo Murillo and other individuals besieged the city barracks and forced the governor, Tadeo Davila and the Bishop of La Paz, Remigio de la Santa y Ortega, to resign.

He was appointed mayor of the city of La Paz in 1810. As mayor, he contributed to the construction of the public jail, founded the women's hospital at his own expense, and did the same in the city of Cochabamba before emigrating to Chile. He returned to Bolivia after the Battle of Ayacucho in 1824. He rose to the rank of colonel and was appointed Prefect of the Department of La Paz.

== Vice president (1828–1829) ==
Loayza supported the Peruvian invasion of Bolivia in 1828. When the Peruvian army, under the command of general Agustín Gamarra, occupied the city of La Paz, Loayza, supported by the invaders, deposed the prefect Baltazar Alquiza, dismissing the authorities. Following the resignation of Antonio José de Sucre, the Constituent Assembly elected Marshal Andrés de Santa Cruz president on 12 August 1828. However, Santa Cruz never arrived to take office forcing the assembly to reconvene to elect new leaders.

On 18 December 1828, the assembly elected Pedro Blanco Soto president with José Ramón de Loayza as vice president. For nine days until 26 December, Loayza held the office of the presidency as acting president in the absence of Soto. Loayza and Soto served as instruments of Gamarra's occupation of the country. On 31 December, both were arrested by Bolivian resistance forces and imprisoned in a convent called La Recoletta in Sucre. While Soto was killed attempting to escape, Loayza was eventually forgiven, being released due to his advanced age and low prestige.

== Later years and death ==
During the administration of President Andrés de Santa Cruz, Loayza was rehabilitated in his public life, being appointed deputy for La Paz. He died on 8 November 1839 at the age of 88, at his Maca Maca farm. He bequeathed his fortune to the women's hospital, which he had established years prior.

== Notes ==
Political offices
Preceded by Office established	Vice President of Bolivia; Provisional; 1828–1829	Vacant Title next held by José Miguel de Velasco; Provisional
