= Outline of Ecuador =

Country in South America

The Flag of Ecuador

The Coat of arms of Ecuador

The equator runs through Ecuador

The following outline is provided as an overview of and topical guide to Ecuador:

Ecuador – representative democratic republic in South America, bordered by Colombia on the north, by Peru on the east and south, and by the Pacific Ocean to the west. The country also includes the Galápagos Islands (Archipiélago de Colón) in the Pacific, about 965 kilometers (600 mi) west of the mainland. Ecuador straddles the equator, from which it takes its name, and has an area of 256,371 square kilometers (98,985 sq mi). Its capital city is Quito, and its largest city is Guayaquil.

== General reference ==
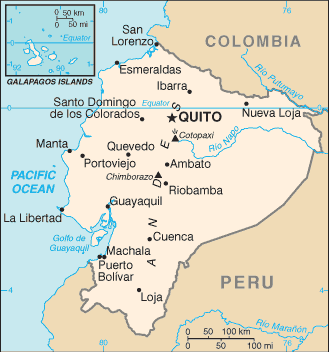
An enlargeable basic map of Ecuador

- Pronunciation: /ˈɛkwədɔːr/
- Common English country name: Ecuador
- Official English country name: The Republic of Ecuador
- Common endonym: Ecuador
- Official endonym: República del Ecuador (literally: Republic of the Equator)
- Adjectival(s): Ecuadorian
- Demonym(s):
- Etymology: Name of Ecuador
- International rankings of Ecuador
- ISO country codes: EC, ECU, 218
- ISO region codes: See ISO 3166-2:EC
- Internet country code top-level domain: .ec

== Geography of Ecuador ==
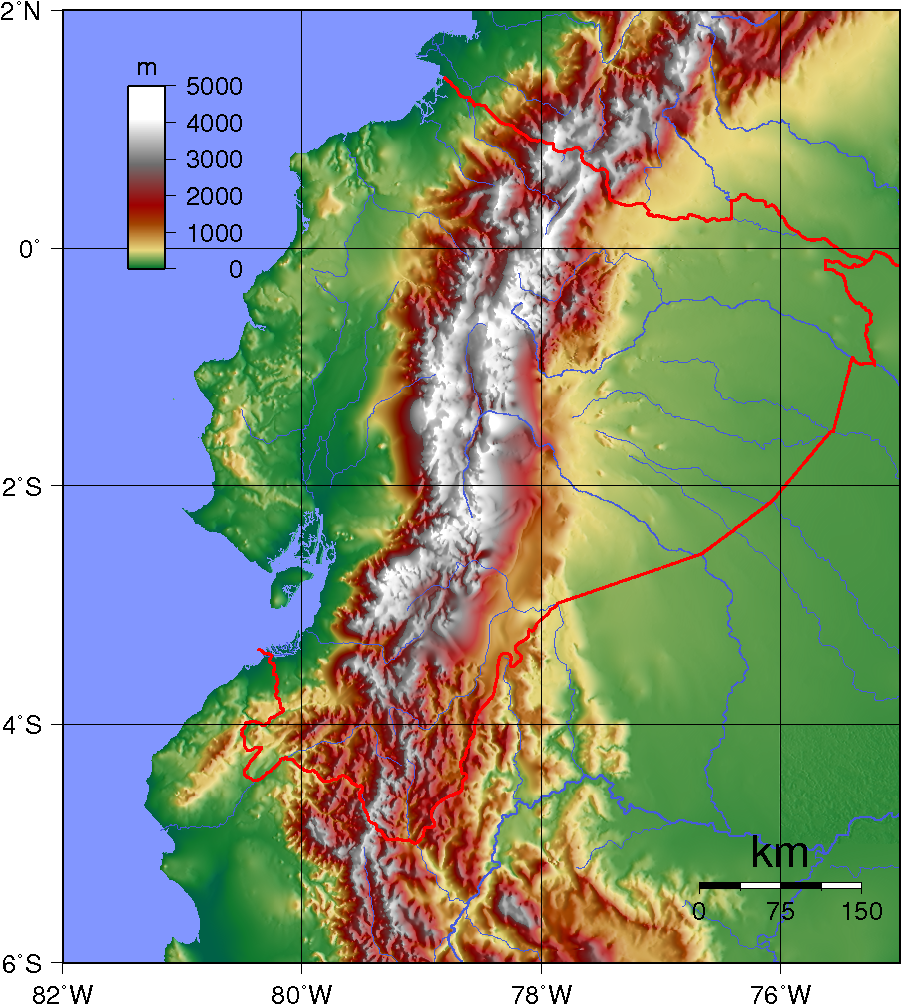
An enlargeable topographic map of continental Ecuador

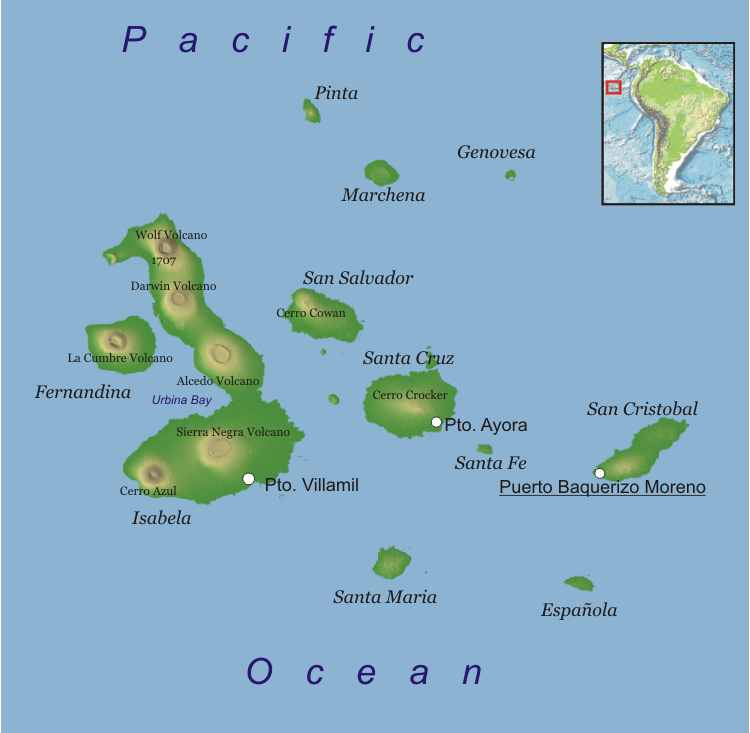
An enlargeable topographic map of the Galápagos Islands of Ecuador

Geography of Ecuador

- Ecuador is: an equatorial megadiverse country
- Location:
  - Western Hemisphere, on the equator
    - South America
  - Time zones:
    - Galápagos Islands – Galápagos Time (UTC-06)
    - Rest of Ecuador – Ecuador Time (UTC-05)
  - Extreme points of Ecuador
    - High: Chimborazo 6,267 m (20,561 ft) – farthest point from the center of the Earth
    - Low: Pacific Ocean 0 m
  - Land boundaries: 2,010 km
  - Peru 1,420 km
  - Colombia 590 km
  - Coastline: Pacific Ocean 2,237 km
- Population of Ecuador: 13,755,680 people (2007 estimate) - 73rd
- Area of Ecuador: 256,370 km^{2} (98,990 sq mi) - 73rd largest country
- Atlas of Ecuador

=== Environment of Ecuador ===
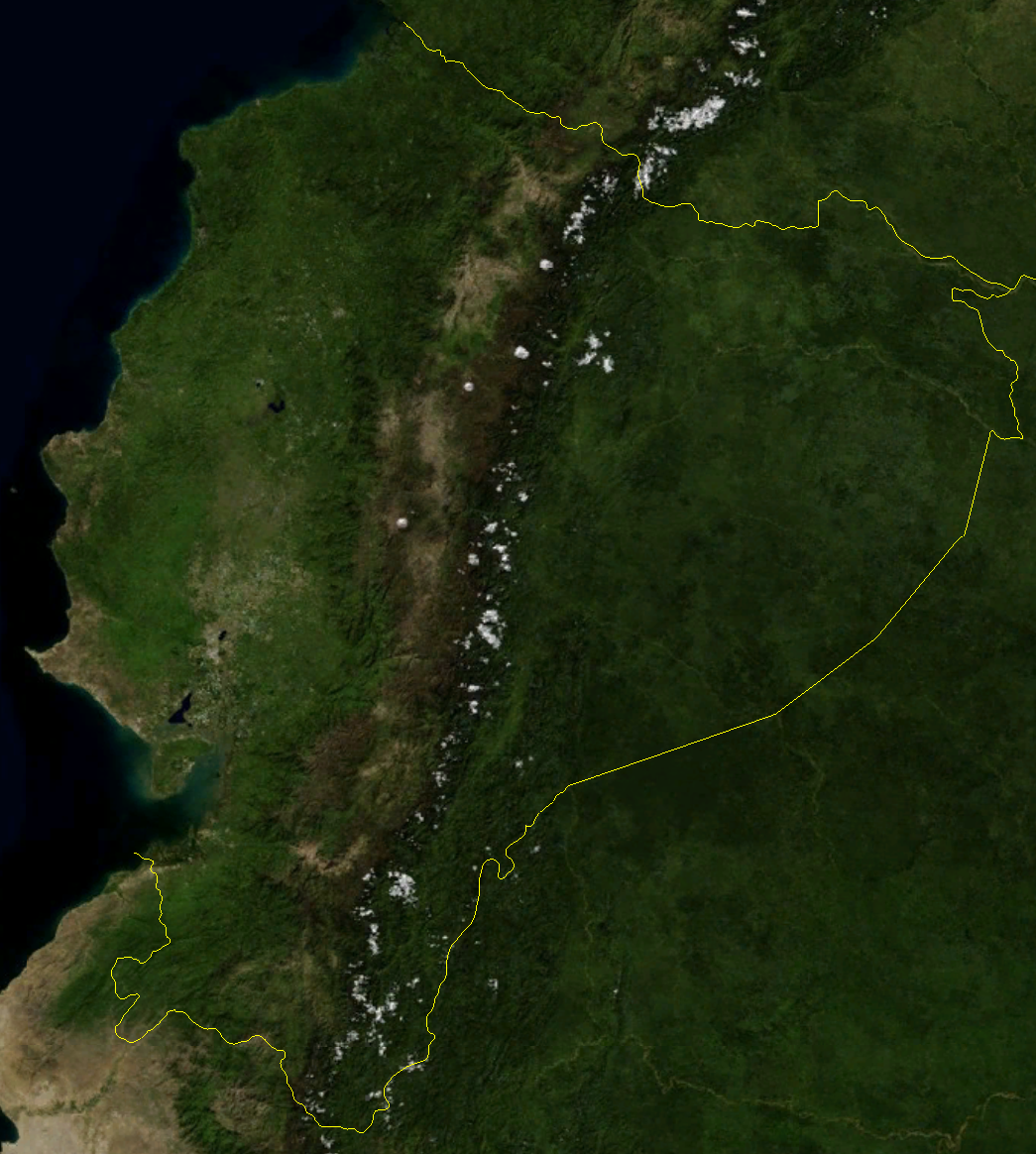
An enlargeable satellite image of continental Ecuador

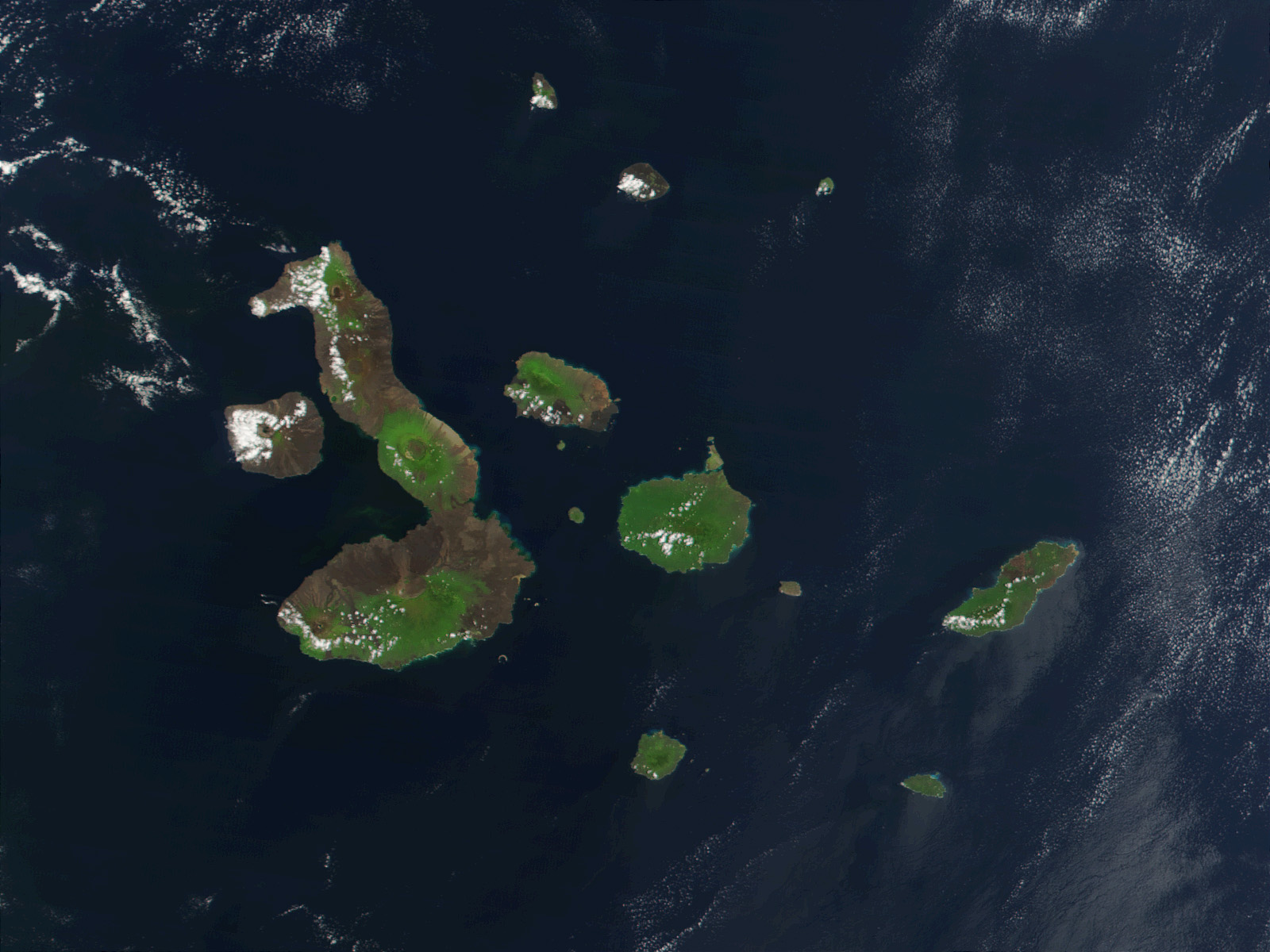
An enlargeable satellite image of the Galápagos Islands of Ecuador

Environment of Ecuador

- Climate of Ecuador
- Earthquakes in Ecuador
- National parks of Ecuador
- Wildlife of Ecuador
  - Fauna of Ecuador
    - Birds of Ecuador
    - Mammals of Ecuador

==== Geographic features of Ecuador ====
- Glaciers of Ecuador
- Islands of Ecuador
- Mountains of Ecuador
  - Volcanoes in Ecuador
- Rivers of Ecuador
- World Heritage Sites in Ecuador

=== Regions of Ecuador ===
Regions of Ecuador

==== Administrative divisions of Ecuador ====
Administrative divisions of Ecuador

- Regions of Ecuador
  - Provinces of Ecuador, see also Province
    - Cantons of Ecuador, see also Canton
      - Parishes of Ecuador, see also Parish

===== Provinces of Ecuador =====
Provinces of Ecuador

- Azuay (1)
- Bolívar (2)
- Cañar (3)
- Carchi (4)
- Chimborazo (5)
- Cotopaxi (6)
- El Oro (7)
- Esmeraldas (8)
- Galápagos (9)
- Guayas (10)
- Imbabura (11)
- Loja (12)

The provinces of Ecuador

- Los Ríos (13)
- Manabí (14)
- Morona Santiago (15)
- Napo (16)
- Orellana (17)
- Pastaza (18)
- Pichincha (19)
- Santa Elena (20)
- Santo Domingo de los Tsáchilas (21)
- Sucumbíos (22)
- Tungurahua (23)
- Zamora-Chinchipe (24)

===== Cantons of Ecuador =====
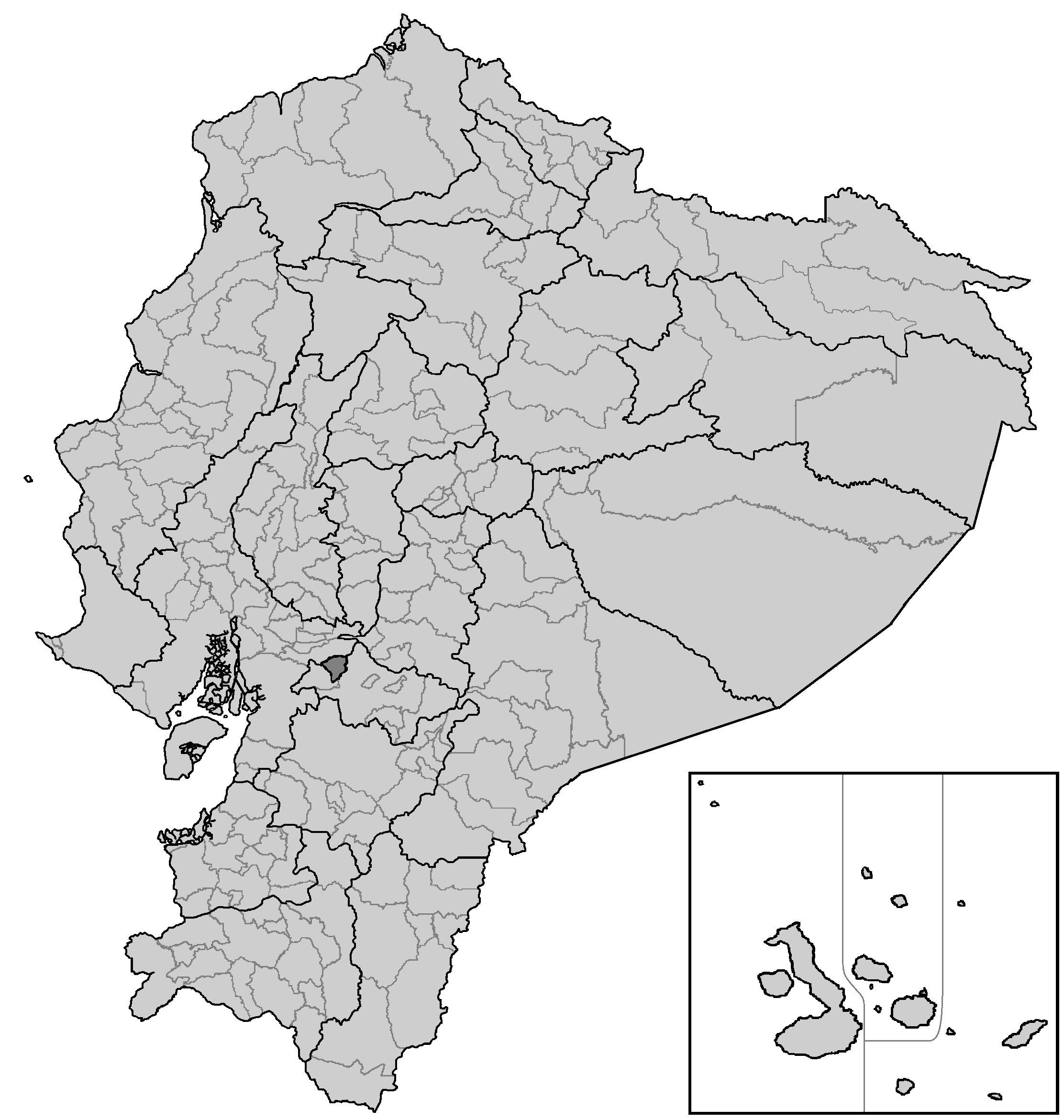
Cantons of Ecuador

Cantons of Ecuador

===== Parishes of Ecuador =====
Parishes of Ecuador

===== Municipalities of Ecuador =====
Municipalities of Ecuador

- Cities of Ecuador
  - Capital of Ecuador: Quito
  - Province capitals of Ecuador

=== Demography of Ecuador ===
Demographics of Ecuador

==== Nations of Ecuador ====
Ecuador is a plurinational state. In addition to whites, blacks, and mestizos, many Ecuadorians belong to indigenous nations, principally:

- Achuar
- Awá
- Chachi
- Cofán
- Huaorani
- Kichua
- Secoya
- Shuar
- Siona
- Tsáchila
- Huancavilca
- Záparo

== Government and politics of Ecuador ==
Government of Ecuador

- Politics of Ecuador
- Form of government: Presidential representative democratic republic
- Capital of Ecuador: Quito
- Elections in Ecuador
- Liberalism and radicalism in Ecuador
- Political parties in Ecuador

=== Branches of the government of Ecuador ===
Government of Ecuador

==== Executive branch of the government of Ecuador ====
- Head of state: President of Ecuador
- Head of government: President of Ecuador
  - Cabinet of Ecuador

==== Legislative branch of the government of Ecuador ====
- National Congress of Ecuador
- Ecuadorian Constituent Assembly

==== Judicial branch of the government of Ecuador ====
Court system of Ecuador

- Supreme Court of Ecuador

=== Foreign relations of Ecuador ===
Foreign relations of Ecuador

==== International organization membership ====
The Republic of Ecuador is a member of:

- Agency for the Prohibition of Nuclear Weapons in Latin America and the Caribbean (OPANAL)
- Andean Community of Nations (CAN)
- Food and Agriculture Organization (FAO)
- Group of 77 (G77)
- Inter-American Development Bank (IADB)
- International Atomic Energy Agency (IAEA)
- International Bank for Reconstruction and Development (IBRD)
- International Chamber of Commerce (ICC)
- International Civil Aviation Organization (ICAO)
- International Criminal Court (ICCt)
- International Criminal Police Organization (Interpol)
- International Development Association (IDA)
- International Federation of Red Cross and Red Crescent Societies (IFRCS)
- International Finance Corporation (IFC)
- International Fund for Agricultural Development (IFAD)
- International Hydrographic Organization (IHO)
- International Labour Organization (ILO)
- International Maritime Organization (IMO)
- International Monetary Fund (IMF)
- International Olympic Committee (IOC)
- International Organization for Migration (IOM)
- International Organization for Standardization (ISO)
- International Red Cross and Red Crescent Movement (ICRM)
- International Telecommunication Union (ITU)
- International Telecommunications Satellite Organization (ITSO)
- International Trade Union Confederation (ITUC)
- Inter-Parliamentary Union (IPU)
- Latin American Economic System (LAES)
- Latin American Integration Association (LAIA)
- Multilateral Investment Guarantee Agency (MIGA)
- Nonaligned Movement (NAM)
- Organisation for the Prohibition of Chemical Weapons (OPCW)
- Organization of American States (OAS)
- Organization of Petroleum Exporting Countries (OPEC)
- Permanent Court of Arbitration (PCA)
- Rio Group (RG)
- Southern Cone Common Market (Mercosur) (associate)
- Unión Latina
- United Nations (UN)
- Union of South American Nations (UNASUR)
- United Nations Conference on Trade and Development (UNCTAD)
- United Nations Educational, Scientific, and Cultural Organization (UNESCO)
- United Nations High Commissioner for Refugees (UNHCR)
- United Nations Industrial Development Organization (UNIDO)
- United Nations Mission in Liberia (UNMIL)
- United Nations Mission in the Central African Republic and Chad (MINURCAT)
- United Nations Mission in the Sudan (UNMIS)
- United Nations Operation in Côte d'Ivoire (UNOCI)
- United Nations Stabilization Mission in Haiti (MINUSTAH)
- Universal Postal Union (UPU)
- World Confederation of Labour (WCL)
- World Customs Organization (WCO)
- World Federation of Trade Unions (WFTU)
- World Health Organization (WHO)
- World Intellectual Property Organization (WIPO)
- World Meteorological Organization (WMO)
- World Tourism Organization (UNWTO)
- World Trade Organization (WTO)

=== Law and order in Ecuador ===
Law of Ecuador

- Capital punishment in Ecuador
- Constitution of Ecuador
- Crime in Ecuador
- Human rights in Ecuador
  - LGBT rights in Ecuador
  - Freedom of religion in Ecuador
- Law enforcement in Ecuador
- Same-sex marriage in Ecuador

=== Military of Ecuador ===
Military of Ecuador

- Command
  - Commander-in-chief:
    - Ministry of Defence of Ecuador
- Forces
  - Army of Ecuador
  - Navy of Ecuador
  - Air Force of Ecuador
- Military history of Ecuador
- Military ranks of Ecuador

== History of Ecuador ==
History of Ecuador

- Timeline of the history of Ecuador
- Current events of Ecuador
- Military history of Ecuador

== Culture of Ecuador ==
Culture of Ecuador

- Cuisine of Ecuador
  - List of Ecuadorian dishes and foods
- Festivals in Ecuador
  - Carnival in Ecuador
- Languages of Ecuador
  - Ecuadorian Spanish
  - Kichwa language
  - Shuar language
- Museums in Ecuador
  - National Museum of Ecuador
- National symbols of Ecuador
  - Coat of arms of Ecuador
  - Flag of Ecuador
  - National anthem of Ecuador
- Prostitution in Ecuador
- Public holidays in Ecuador
- Religion in Ecuador
  - Christianity in Ecuador
  - Islam in Ecuador
  - Judaism in Ecuador
- World Heritage Sites in Ecuador

=== Art in Ecuador ===
- Cinema of Ecuador
- Music of Ecuador
- Television in Ecuador

=== Sports in Ecuador ===
Sports in Ecuador

- Ecuador at the Olympics
- Football in Ecuador

== Science and technology ==
- Ecuadorian Civilian Space Agency (Agencia Espacial Civil Ecuatoriana, EXA)

== Economy and infrastructure of Ecuador ==
Economy of Ecuador

- Economic rank, by nominal GDP (2007): 68th (sixty-eighth)
- .ec Internet country code top-level domain for Ecuador
- Central Bank of Ecuador
- Communications in Ecuador
  - Internet in Ecuador
- Companies of Ecuador
- Currency of Ecuador: Dollar
  - ISO 4217: USD
- Mining in Ecuador
- Tourism in Ecuador
- Transport in Ecuador
  - Airports in Ecuador
  - Highways in Ecuador
  - Rail transport in Ecuador
- Water supply and sanitation in Ecuador

== Education in Ecuador ==
Education in Ecuador

== Health in Ecuador ==
Health in Ecuador

== See also ==
- List of Ecuador-related topics
- List of international rankings
- Member state of the United Nations
- Outline of geography
- Outline of South America
- Wikipedia:WikiProject Library of Congress Country Studies/Ecuador
