= Joint Command of the Armed Forces (Ecuador) =

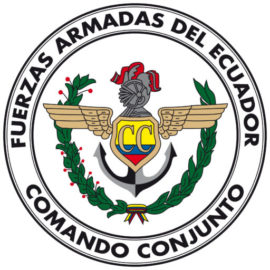
Emblem

The Joint Command of the Armed Forces (Spanish: Comando Conjunto de las Fuerzas Armadas) is responsible for the administration and coordination of the military branches of the Armed Forces of Ecuador.

== History ==
Between 1830 and 1924, the president as commander-in-chief commanded the joint Armed Forces, a function that was delegated on several occasions during armed conflicts. Beginning in 1924, a position of operational administrative authority for the joint Armed Forces was created, undergoing several changes: General Inspectorate of the Army, Superior Command of the Army, Chief of the General Staff and finally, Joint Command since 1971.

== Structure ==
- Joint Command Headquarters of the Armed Forces
  - Operational Staff Headquarters
    - Directorate of Military Mobilization - DIRMOV
    - Control Organs
    - Cyber Defense Command
    - Joint Military Intelligence Command
    - Joint Communications Systems and Electronic Warfare Group
  - Institutional General Staff Headquarters
    - General Secretariat
    - Administrative and Financial Directorate
    - General Directorate of Health of the Armed Forces and Health
    - General Directorate of Education and Military Doctrine
    - Armed Forces Specialty Hospital No. 1
  - General Directorate of Institutional Advice
  - Legal Advisory Office
  - Directorate of Social Communication
  - Directorate of Military Research and Development
  - Directorate of Interinstitutional Cooperation
  - University of the Armed Forces - ESPE
  - Supreme Council of the Armed Forces - COSUPRE
  - Educational Units of the Armed Forces - COLEMIL

== Heads of the Armed Forces ==
| Holder | Period | Branch | Designator |
General Command of the Army (extraordinary position)
| General Juan José Flores y Aramburu | 1835 - 1839 | Ecuadorian Army | Vicente Rocafuerte |
| General Antonio Elizalde Lamar | 1843 - 1843 | Ecuadorian Army | Provisional Government |
| General José María Urbina y Viteri | 1859 - 1859 | Ecuadorian Army | Francisco Robles |
| General José María Sarasti y Ladrón de Guevara | 1883 - 1883 | Ecuadorian Army | Supreme Provisional Government |
| General Leonidas Plaza Gutierrez | 1906 - 1906 | Ecuadorian Army | Lizardo Garcia |
| General Leonidas Plaza Gutierrez | 1912 - 1912 | Ecuadorian Army | Carlos Freile Zaldumbide |
General Inspectorate of the Army
| General Francisco Gómez de la Torre Zaldumbide | 1924 - 1925 | Ecuadorian Army | Gonzalo Cordova |
| Colonel Ricardo Garzón Arregui | 1925 - 1926 | Ecuadorian Army | Provisional Governing Board |
| General Ángel Isaac Chiriboga Navarro | 1926 - 1931 | Ecuadorian Army | Isidro Ayora |
| General Luis Telmo Paz y Miño Estrella | 1931 - 1931 | Ecuadorian Army | Isidro Ayora |
| General Ángel Isaac Chiriboga Navarro | 1931 - 1932 | Ecuadorian Army | Luis Larrea Alba |
| Colonel Carlos A. Guerrero Cruz | 1933 - 1933 | Ecuadorian Army | Juan de Dios Martínez |
| Colonel Aquilino Vásconez Naranjo | 1933 - 1933 | Ecuadorian Army | Juan de Dios Martínez |
| Colonel Alfonso Darquea Cevallos | 1933 - 1933 | Ecuadorian Army | Juan de Dios Martínez |
| General Alcides Pesantes Villacís | 1934 - 1934 | Ecuadorian Army | Abelardo Montalvo |
| Colonel Nicanor Solís Coello | 1934 - 1935 | Ecuadorian Army | José María Velasco Ibarra |
| Colonel Benigno Andrade Flores | 1935 - 1935 | Ecuadorian Army | Antonio Pons |
| Colonel Manuel Cepeda Endara | 1935 - 1935 | Ecuadorian Army | Federico Páez |
| Colonel Enrique Rivadeneira Pazmiño | 1935 - 1937 | Ecuadorian Army | Federico Páez |
| Colonel Aurelio Baquero González | 1937 - 1938 | Ecuadorian Army | Alberto Enríquez Gallo |
| General Enrique Rivadeneira Pazmiño | 1938 - 1939 | Ecuadorian Army | Aurelio Mosquera Narváez |
Army High Command
| Colonel Rafael Villacís Coello | 1939 - 1940 | Ecuadorian Army | Aurelio Mosquera Narváez |
| Colonel Francisco Urrutia Suárez | 1940 - 1941 | Ecuadorian Army | Carlos Arroyo del Río |
| Colonel Alberto Romero Arroyo | 1941 - 1942 | Ecuadorian Army | Carlos Arroyo del Río |
| Colonel Ricardo Astudillo Morillo | 1942 - 1944 | Ecuadorian Army | Carlos Arroyo del Río |
| Colonel Ángel Baquero Dávila | 1944 - 1945 | Ecuadorian Army | José María Velasco Ibarra |
| Colonel Abelardo Aguirre Sánchez | 1945 - 1946 | Ecuadorian Army | José María Velasco Ibarra |
General Staff Headquarters of the Armed Forces
| Lt. Col. José Frechou Stacey | 1946 - 1946 | Ecuadorian Army | José María Velasco Ibarra |
| Colonel Miguel Estrella Arévalo | 1946 - 1947 | Ecuadorian Army | José María Velasco Ibarra |
| General Luis Larrea Alba | 1947 - 1948 | Ecuadorian Army | Carlos Julio Arosemena Tola |
| General César Jaramillo Zumárraga | 1948 - 1949 | Ecuadorian Army | Carlos Julio Arosemena Tola |
| General Carlos Pinto Díaz | 1949 - 1951 | Ecuadorian Army | Galo Plaza |
| Colonel Ángel Baquero Dávila | 1951 - 1952 | Ecuadorian Army | Galo Plaza |
| Colonel César Alfaro Alarcón | 1952 - 1953 | Ecuadorian Army | José María Velasco Ibarra |
| Colonel Carlos Cabrera Sevilla | 1953 - 1953 | Ecuadorian Army | José María Velasco Ibarra |
| Colonel Luis Piñeiros Pastor | 1953 - 1954 | Ecuadorian Army | José María Velasco Ibarra |
| Colonel Manuel María Mejía Erazo | 1954 - 1956 | Ecuadorian Army | José María Velasco Ibarra |
| General of Aviation Bolívar Pico Santos | 1956 - 1958 | Ecuadorian Air Force | José María Velasco Ibarra |
| Calm. Manuel Nieto Cadena | 1958 - 1959 | Ecuadorian Navy | Camilo Ponce |
| General Nestor Gonzalez Zurita | 1959 - 1960 | Ecuadorian Army | Camilo Ponce |
| Colonel Jorge Calle Solano | 1960 - 1961 | Ecuadorian Army | José María Velasco Ibarra |
| Colonel Andrés Arrata Macías | 1961 - 1963 | Ecuadorian Army | Carlos Julio Arosemena Monroy |
| Colonel Federico González Coba | 1963 - 1964 | Ecuadorian Army | Ramón Castro Jijón |
| Def. Telmo Vargas Benalcázar | 1964 - 1966 | Ecuadorian Army | Ramón Castro Jijón |
| Calm. Carlos Monteverde Granados | 1966 - 1967 | Ecuadorian Navy | Clemente Yerovi |
| General Gustavo Banderas Román | 1967 - 1968 | Ecuadorian Army | Otto Arosemena |
| Grad. Leopoldo Mantilla Ante | 1968 - 1968 | Ecuadorian Army | José María Velasco Ibarra |
| Colonel Jorge Navarrete Vasconez | 1968 - 1969 | Ecuadorian Army | José María Velasco Ibarra |
| Calm. Edmundo Mena Salvador | 1969 - 1971 | Ecuadorian Navy | José María Velasco Ibarra |
Joint Command Headquarters of the Armed Forces
| Admiral Jorge Cruz Polanco | 1971 - 1972 | Ecuadorian Navy | José María Velasco Ibarra |
| Brig. Gen. Jorge Izurieta Iturralde | 1972 - 1975 | Ecuadorian Air Force | Guillermo Rodríguez Lara |
| Calm. Sergio Vásquez Pacheco | 1975 - 1975 | Ecuadorian Navy | Guillermo Rodríguez Lara |
| General Ángel Polibio Vega Mora | 1975 - 1976 | Ecuadorian Army | Guillermo Rodríguez Lara |
| Admiral Alfredo Poveda Burbano | 1976 - 1979 | Ecuadorian Navy | Guillermo Rodríguez Lara |
| Admiral Raúl Sorroza Encalada | 1979 - 1981 | Ecuadorian Navy | Jaime Roldós |
| General Medardo Salazar Navas | 1981 - 1983 | Ecuadorian Army | Osvaldo Hurtado |
| Admiral Mario Jaramillo del Castillo | 1983 - 1984 | Ecuadorian Navy | Osvaldo Hurtado |
| Admiral Santiago Coral Terán | 1984 - 1985 | Ecuadorian Navy | Leon Febres Cordero |
| Lieutenant General Frank Vargas Pazzos | 1985 - 1986 | Ecuadorian Air Force | Leon Febres Cordero |
| General Manuel Albuja Albuja | 1986 - 1986 | Ecuadorian Army | Leon Febres Cordero |
| General Jorge Asanza Acaiturri | 1986 - 1988 | Ecuadorian Army | Leon Febres Cordero |
| Admiral Hugo Unda Aguirre | 1988 - 1992 | Ecuadorian Navy | Rodrigo Borja |
| Admiral Héctor Yépez Espinoza | 1992 - 1992 | Ecuadorian Navy | Rodrigo Borja |
| General Alfonso Alarcón Santillán | 1992 - 1994 | Ecuadorian Army | Sixto Durán Ballén |
| General Víctor Manuel Bayas García | 1994 - 1995 | Ecuadorian Army | Sixto Durán Ballén |
| General Jorge Ortega Espinoza | 1995 - 1996 | Ecuadorian Army | Sixto Durán Ballén |
| General Paco Moncayo Gallegos | 1996 - 1998 | Ecuadorian Army | Abdalá Bucaram |
| General César Durán Abad | 1998 - 1998 | Ecuadorian Army | Fabian Alarcon |
| General Patricio Nuñez Sanchez | 1998 - 1998 | Ecuadorian Army | Jamil Mahuad |
| General Carlos Mendoza Poveda | 1998 - 2000 | Ecuadorian Army | Jamil Mahuad |
| General Telmo Sandoval Barona | 2000 - 2000 | Ecuadorian Army | Gustavo Noboa |
| Admiral Miguel Saona Roca | 2000 - 2002 | Ecuadorian Navy | Gustavo Noboa |
| Grab. Oscar Isch Lizarzaburu | 2002 - 2003 | Ecuadorian Army | Gustavo Noboa |
| General Oswaldo Jarrín Román | 2003 - 2003 | Ecuadorian Army | Lucio Gutiérrez |
| Grad. Octavio Romero Ochoa | 2003 - 2004 | Ecuadorian Army | Lucio Gutiérrez |
| Admiral Víctor Hugo Rosero Barba | 2004 - 2005 | Ecuadorian Navy | Lucio Gutiérrez |
| Admiral Manuel Zapater Ramos | 2005 - 2005 | Ecuadorian Navy | Alfredo Palacio |
| General Nelson Enriquez Gomez | 2005 - 2007 | Ecuadorian Army | Alfredo Palacio |
| Lieutenant General Hector Camacho Pauta | 2007 - 2008 | Ecuadorian Air Force | Rafael Correa |
| Grad. Claudio Varela Moncayo | 2008 - 2010 | Ecuadorian Army | Rafael Correa |
| Grad. Luis González Villarreal | 2010 - 2012 | Ecuadorian Army | Rafael Correa |
| Lieutenant General Leonardo Barreiro Muñoz | 2012 - 2014 | Ecuadorian Air Force | Rafael Correa |
| General Luis Garzón Narváez | 2014 - 2016 | Ecuadorian Army | Rafael Correa |
| Admiral Oswaldo Zambrano Cueva | 2016 - 2016 | Ecuadorian Navy | Rafael Correa |
| Lieutenant General César Merizalde Pavón | 2016 - 2018 | Ecuadorian Air Force | Rafael Correa |
| Grad. Roque Moreira Cedeño | 2018 - 2019 | Ecuadorian Army | Lenin Moreno |
| General Luis Lara Jaramillo | 2019 - 2021 | Ecuadorian Army | Lenin Moreno |
| Admiral Jorge Cabrera Espinosa | May 24, 2021 - November 14, 2021 | Ecuadorian Navy | Guillermo Lasso |
| Grad. Fabián Fuel Revelo | November 14, 2021 - May 5, 2022 | Ecuadorian Army | Guillermo Lasso |
| Grab. Nelson Proaño Rodríguez | May 5, 2022 - November 23, 2023 | Ecuadorian Army | Guillermo Lasso |
| Calm. Jaime Patricio Vela Erazo | November 28, 2023 - September 1, 2025 | Ecuadorian Navy | Daniel Noboa |
| Grad. Henry Santiago Delgado Salvador | September 1, 2025–present | Ecuadorian Army | Daniel Noboa |
