= Military ranks of Ecuador =

The Military ranks of Ecuador are the military insignia used by the Armed Forces of Ecuador.

== Commissioned officer ranks ==
The rank insignia of commissioned officers.

Rank group	General / flag officers			Senior officers			Junior officers
Ecuadorian Army
Ecuadorian Army	General de ejército	General de división	General de brigada	Coronel	Teniente coronel	Mayor	Capitán	Teniente	Subteniente
Ecuadorian Navy
Ecuadorian Navy	Almirante	Vicealmirante	Contralmirante	Capitán de navío	Capitán de fragata	Capitán de corbeta	Teniente de navío	Teniente de fragata	Alferez de fragata
Ecuadorian Naval Infantry Corps
Ecuadorian Naval Infantry Corps	Almirante	Vicealmirante	Contralmirante	Capitán de navío	Capitán de fragata	Capitán de corbeta	Teniente de navío	Teniente de fragata	Alferez de fragata
Ecuadorian Air Force
Ecuadorian Air Force	General del aire	Teniente general	Brigadier general	Coronel	Teniente coronel	Mayor	Capitán	Teniente	Subteniente
Rank group	General / flag officers			Senior officers			Junior officers

=== Student officer ranks ===
Rank group	Student officer
Ecuadorian Army
Ecuadorian Navy
Ecuadorian Navy	Guardiamarina 4to año	Guardiamarina 3er año	Guardiamarina 2do año	Guardiamarina 1er año
Ecuadorian Air Force

== Other ranks ==
The rank insignia of non-commissioned officers and enlisted personnel.

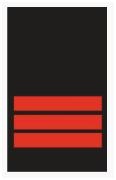
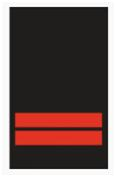
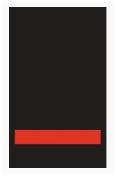
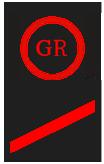
Rank group	Senior NCOs					Junior NCOs		Enlisted
Ecuadorian Army
Ecuadorian Army	Sub-oficial mayor	Sub-oficial primero	Sub-oficial segundo	Sargento primero	Sargento segundo	Cabo primero	Cabo segundo		Soldado
Ecuadorian Navy
Ecuadorian Navy	Sub-oficial mayor	Sub-oficial primero	Sub-oficial segundo	Sargento primero	Sargento segundo	Cabo primero	Cabo segundo	Marinero	Grumete 2do año	Grumete 1er año
Ecuadorian Naval Infantry Corps
Ecuadorian Naval Infantry Corps	Sub-oficial mayor	Sub-oficial primero	Sub-oficial segundo	Sargento primero	Sargento segundo	Cabo primero	Cabo segundo	Marinero	Grumete 2do año	Grumete 1er año
Ecuadorian Air Force
Ecuadorian Air Force	Sub-oficial mayor	Sub-oficial primero	Sub-oficial segundo	Sargento primero	Sargento segundo	Cabo primero	Cabo segundo		Soldado
Rank group	Senior NCOs					Junior NCOs		Enlisted

=== Historic ranks ===
Rank group	Senior NCOs				Junior NCOs		Enlisted
Ecuadorian Army
Ecuadorian Army	Sub-oficial primero	Sub-oficial segundo	Sargento primero	Sargento segundo	Cabo primero	Cabo segundo	Soldado
Rank group	Senior NCOs				Junior NCOs		Enlisted
