= Ministerio de Defensa Nacional =

Ministerio de Defensa Nacional, meaning Ministry of National Defense in Spanish may refer to:

- Ministry of National Defense (Chile)
- Ministry of National Defence (Colombia)
- Ministry of National Defence (Ecuador)
- Ministry of National Defence (Portugal)
