= Telecommunications in Ecuador =

Telecommunications in Ecuador include telephone, radio, television, and the Internet.

Ecuador's state regulatory agency is the National Telecommunications Council (CONATEL), which is part of the Telecommunications Ministry (MINTEL).

== Telephones ==
- Fixed lines: 2.2 million lines, 56th in the world; 15 per 100 persons (2011).
- Mobile cellular: 15.3 million subscribers, 55th in the world; 100 per 100 persons (2011).
- International country code: 593.
- Telephone system:
  - General assessment: elementary fixed-line service, but increasingly sophisticated mobile-cellular network.
  - Domestic: fixed-line services provided by multiple telecommunications operators; mobile-cellular use has surged.
  - International: landing points for the PAN-AM and South America-1 submarine cables that provide links to the west coast of South America, Panama, Colombia, Venezuela, and extending onward to Aruba and the US Virgin Islands in the Caribbean; satellite earth station – 1 Intelsat (Atlantic Ocean) (2011).

There are three cell phone providers in Ecuador: Claro (Telcel), Movistar, and CNT. Mobile networks are diverse and include GSM 850 MHz (largest) as well as CDMA (Bell South's old network before being acquired by Telefónica Spain which rebranded Movistar), TDMA63. CNT is the state owned firm and uses CDMA.

== Radio and television ==
Ecuador has multiple TV networks and many local channels, as well as more than 300 radio stations. Many TV and radio stations are privately owned. The government owns or controls 5 national TV stations and multiple radio stations. Radio and television broadcasters are required by law to give the government free air time to broadcast programs produced by the state (2007).

=== Radio ===
- Radio broadcast stations: AM 279, FM 530 (plus 349 repeaters), shortwave 25 (2006).
- Radios: 5 million (2001).

=== Television ===
- Television broadcast stations: 323 (including repeaters) (2005).
- Televisions: 2.5 million (2001).

== Internet ==
- Internet hosts: 170,538 (2012).
- Internet users: 5.3 million, 56th in the world (2012); 35.1% of the population, 119th in the world.
- Fixed broadband: 825,732 subscribers, 59th in the world; 5.4 of population, 102nd in the world (2012).
- Mobile broadband: 3.4 million subscribers, 48th in the world; 22.2% of population, 67th in the world (2012).
- Internet country code: .ec

The government has an ongoing campaign to increase Internet access across the country, with a goal of extending Internet connectivity to 50 percent of households by 2015. Public Internet access centers, known as Infocentros, have been installed in 377 (48 percent) of Ecuador's 810 rural parishes, with a projection of 100 percent by 2014. Internet cafes are also becoming increasingly common. During the February 2013 elections for president and National Assembly, the Internet provided a real-time forum for candidates to launch proposals, solicit votes, discuss issues, and increase the scope of their publicity campaigns.

Broadband (commonly used in urban zones) and satellite connections (often used in rural areas) are increasingly popular, eclipsing dial-up plans. According to industry estimates, between 33 and 66 percent of Internet users have broadband speeds between 2 and 3 Mbit/s, at a cost of $20 to $25 per month. In May 2012, the Superintendent of Telecommunications indicated that the overall average speed of an Internet connection in Ecuador is 128 kbit/s, although speeds are lower in rural areas.

=== Internet censorship and surveillance ===
- In its Freedom on the Net 2013 report, Freedom House gives Ecuador a "freedom on the net status" of "partly free".

There is no widespread blocking or filtering of websites in Ecuador and access to blogs and social media platforms such as Facebook, Twitter, and YouTube is generally free and open. Diverse sources of national and international information are available via the Internet. Anonymous communication, encrypted communications, and the use of security tools is not prohibited.

There were no government restrictions on access to the Internet or credible reports that the government monitored e-mail or Internet chat rooms. However, on 11 July 2012 the government passed a new telecommunications regulation, requiring that Internet service providers fulfill all information requests from the superintendent of telecommunications, allowing access to client addresses and information without a judicial order.

Standard defamation laws apply to content posted online. Attempts to censor statements made in times of heightened political sensitivity have been reported, as have alleged instances of censorship via the overly broad application of copyright to content critical of the government. Lawsuits have been filed against digital news sites for comments critical of the government. To use the services provided by cybercafes, the national secretary of telecommunications, SENATEL, requires that users register with the following information: full name, phone number, passport number, voting certificate number, email address, and home address.

Self-censorship of comments critical of the government is encouraged. In January 2013, for example, President Correa called for the National Secretary of Intelligence (SENAIN) to investigate two Twitter users who had published disparaging comments about him, an announcement which sent a warning to others not to post comments critical of the president. After receiving criticism from the government, news site La Hora indefinitely suspended the reader comments section on its website. At the president's request, the comments section was shut down completely. Print and digital news outlet El Comercio faced similar pressure related to its readers' comments and the comments section was ultimately disabled after President Correa sent a letter of complaint. While there are no official constraints on organizing protests over the Internet, warnings from the president stating that the act of protesting will be interpreted as "an attempt to destabilize the government" have undoubtedly discouraged some from organizing and participating in protests.

Ecuador's new "Organic Law on Communications" was passed in June 2013. The law recognizes a right to communication. Media companies are required to collect and store user information. "Media lynching", which appears to extend to any accusation of corruption or investigation of a public official—even those that are supported with evidence, is prohibited. Websites bear "ultimate responsibility" for all content they host, including content authored by third parties. The law creates a new media regulator to prohibit the dissemination of "unbalanced" information and bans non-degreed journalists from publishing, effectively outlawing much investigative reporting and citizen journalism. Human rights organizations fear that the new law will stifle critical voices in the media, due to its vague wording, arbitrary sanctions, and the threat of civil and criminal penalties.

== See also ==
- ETAPA
- HCJB, "The Voice of the Andes" radio station
