= .ec =

Internet country code top-level domain for Ecuador

- Introduced: 1 February 1991
- TLD type: Country code top-level domain
- Status: Active
- Registry: EcuaNet
- Sponsor: NICEC
- Intended use: Entities connected with Ecuador
- Actual use: Popular in Ecuador
- Registered domains: 49,340 (2022-12-15)
- Registration restrictions: Some third-level registrations have restrictions depending on second-level name they are within
- Structure: Registrations are made directly at the second level, or at third level beneath some second-level labels
- Documents: Policies
- Dispute policies: UDRP
- DNSSEC: Yes
- Registry website: nic.ec

.ec is the country code top-level domain (ccTLD) for Ecuador.

== Domains and Subdomains ==
Registrations are made directly at the second level or at the third level beneath these names:

Domain	Intended users
.ec	General use
.com.ec	Commercial use
.info.ec	General information
.net.ec	Providers of Internet services
.fin.ec	Financial institutions and services
.med.ec	Medical and health-related entities
.pro.ec	Professionals such as lawyers, architects, accountants, etc.
.org.ec	Non-profit organizations and entities
.edu.ec	Educational entities
.gob.ec	Government of Ecuador, since July 2010
.gov.ec	Formerly used by the Government
.mil.ec	Ecuadorian military

== Notable incidents involving .ec domains ==
In November 2016, one of the mirror domains of Archive.is, "archive.ec", did not work for a period of 8 consecutive days due to a software bug in the .ec registry.

== See also ==
- Internet in Ecuador
