= Tiuna =

Tiuna UR-53AR50
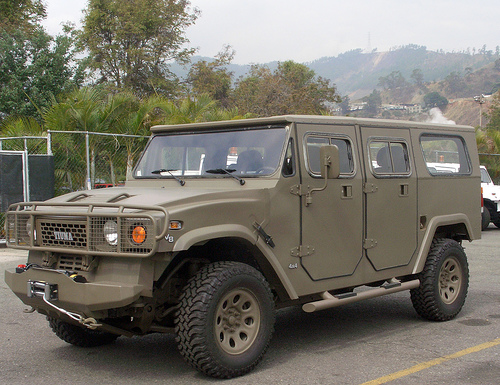
- A Tiuna with a covered cab roof.
- Type: Light Utility Vehicle
- Place of origin: Venezuela

Service history
- In service: 2004 - present

Production history
- Manufacturer: CENARECA
- Unit cost: $69,767.44 (USD) / BsF. 142.857,00 (VEF) (basic unit)
- Produced: July 20, 2004 – present

Specifications
- Mass: 2 tons
- Length: 4.92 meters
- Crew: 9 (Including driver)
- Engine: General Motors Vortec V8 5.3 litre
- Transmission: 5-speed
- Suspension: wheeled

The Tiuna UR-53AR50 is a Venezuelan multipurpose military vehicle, presented by CENARECA and assembled locally by Venezolana de Vehículos para la Defensa. The assembly plant is located at Fort Tiuna, Caracas, Distrito Capital, Venezuela.

The Tiuna design was created by CAVIM to compete with the American-made Humvee, and was first shown to the public on July 20, 2004.

Production vehicles are built with the support of companies that bring vehicle parts for their construction and co-ops that work at the Fort Tiuna Assembly Plant (VVD Headquarters). This vehicle is designed and built in Venezuela.

== Models ==
The following are known production models for the Tiuna:

- Military
  - Reconnaissance
  - Anti-Tank
  - Command Post
  - Air Defense
    - MANPAD-mounted
    - As towing vehicle for AAA guns
  - Communications
  - Anti-Riot
  - Recoilless rifle-mounted (M40)
  - Multiple rocket launcher
- Others
  - Transportation (Personal)
  - Cargo (Dry)
  - Ambulance
  - Maintenance
  - Fuel
  - Water tanker
- Civilian
  - SUV

== Operators ==
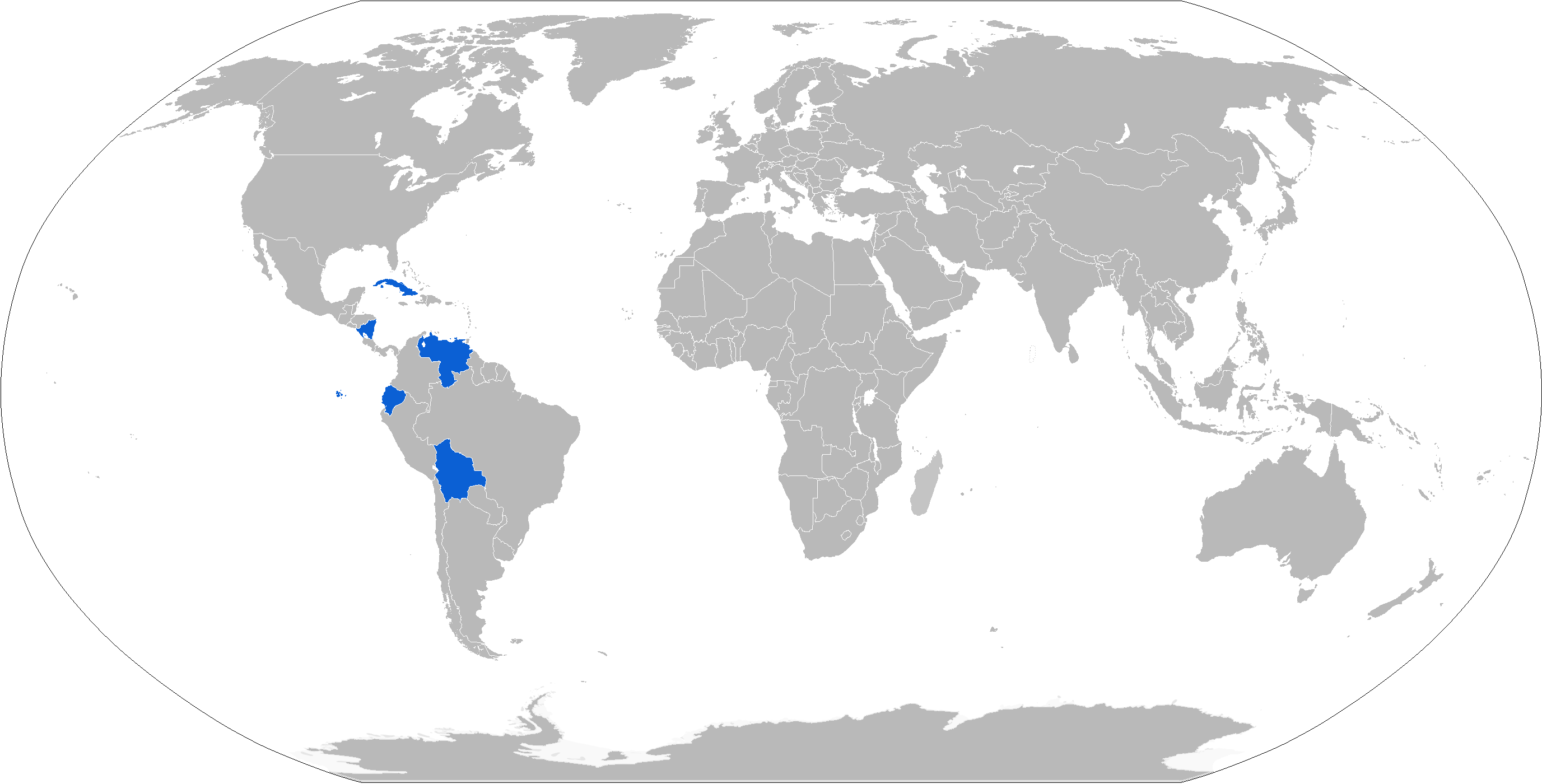
Map of Tiuna operators in blue

- Bolivia
- Cuba
- Ecuador
- Venezuela: Used by Venezuelan military since 2004.
