= Freedom of religion in Ecuador =

Freedom of religion in Ecuador is guaranteed by the country's constitution.

== Religious demography ==
The country has an area of 283,561 square kilometres and a population of approximately 17 million in 2022.

A Latinobarometer 2018 public opinion survey showed that 74.8% of the population identified as Catholic, 15.2% as evangelical Christian, 6.1% were agnostic, 1.2% were Jehovah’s Witnesses and 0.8% were atheists. Other religious groups included Seventh-day Adventists, The Church of Jesus Christ of Latter-day Saints (Church of Jesus Christ), Jews, Anglicans, Baha’is, Episcopalians, the Family Federation for World Peace and Unification (Unification Church), Greek Orthodox-affiliated Orthodox Church of Ecuador and Latin America, Hindus, followers of Inti (the traditional Inca sun god), and practitioners of Santeria (primarily resident Cubans).

The Evangelical Missionary Union estimated that there were one million Protestants in the country in 2007.

== Status of religious freedom ==
The Constitution provides for freedom of religion, and prohibits discrimination based on religion.

The Government requires religious groups to register with the government; benefits include tax exemptions and access to government funding, while failure to do so can result in the group’s dissolution and liquidation of its physical property.

The Government permits missionary activity and public religious expression by all religious groups.

The Government does not generally permit religious instruction in public schools. Private schools have complete liberty to provide religious instruction, as do parents in the home.

In the early 2000s, Catholics reportedly complained that the Government restricted access to the Galápagos Islands for ecological reasons to the extent that foreign missionaries had difficulty ministering to the 14,500 resident Catholics.

On August 27, 2006, two military officers (Ivan Santi Mucushigua and Cervantes Santamaria Cuji) and a civilian (Lucio Cirilo Dahua) allegedly killed Balti Cadena, a traditional healer (yachak), and injured one of his sons, near the Amazonas Military Fort in Puyo, Pastaza Province. The Public Prosecutor, in a civilian court, charged the two military officers with murder. At the end of the reporting period, the officers were held at the Amazonas Military Fort and had appealed to the Superior Court of Puyo. Press reports added that at least four traditional healers have been killed in the past 10 years in the same area.

In 2023, the country was scored 4 out of 4 for religious freedom.
