= International rankings of Ecuador =

These are the international rankings of Ecuador.

== Demographics ==
- Immigrant population in Ecuador ranked 119.

== Technology ==
- In innovation and technology, Ecuador ranks 96th.
- World Intellectual Property Organization: Global Innovation Index 2026, ranked 106 out of 139 countries

== Economy ==
- Foreign exchange reserves: not in top 80 worldwide. The government's deposits are “extremely low.”
- International Monetary Fund: 2009 List of countries by GDP (nominal) per capita ranked 88
- International Monetary Fund: 2009 List of countries by GDP (nominal) ranked 65
- Ecuador ranks 71st in Global Competitiveness

== Environment ==
- 2012 Happy Planet Index ranked 23
- Yale University and Columbia University: 2010 Environmental Performance Index ranked 30

== Globalization ==
- 2007 KOF Index of Globalization ranked 63

== Military ==
- Institute for Economics and Peace/Economist Intelligence Unit: Global Peace Index 2009, ranked 109

== Politics ==
- Economist Intelligence Unit: Democracy Index 2008, ranked 88
- The Heritage Foundation and The Wall Street Journal: 2010 Index of Economic Freedom ranked 147
- Reporters Without Borders Press Freedom Index 2013, ranked 119
- Transparency International Corruption Perceptions Index 2009, ranked 146 out of 180 countries

== Society ==
- Economist Intelligence Unit: Quality-of-life index 2005, ranked 52
- Homicide rate ranked 12 most homicides per capita in the world

== Other ==
- Institute for Economics and Peace/Economist Intelligence Unit: Global Peace Index 2009, ranked 109
- Transparency International Corruption Perceptions Index 2009, ranked 146 out of 180 countries
