= Armed Forces of Ecuador =

Military forces of the Republic of Ecuador

Ecuadorian Armed Forces
- Fuerzas Armadas del Ecuador
- Founded: 1830
- Current form: 2000
- Service branches: Ecuadorian Army; Ecuadorian Air Force; Ecuadorian Navy
- Headquarters: Ministry of National Defence, Quito

Leadership
- President: Daniel Noboa
- Minister of National Defence: Giancarlo Loffredo Rendón
- Chief of the Armed Forces: General Henry Santiago Delgado Salvador

Personnel
- Military age: 18
- Conscription: Suspended
- Active personnel: 41,250
- Reserve personnel: 118,000

Expenditure
- Budget: US$2.3 billion (FY11)
- Percent of GDP: 2.74% (FY10)

Industry
- Foreign suppliers: Turkey; United States; Ukraine; France; Germany; Canada; United Kingdom; Israel; Spain; South Africa; Republic of Korea; Russia; Japan; Switzerland; China; Serbia; Brazil; Belarus; European Union

Related articles
- History: Military history of Ecuador
- Ranks: Rank insignia

The Ecuadorian Armed Forces (Spanish: Fuerzas Armadas del Ecuador) is the national military force of Ecuador. The commander-in-chief is the president of Ecuador. The military is generally under civilian control, specifically the Ministry of National Defence. The military of Ecuador has been involved in border disputes with Peru (Ecuadorian–Peruvian War (1857–1860), Ecuadorian–Peruvian War, Paquisha War, Cenepa War), and has provided military observers and troops to the United Nations since 1948.

Since 2024, the Ecuadorian Armed Forces have been involved in the war on organized crime, carrying out control activities in prisons and on highways, as well as missions to confront groups declared as terrorists in Ecuador.

== Mission ==
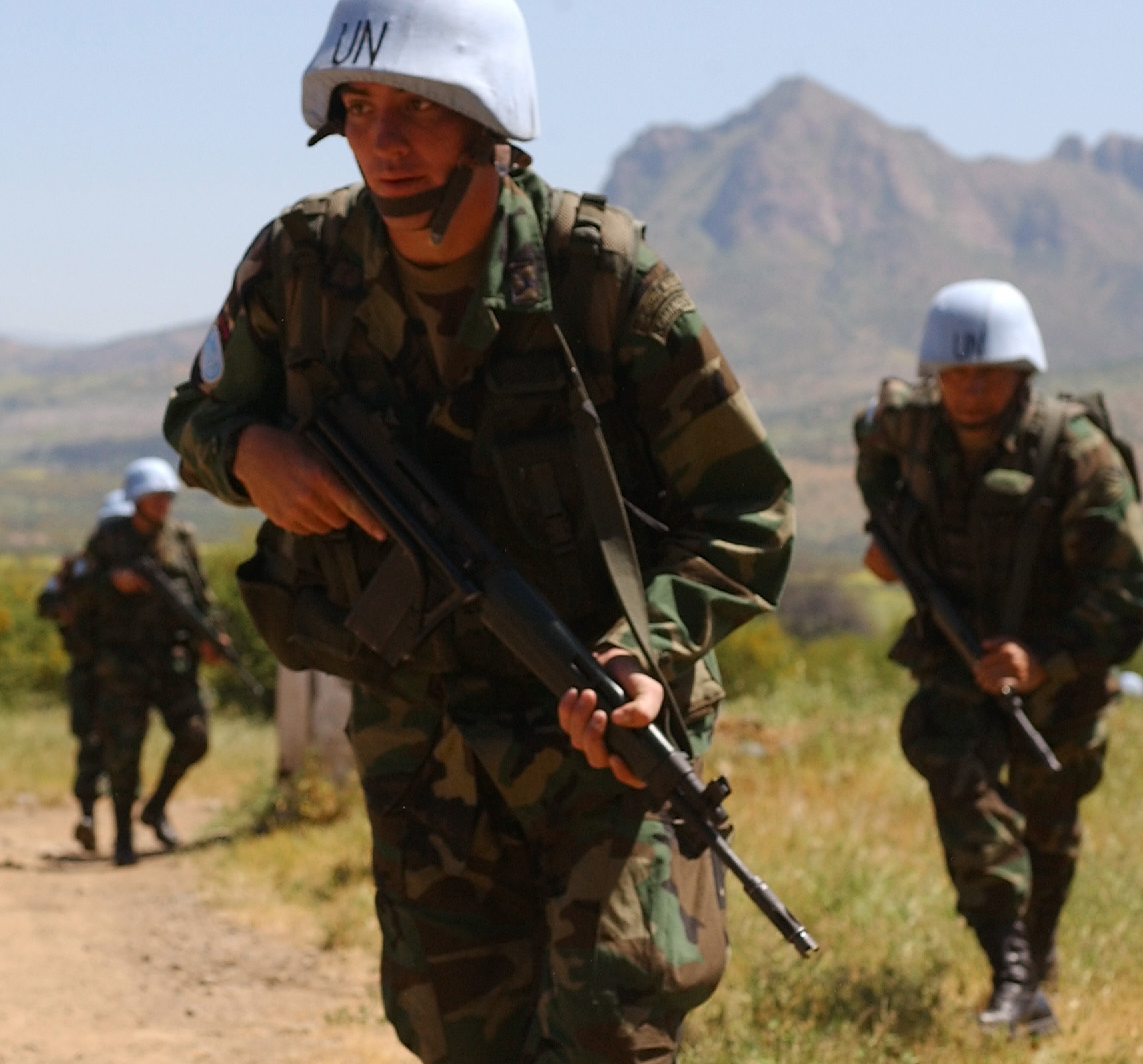
Ecuadorian Army soldier participates at a UN exercise

The armed forces are part of the public forces and have the stated mission of the preservation of the integrity and national sovereignty of the national territory. It also involves participation in the social and economic development of the country and the provision of assistance in the maintenance of internal order. Tasks include fighting organised crime, anti-narcotic operations and illegal immigration. One social development programme applies the provision of teachers for rural schools through an accord with the Ministry of Education. Environmental protection is also a priority, several programmes were implemented: National Forestation and Ornamentation, Lonely Tree, Green Surveillance, Fire Plan, Ecuador Forest, and Arenillas Military Reserve. The Ecuadorian territory is divided into five Joint Task Force Zones or Fuerzas de Tarea Conjunta, four on mainland Ecuador, the fifth being the Naval Zone (including the Galápagos Islands). Overseas territories include also the Pedro Vicente Maldonado Naval Biological Research Station in the Antarctic.

== Geopolitical situation ==
Ecuador shares a 1,420 km (882 mi) border with Peru. Although marked by many conflicts, relations have improved since the signing of a renewed Peace Treaty in 1998. However, along the 590 km (367 mi)-long border with its neighbour Colombia, relations have been strained mainly due to a cross-border raid by Colombian forces on FARC guerrillas. The Armed Forces had logistical shortcomings and were caught off-guard. Their radar did not work, aviation was virtually non-existent, and communications were not fully operational. A diplomatic crisis followed in 2008 which some attribute partially to the need for better equipment as well as a new national defence doctrine.

The new administration at the Defence Ministry launched a deep restructuring program under the name of PATRIA I. It involves the modernisation of military equipment, improvement of planning, and operations within the Ecuadorian territory. PATRIA I was planned to be completed by 2011. In 2009, the spending budget was increased by 25% and totaled $920 million.

== History ==
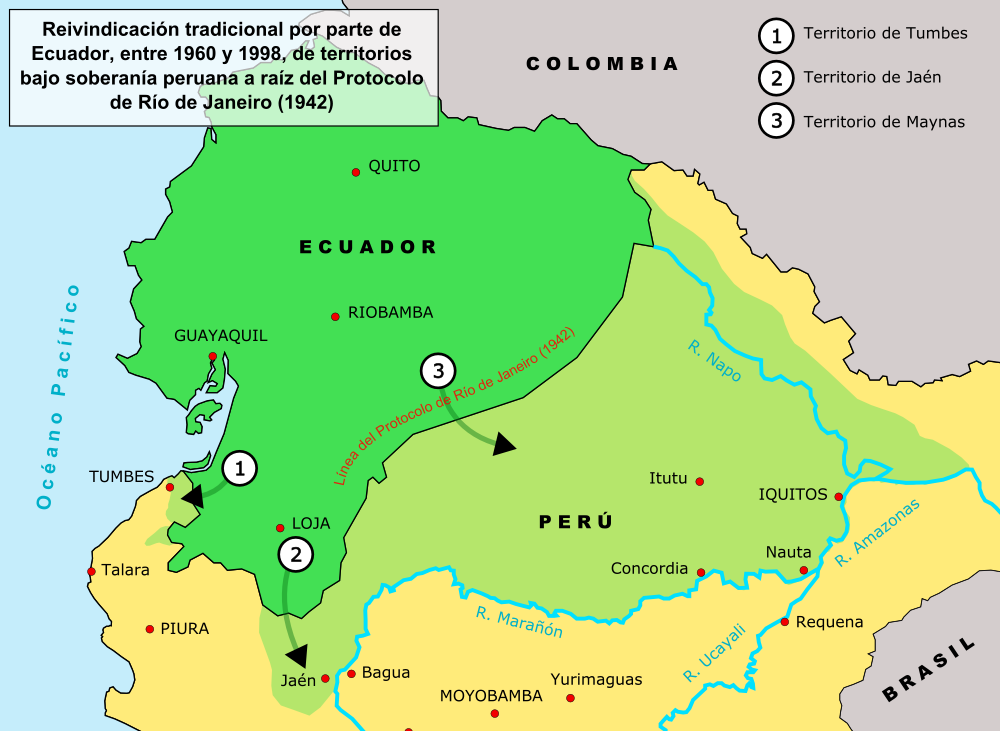
Map of the long-lasting territorial dispute between Ecuador and Peru, settled only in 1998. (in Spanish)

Ecuador's military history dates far back to its first attempt to secure freedom from Spain in 1811. In 1822 Ecuadorian troops, alongside other rebel forces, scored a decisive victory over the Spanish royalist army at the Battle of Pichincha. Although assisted by Peruvian troops, it would fight these only a few years later in 1828, as a member of the Confederation of Gran Colombia. The troops of Gran Colombia (Less than half of its troops were Ecuadorians), is defeated in the Battle of Punta Malpelo and the combat of crosses, where the Peruvian navy blocks Guayaquil. Then the great Colombians in the land field defeat a division of Peruvian outpost, in the battle of Tarqui. This battle does not define war after the signing of the Giron agreement, where it is indicated that it remains in a status quo before bellum. Eventually, Civil War would plunge the country and the army into disorder. In 1941 the Ecuadorian Military found itself weak and disorganized; the by now long-lasting territorial dispute with Peru escalated into a major conflict, the Ecuadorian–Peruvian War of 1941. A much larger and better equipped Peruvian force quickly overwhelmed the Ecuadorian forces, driving them back and invading the Ecuadorian territory. Ecuador had no choice but to accept Peru's territorial claims and signed a Peace treaty in 1942. However, the treaty of 1942 failed to settle the border dispute, and occasional clashes occurred in a then still non-demarcated border area between the nations. These clashes flared into another outbreak of serious fighting in January 1981 called the Paquisha War where Ecuadorian troops infiltrated into Peruvian territory are expelled by the Peruvian army; similar incidents occurred in 1983 and again in 1984. The last military conflict with Peru occurred in 1995, during the Cenepa War, in which both sides claimed to be fighting inside their own territory until the signing of a ceasefire and the eventual separation of forces. The longest-running source of armed international conflict in the Western Hemisphere had ended.

=== Local engagements ===
- Ecuadorian War of Independence in 1820
- Battle of Pichincha in 1822
- Gran Colombia–Peru War in 1829
- Ecuadorian–Peruvian War (1857–1860)
- Battle of Guayaquil in 1860
- Ecuadorian-Colombian War in 1863
- Chincha Islands War in 1864
- Ecuadorian–Peruvian War in 1941
- Paquisha War in 1981
- Cenepa War in 1995
- 2024 conflict in Ecuador in 2024

=== UN peacekeeping operations ===
The Ecuadorian Armed Forces has provided military observers and troops to the United Nations since 1948. In November 2003, an Ecuadorian United Nations Training Centre was established under the name of: (La Unidad Escuela de Misiones de Paz "Ecuador"). In 2009, Ecuador was deploying over 90 peacekeepers around the globe.

- 1948 UNIMOGIP United Nations Military Observer Group in Pakistan.
- 1948 UNIMOGIP United Nations Military Observer Group in India.
- 1958 UNOGIL Peacekeeping mission in Lebanon.
- 1961 (Democratic Republic of the Congo) ONUC Peacekeeping Force in Congo.
- 1965 DOMREP Mission of the Representative of the Secretary-General in the Dominican Republic.
- 1990 ONUCA United Nations Observer Group in Central America, Nicaragua.
- 1991 ONUSAL United Nations Observer Group in El Salvador.
- 1994 MINUGUA United Nations Verification Mission in Guatemala.
- 2003 UNMIL United Nations Observer Group in Liberia.
- 2004 UNOCI Peacekeeping mission in Ivory Coast.
- 2004 MINUSTAH, United Nations Stabilization Mission in Haiti.
- 2005 UNMIS United Nations Mission in Sudan.
- 2007 UNMIN United Nations Mission in Nepal.
- 2008 MINURCAT United Nations Mission in Chad.
- 2008 MINURCAT Part of a Peacebuilding Commission in the Central African Republic.
- 2010 (Sudan) UNAMID United Nations Mission and the African Union in Darfur.

== Organization ==
The armed forces of Ecuador are under the authority of the President of the Republic through the Ministry of Defence, coordinated by the Joint Command of the Armed Forces.

== Command structure ==
- The Commander-in-Chief of the Armed Forces (Comandante en Jefe de las Fuerzas Armadas) is the President of the Republic. He exercises the political leadership of security and national defence and counts on the advice of the National Security Council.
- The National Security Council (El Consejo de Seguridad Nacional) or N.S.C. is the superior body responsible for the national defence, in charge of issuing the strategic concept of national security, which in turn constitutes the essential instrument to start the planning and decision-making process. It is chaired by the President of the Republic, which is also the Commander-in-Chief of the Armed Forces. It includes the Presidents of the National Congress and the Supreme Court of Justice; the ministers in charge of National Defence, Government and Police, Foreign Affairs, and Economy and Finance; the Chief of the Joint Command, and the Chiefs of the three branches of the Armed Forces. It monitors the fulfillment of the defence policies and the strategic plans elaborated by the Joint Command of the Armed Forces, submitted by the Ministry of National Defence. The N.S.C. constitutes the highest ranking monitoring and crisis management body.
- The Ministry of Defense (Ministerio de la Defensa National), is the administrative body of the national defence. The Coordinating Minister of Internal and External Security accords the policies and actions that will be adopted by the following institutions as regards internal and external security: the Ministry of Government and Police, the Ministry of Foreign Affairs, the Ministry of Defence, and the Secretariat General for the Public administration.
- The Joint Armed Forces Command (El Comando Conjunto de las Fuerzas Armadas), is the highest planning, preparation and strategic body of military operations. It advises on national defence and is conformed by the Chief of the Joint Command of the Armed Forces and the Commanders of all three branches of the Ecuadorian Armed Forces: The Army, Navy and the Air Force.

== Branches ==
=== Joint Command ===
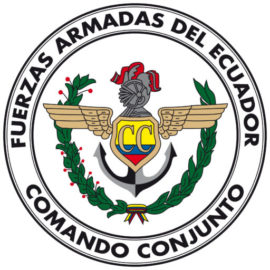

The command is in charge of the administration and coordination of the three military branches. The objectives of the command are to integrate the military branches with joint capabilities and interoperability, to address changes and new scenarios, which guarantee the peace, security, and well-being of the nation.

Through military strategic guidelines and guidelines, in the innovation, updating, development and implementation of the generation of military technology, through strategic study in the development of military capabilities, verification of the optimal installed military capacity, implementation of military technological development, in order to promote military operational growth to be the effective and efficient decisive force.

=== Army ===

The Ecuadorian Army (Ejército Ecuatoriano) is the land component of the Armed Forces. Its 25,650 soldiers are deployed in relation to its military doctrine. The contemporary Ecuadorian Army has a large component of jungle and special forces infantry units implemented within its structure. It operates around 236 tanks, 780 IFVs and 68 aircraft; their standard rifle is the Heckler & Koch HK33. Recently acquired material include:

- (Brazil) 30 4x4 vehicles
- (Japan) 15 Hino trucks (donated by the USA)
- 2 4x4 vehicles (donated by Venezuela)
- (Russia) 2 Mil Mi-17 helicopters
- (United States) 107 Humvee

=== Air Force ===
Seal of the Ecuadorian Air Force

The present day Ecuadorian Air Force (Fuerza Aérea Ecuatoriana) saw combat action several times in 1981 and 1995 when it gained valuable experiences against the Peruvian Air Force. The FAE has a personnel strength of 6,200 and focuses mainly on border control but also focuses on the war on drugs, guerrilla insurgencies, and humanitarian missions. Since 2009 the FAE has been undergoing major changes and modernisation plans are ongoing whilst new projects are considered to bolster the country's defence capacities. Recent and ongoing orders include:

- (Brazil) 18 Super Tucano light combat aircraft
- 6 Mirage 5 (donated by Venezuela)
- (South Africa) 12 Cheetah supersonic fighter aircraft
- 8 HAL Dhruv helicopters from India
- (Spain) 3D LANZA Radar low altitude radars
- (Spain) 3 EADS CASA C-295 Tactical military transport aircraft.

=== Navy ===
Ecuadorian Navy insignia

The present-day Ecuadorian Navy or (Armada del Ecuador) is a compact, efficient, and well-balanced force. However, limited funds hinder any major acquisitions and the chances of maintaining a strong force within the Pacific Ocean. Since the end of 2009, the Navy's structure became simplified. The Ecuadorian Naval Zone became one and measures, 2,237 km (1,390 mi) of the Pacific Coast and 6,720 km^{2} (2,590 sq mi) of the Pacific Ocean, (including the Galápagos Islands). Most sea-going assets are based at Guayaquil. The Navy focuses mainly on border control and illegal immigration. The Navy operates around 20 major vessels (including two submarines) and 25 aircraft. It has a personnel strength of 9,400. To increase its operational capabilities it recently acquired:

- (Israel) 2 Heron 1 unmanned aerial vehicles
- (Israel) 4 Searcher MK II unmanned aerial vehicles

=== Cyber-Defense Operations Command ===
It is a body responsible for the planning and execution of actions related to cyberdefense in networks and information and telecommunications systems or others that it may have entrusted to, as well as contributing to the appropriate response in cyberspace to threats or aggressions that may affect National Defense, guaranteeing and providing security to strategic entities that are managed by computer systems.

He is prepared to counter cyberattacks, cyberwarfare and espionage to "critical entities" that could be attacked "from anywhere in the world."

== Education ==
The training of army, navy and air force officers is the function of the Eloy Alfaro Military Higher School, the Rafael Morán Valverde Naval Higher School and the Cosme Rennella Barbatto Military Higher School, respectively.

== Equipment sources ==
Historically, Ecuador depended on a wide variety of foreign suppliers for virtually all of its equipment needs. Only in the 1980s did it begin to develop a modest domestic arms industry as the Directorate of Army Industries manufactured rifle ammunition, uniforms, boots, and other items.

In the 1960s and 1970s, France became a leading supplier and delivered AMX-13 tanks and various aircraft. Ecuador also purchased Type 209 submarines and Lürssen-Seawolf TNC 45 patrol boats from West Germany. Various types of infantry weapons were acquired from Belgium.

Ecuador became a substantial customer for Israeli arms in the 1970s, purchasing Arava aircraft, Gabriel missiles for naval patrol craft, and Uzi submachine guns. Under technical assistance contracts, Israel serviced Israeli planes in the Ecuadorian Air Force inventory as well as Boeing civilian aircraft flown by TAME and Ecuatoriana Airlines. Ecuador also reportedly employed Israeli security specialists as consultants in the fight against terrorism. In 1976 Ecuador became the first foreign country to order the Kfir, an advanced jet fighter equipped with the General Electric J-79 engine produced in Israel under license. The transaction, which required United States government approval because of the engine technology, was rejected by the administration of President Jimmy Carter in order to discourage the proliferation of sophisticated military equipment in the Third World. The action caused an uproar in Israel where the sale was regarded as an important breakthrough in Israel's efforts to develop international markets for the Kfir. In 1981, after the inauguration of President Ronald Reagan, Washington removed its objection to the sale. Although the contract called for the purchase of 12 Kfirs and an option to purchase an additional 12, Ecuador acquired only the original group, at a price estimated at US$196 million.

Ecuador became a relatively heavy importer of arms in the late 1970s and early 1980s, averaging US$150 million annually and reaching a peak of US$280 million in 1982. These imports declined sharply to an average of US$50 million annually between 1985 and 1987, presumably as a result of a dramatic reduction in oil revenues and the precipitous drop in the value of the sucre, which made imported arms extremely expensive. Between 1983 and 1987, Ecuador imported an estimated US$460 million of arms, primarily from Italy, France, the United States, and Britain. In 1995, during the Cenepa War against Peru, Argentina gave to Ecuador 6,500 tons of rifles, cannons, anti-tank rockets, and ammunition in a controversial move.

Recent times saw changes in Ecuador's foreign policy, as it decided to look for alternative weapon suppliers. These included its long-term allies Chile, which since 2008 has provided Leopard 1 tanks and Leander-class frigates. Israel delivered its unmanned aerial vehicles in 2009, and Brazil supplied additional military vehicles and Super Tucano combat aircraft. Countries like Russia and China have delivered small quantities of military equipment in the past, but have gained importance in recent years. Since then, Chinese radars, anti-aircraft systems, and infantry weapons have been purchased. In 2009 two additional Mil Mi-17 helicopters have been ordered from Russia with further deals planned. India has delivered HAL Dhruv helicopters and South Africa is about to deliver 12 Atlas Cheetah supersonic aircraft. Ecuador's political ally, Venezuela, has donated military equipment including six Mirage 50 aircraft.

In 2010, the U.S. embassy in Ecuador announced that it had delivered $1.2 million of donated military equipment to the Ecuadorian military. The donations were intended to support operations countering drug smuggling and guerilla activity along the Colombian border. Although the U.S. has refused to renew their lease on the Manta military airbase, deliveries included trucks, patrol boats, GPS, night vision, and M4 carbine rifles.

== See also ==
- History of the Ecuadorian–Peruvian territorial dispute
- Ecuadorian–Peruvian War (1857–1860)
- Military Governments of Ecuador (1960-1979)
- 2008 Andean diplomatic crisis
- Ecuadorian–Peruvian War
- Military of Venezuela
- Military of Colombia
- Military of Peru
