= ETAPA =

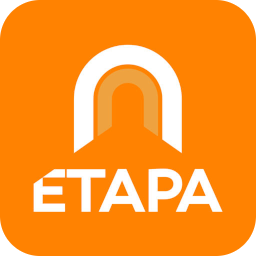

ETAPA (Empresa de Telecomunicaciones, Agua Potable, Alcantarillado y saneamiento de Cuenca) is a public utilities company owned and operated by the city of Cuenca, Ecuador. The company provides landline telephone, internet, water, and sewage services within the canton of Cuenca.

== Etapatelecom ==
Etapatelecom was spun off as a private company from ETAPA in 2002 so that it could sell telecommunications services across Ecuador, not just in Cuenca. The company expanded into other cities such as Quito and Guayaquil; however, the business plan was unsuccessful and by 2009 Etapatelecom had generated US$10 million in losses. The company was merged back into ETAPA in 2010 where it now operates as a business unit.
