= Ecuadorian Air Force =

Air warfare branch of Ecuador's military

- Fuerza Aérea Ecuatoriana
- Badge of the Ecuadorian Air Force
- Founded: 27 October 1920
- Country: Ecuador
- Type: Air force
- Role: Aerial warfare
- Size: 6,200; 72 aircraft
- Part of: Armed Forces of Ecuador
- Headquarters: Ministry of National Defence
- Anniversaries: 27 October
- Engagements: Paquisha War; Cenepa War; Ecuadorian security crisis
- Website: www.fae.mil.ec

Commanders
- Comandante General: Brigadier General Geovanny Espinel

Insignia
- Roundel

- Fin flash

Aircraft flown
- Utility helicopter: Bell 206, AW119, Eurocopter EC145
- Reconnaissance: UAV-2 Hawk
- Trainer: EMB 314 Super Tucano, Grob G 120TP, Diamond DA20 Katana, Cessna T-41 Mescalero
- Transport: C-130, Boeing 737, Boeing 727, Embraer Legacy 600, Falcon 7X, Gulfstream II, CASA C-295, DHC-6 Twin Otter, Super King Air, Piper PA-34

The Ecuadorian Air Force (Spanish: Fuerza Aérea Ecuatoriana; FAE) is the air branch of the Armed Forces of Ecuador.

== Mission ==
The FAE provides two different mission statements on its website in Spanish:

Desarrollar la capacidad militar aeroespacial, que garantice la defensa de la soberanía e integridad territorial; y, apoyar con su contingente al desarrollo nacional y a la seguridad pública y del Estado

Vigilar y proteger el espacio aéreo, empleando, desarrollando e impulsando el poder aéreo y espacial, para contribuir con la defensa de la soberanía e integridad territorial, la seguridad y paz del Estado

== Vision ==
The FAE provides two different vision statements on its website in Spanish:

Desarrollar la capacidad militar aeroespacial, que garantice la defensa de la soberanía e integridad territorial; y, apoyar con su contingente al desarrollo nacional y a la seguridad pública y del Estado

Ser una fuerza aérea multidominio, ágil y polivalente; líder en el desarrollo aéreo y espacial nacional.

== History ==
The FAE was officially created on October 27, 1920. However, like in many other countries, military flying activity started before the formal date of birth of the Air Force. The history of Ecuador is marked by many skirmishes with its neighbour Peru. As a direct result of the 1910 Ecuador-Peru crisis the members of Club de Tiro Guayaquil decided to expand their sporting activities into aviation as well. Renamed Club de Tiro y Aviación, they started an aviation school. Cosme Rennella Barbatto, an Italian living in Guayaquil, was one of the first members of Club de Tiro y Aviación. In 1912, Barbato was sent to his native Italy for training where he graduated as a pilot. He later returned to Europe a second time in 1915, where he participated in World War I. In 152 combat sorties he scored 18 victories, although only seven were confirmed. When he returned to Ecuador, his experiences served as motivation for a reduced group of Ecuadorian pilots, who moved to the Aviation School in Turin, Italy, with the objective of graduating as the first Ecuadorian pilots of the nascent Ecuadorian Military Aviation.

By 1939, the Ecuadorian Air Force was still limited to about 30 aircraft and a staff of about 60, including 10 officers. Military aviation did not start in earnest until the early forties when an Ecuadorian mission to the United States resulted in the delivery of an assortment of aircraft for the Aviation school at Salinas. Three Ryan PT-22 Recruits, six Curtiss-Wright CW-22 Falcons, six Fairchild PT-19A Cornells and three North American AT-6A Harvards arrived in March 1942, considerably boosting the capacity of the Escuela de Aviación at Salinas.

The 1950s and 1960s saw a further necessary buildup of the air force, gaining more units and aircraft. Meanwhile, efforts were made in enhancing the facilities at various airbases. In May 1961 the First Air Zone with its subordinate unit Ala de Transportes No.11 was founded. The Second Air Zone controlled the units in the southern half of Ecuador, Ala de Combate No.21 at Taura, Ala de Rescate No.22 at Guayaquil and Ala de Combate No.23 at Manta as well as the Escuela Superior Militar de Aviación "Cosme Rennella B." (ESMA) at Salinas.

The Ala 11 has its own commercial branch, like in many other South American countries, the Transporte Aérea Militar Ecuatoriana (TAME). Besides military transport aircraft, it also uses commercial airliners. Flying to locations off the beaten track, TAME provides an additional service to the people of Ecuador.

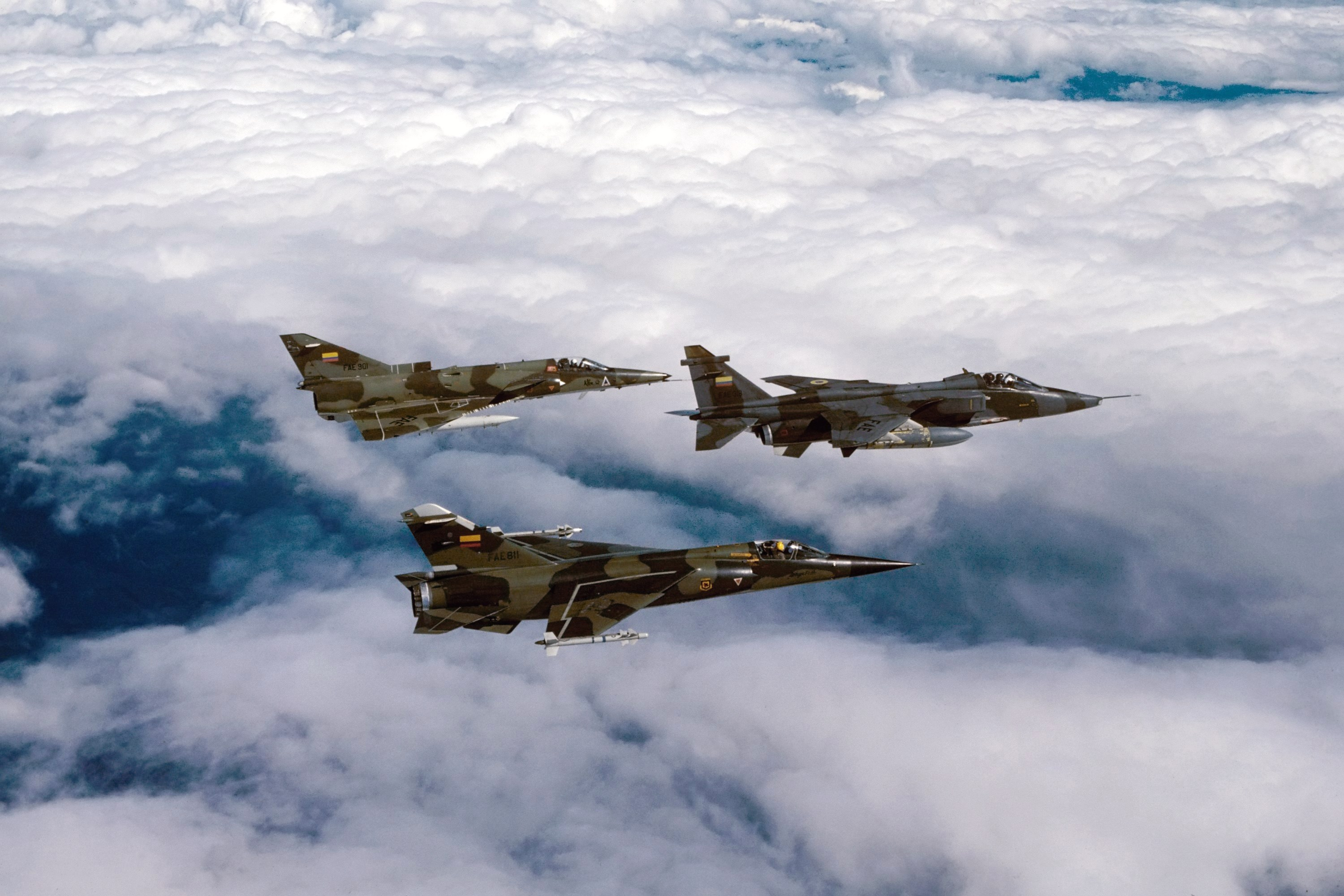
Three Ecuadoran Air Force Aircraft in 1986

The FAE saw action on several occasions. A continuous border dispute with Peru flared up in 1981 and 1995. Today the FAE faces the war on drugs as well as many humanitarian and logistic missions into the Amazon-region of the country.

== Structure ==
This is the current structure of the Ecuadorian Air Force:

- 21 Combat Wing (Ala de combate 21) - Taura Air Base
  - 2112 Combat Squadron Cheetah (Esc. de combate 2112 "Cheetah") - Used to operate until July 28, 2024 Atlas Cheetah
- 22 Combat Wing (Ala de combate 22) - Simon Bolivar Air Base
  - 2211 Combat Squadron (Esc. de combate 2211) - operating Cessna 206
  - 2212 Combat Squadron (Esc. de combate 2212) - operating TH-57
- 23 Combat Wing (Ala de combate 23) - Eloy Alfaro Air Base
  - 2311 Combat Squadron Dragons (Esc. de combate 2311 "Dragones") - operating A-29 Super Tucano
- 11 Transport Wing (Ala de transporte 11) - Cotopaxi Air Base
  - 1111 Transport Squadron Hercules (Esc. de transporte 1111 "Hercules") - operating C-130H/L100-30
  - 1112 Transport Squadron Avro (Esc. de transporte 1112 "Avro") - operating CASA 295
  - 1113 Transport Squadron Twin Otter (Esc. de transporte 1113 "Twin Otter") - operating DHC-6 Twin Otter
  - 1114 Transport Squadron Sabreliner (Esc. de transporte 1114 "Sabreliner") - operating Sabreliner
- Air Force Academy Cosme Rennella (Escuela Superior Militar de Aviacion "Cosme Rennella") - Salinas Air Base - operating Diamond DA20

== Aircraft ==
=== Current inventory ===
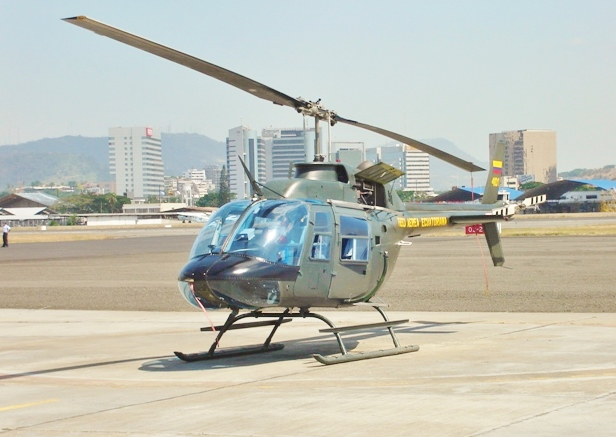
A Bell 206 Jet Ranger

Aircraft	Origin	Type	Variant	In service	Notes
Combat aircraft
EMB 314 Super Tucano	Brazil	Counter-insurgency aircraft		17	
Transport
Boeing 737	United States	VIP transport		1	
Boeing 727	United States	Transport / VIP		1	
C-130 Hercules	United States	Transport	C-130E/H	3	
CASA C-295	Spain	Transport / SAR		3	
Piper PA-34	United States	Utility		1	
Gulfstream II	United States	VIP transport		1	
DHC-6 Twin Otter	Canada	Utility / Transport		3	STOL capable aircraft
Super King Air	United States	Utility	350	1	
Military helicopters
Leonardo AW119	Italy	Utility	Mk II	4	
Eurocopter EC145	Germany	Utility		6	
Trainer aircraft
Bell 206	United States	Rotorcraft trainer		4	
Grob G 120TP	Germany	Trainer		8	
Diamond DA20 Katana	Austria	Trainer		19	One lost in accident in november 2024.

=== Retired ===
Previous notable aircraft flown included the Gloster Meteor FR.9, English Electric Canberra B.2, SEPECAT Jaguar ES, BAC Strikemaster Mk.89A, Mirage F1JA, Mirage 50EV, Republic P-47, PBY Catalina, Hawker Siddeley HS 748, Lockheed F-80C, IAI Kfir CE, Atlas Cheetah C, Lockheed AT-33A T-Bird, T-28 Trojan, Cessna T-37B Tweet, Cessna A-37B Dragonfly H-13 Sioux, HAL Dhruv.

=== Air defense ===
Name	Origin	Type	In service	Notes
Mobile surface-to-air missile system
9K33 Osa	Soviet Union	amphibious SAM system	2	obtained from Ukraine
9K38 Igla	Russia	MANPADS	222	
M167 VADS	United States	SPAAG	28	

== See also ==
- Military of Ecuador
- Ecuadorian Army
- Colombian Aerospace Force
- Peruvian Air Force
