= Ecuadorian Army =

Land component of Ecuadorian Armed Forces

- Ejercito Ecuatoriano
- Emblem of the Ecuadorian Army
- Founded: February 27, 1830; 196 years ago
- Country: Ecuador
- Type: Army
- Size: 25,650
- Part of: Military of Ecuador
- Engagements: Independence War 1820; Battle of Pichincha 1822; Gran Colombia–Peru War 1829; Ecuadorian–Peruvian War 1857–1860; Battle of Guayaquil 1860; Ecuadorian-Colombian War 1863; Chincha Islands War 1864; Ecuadorian–Peruvian War 1941; Paquisha War 1981; Cenepa War 1995; War on drugs in Ecuador 2018; Ecuadorian conflict 2024
- Website: Official website

Commanders
- Current commander: MG Javier D. Pérez Rodríguez
- Notable commanders: General of the Army Paco Moncayo; General Carlomagno Andrade. General Miguel Iturralde

Insignia
- Flag

- Roundel

The Ecuadorian Army (Spanish: Ejército Ecuatoriano) is the land component of the Ecuadorian Armed Forces. Its 25,650 active soldiers are deployed in relation to its military doctrine. The contemporary Ecuadorian Army incorporates many jungle and special forces infantry units into its structure.

== Main objectives ==
- To defend the national territory as part of a Joint Task Force.
- To represent a strong military image as part of the Ecuadorian Armed Forces, national as well as international.
- Take part in activities and support the development and co-operation in times of crisis.
- Take part in Peacekeeping and international security operations.
- To reach and maintain a high operational level within the Ground Forces.
- To represent, implement an integrated institution, within the operational system.
- To guarantee the disposition of prepared military personnel in order to accomplish all missions and assignments.
- To dispose of an investigations and development element, with focus on national defense.
- To correctly execute administration procedures involving all institutional issues.

== Mission ==
To develop territorial power, in order to accomplish institutional objectives, which guarantee the integrity and sovereignty of the national territory and contribute to the security and development of the nation, as well as to accomplish all objectives indicated by military strategic planning.

== Vision ==
To be an institution of the highest level and credibility, systematically integrated, with professional military personnel, orientated on ethics and moral. Capable of adapting itself to new requirements which guarantee peace, security and the nations development.

== History ==
The Ecuadorian Armed Forces' history could be traced as early as 1531, when civil war ravaged through the Inca Empire. In a key battle near Riobamba, where Huascar's troops were met and defeated by Atahualpa's troops. This did not save Atahualpa and his army from total defeat, only a year later at the Battle of Cajamarca against the Spanish conquerors.

It would take almost 300 years, when Ecuador's struggle for emancipation from the Spanish colonial rule would reach its peak at the Battle of Pichincha. Following a victory, Ecuadorian troops would become part of the Gran Colombian coalition. These were years in which warfare dominated. First, the country was on the front line of Gran Colombia's efforts to free Peru from Spanish rule between 1822 and 1825; then, in 1828 and 1829, the Ecuadorian troops would be in the middle of an armed struggle between Peru and Gran Colombia for the location of their common border. After the naval victory and the blockade of Guayaquil by the Peruvian army the land campaign became favorable to the great Colombians, the forces of Gran Colombia, under the leadership of Marechal Sucre and the Venezuelan general Juan José Flores, were victorious in the battle of the Portete de Tarqui but this result did not define the final result of the war. Months later, Gran Colombia dissolved for good. The Treaty of 1829 fixed the border on the line that had divided the Quito Audiencia and the Viceroyalty of Peru before independence.

By 1859 the nation was on the brink of anarchy. This led to a civil war and the first war between Ecuador and Peru, the Ecuadorian–Peruvian War of 1857–1860. Backed by Guillermo Franco (an Ecuadorian General) the Peruvian army led by General Ramón Castilla arrived in Guayaquil and forced Ecuador to sign the Mapasingue Treaty which declared the allocation of Peruvian lands null and forced the suspension of the Ecuadorian-English business. Accusing Guillermo Franco of treason for signing a treaty with the Peruvians, Gabriel García Moreno, allied with former enemy General Juan José Flores, attacked Franco's forces. After several battles, García Moreno's forces were able to force Franco's troops to retreat back to Guayaquil, the site of the final battle.

Ecuadorian troops would face their greatest challenge and defeat, when in 1941, under controversial circumstances, another Ecuadorian–Peruvian War erupted. A much larger and better-equipped Peruvian force, quickly overwhelmed the Ecuadorian forces, driving them back from Zarumilla and invading the Ecuadorian province of El Oro. The government of Ecuador saw itself forced to accept Peru's territorial claims. Subsequently, Peruvian troops withdrew from the invaded El Oro province. However, occasional clashes kept occurring and flared into another outbreak of serious fighting in January 1981 called the Paquisha War, for the control of three watch posts set up by Ecuadorian troops inside a disputed border area. The conflict ceased with the Peruvian army controlling the disputed area, evicting the Ecuadorian troops.

In 1995, Ecuadorian troops would become part of the longest-running source of armed international conflict in the Western Hemisphere when both sides encountered again in the Cordillera del Cóndor. The focus of all fighting would become a small outpost called Tiwintza by the Ecuadorians (and Tiwinza or Tihuintsa by the Peruvians) until the signing of a ceasefire. In 1998 the Brasilia Act was signed, where Perú was granted the disputed territory (Tiwinza).

== Structure ==
Already back in 1989 the Army was with around 40.000 troops nearly four times the combined strength of the Navy and air force. In 2003, it was structured into four independent Army Divisions operating around 25 Infantry Battalions. These battalions were implemented in Brigades which were not numbered consecutively but carried odd numbers in the series 1 to 27. All Brigades had also a Special Forces and engineer, or at least a communications and Logistic Support Company. As of 2008, along with the Air Force and Navy, the Army (also referred to as Land Forces) is undergoing a reform in order to maximize is joint capability. This process involves the creation of U.S. like Operational Commands. There are 4 Operational Joint Commands to be geographically distributed.

=== Leadership ===
The General of the Army is the highest rank of the Ecuadorian Army. Usually the Chief of Staff of the Army is also the General of the Army, and it is common for this general to hold the Chief of the Joint Staff position as well.

=== PATRIA I ===
Since 2009 a restructuring within the Ecuadorian Armed Forces has been launched under the name of PATRIA I. It was to be completed by 2011 and improve military structure, equipment, and operations within the Ecuadorian territory. The Ecuadorian territory has been also newly divided into five Joint Task Force Zones or Fuerzas de Tarea Conjunta, four on mainland Ecuador, with the fifth being the maritime territory (including the Galapagos Islands). Changes concerning structure and troop deployment as of 2010 are not available due to the fact that the Ecuadorian Armed Forces keep such information restricted.

- 1st North or Fuerza de Tarea Conjunta No. 1 "Norte", (HQ Ibarra).
- 2nd West or Fuerza de Tarea Conjunta No. 2 "Guayas", (HQ Guayaquil).
- 3rd South or Fuerza de Tarea Conjunta No. 3 "Cuenca", (HQ Cuenca).
- 4th Central or Fuerza de Tarea Conjunta No. 4 "Central", (HQ Quito).
- 5th Maritime or Fuerza de Tarea Conjunta No. 5 "Mar y Galapagos", (HQ ?).

=== Specialties ===
Speciality badges mirror the US practice.

- Infantry (Badge: Crossed Mauser 1895 rifles)
- Armoured cavalry (Badge: M4 Sherman with crossed lances)
- Artillery (Badge: Crossed Spanish era cannons)
- Engineer Corp (Badge: Castle)
- Signals (Badge: Crossed signal flags and a torch)
- Army aviation (Badge: Wing and propeller)
- Logistics (Badge: Sword and leaf)
- Special Forces
- Transportation (Badge: Wheel)
- Ordnance (Badge: Grenade)

=== Special forces ===
- The Military Intelligence remains until today the greater unit of the Intelligence Weapon of the Terrestrial Forces.
- The 9th Special Forces Brigade ''PATRIA'', consists of paratroopers, specialized as commandos, Operational Free Jumpers, mountain warfare, frogmen, snipers and dog guides.
- The Commando Special Forces School, the GEK-9 is an independent operating body transforming soldiers into future Commandos.
- The Counter-terror unit GEO (Grupo Especial de Operaciones), formed in 1985, it was trained by the US Navy Seals and the British SAS and maintains the highest standards.
- The 17th, 19th and 21st Jungle Brigades, trained and experienced in jungle warfare.
- The Jungle Warfare Special Operations Iwia Battalion No. 60, recruited from local warrior tribes like the Shuar, Záparo, Kichwa and Achuar.
- The Jungle Warfare and Counter-insurgency Iwia School is at Coca in the Oriente.
- The special boat detachments called ratas de río or fusileros fluviales (sea rats); three battalions with a strength of 550 men, equipped with forty Vector and Phantom tactical speed-patrol boats. These undergo a three-week training in the Special Forces center in Coca. In addition, the United States provides training and assistance.

=== Army aviation ===
The aviation element of the Army was formed in 1954 and originally named Servicio Aéreo del Ejército (SAE). It was renamed Aviación del Ejército Ecuatoriano (AEE) in 1978. From 1981 onward the flying elements were concentrated into an aviation brigade, effectively transforming the army aviation into an operational brigade within the army structure. Honouring the army aviation's role in the Paquisha War in 1981, the unit was renamed Brigada de Aviación del Ejército No.15 "Paquisha" (BAE) on July 1, 1987. Finally, in 1996 the BAE gained the status of a full arm within the army recognising its vital role in the Cenepa War of 1995. At present the BAE No.15 consists of:

- Grupo Aero del Ejercito No. 43 "PORTOVIEJO"
- Grupo Aero del Ejercito No. 44 "PASTAZA"
- Gupo Aero del Ejercito No. 45 "PICHINCHA"
- Escuela de Aviacion del Ejercito "CAPT. FERNANDO VASCONEZ"

=== Organization ===
As of November 2004, the Ecuadorian Land Forces Order of Battle was:

- I Army Division Shyris (HQ Quito)
  - 1st Armored Cavalry Brigade Galápagos
    - Presidential Horse Guards Squadron Tarqui Grenadiers
    - 4th Armored Cavalry Group
    - 6th Mechanized Cavalry Group
    - 12th Mechanized Cavalry Group
    - 16th Mechanized Cavalry Group
    - 28th Armored Cavalry Group
    - 36th Mechanized Cavalry Group
    - Horseback-riding school
  - 13th Infantry Brigade Pichincha
  - 9th Special Forces Brigade Patria
    - 24th Special Forces Group Rayo
    - 25th Special Forces Group Santo Domingo de los Colorados
    - 26th Special Forces Group Quevedo
    - 27th Special Forces Group Latacunga
- II Army Division Libertad (HQ Guayaquil)
  - 5th Infantry Brigade Guayas
- III Army Division Tarqui (HQ Cuenca)
  - 1st Infantry Brigade El Oro
  - 3rd Infantry Brigade
  - 7th Infantry Brigade Loja
  - 27th Artillery Brigade Bolívar
- IV Army Division Amazonas (HQ El Coca)
  - 17th Jungle Infantry Brigade Pastaza
    - 17th Special Forces Company
    - 49th Jungle Infantry Battalion
    - 50th Jungle Infantry Battalion
    - 51st Jungle Infantry Battalion
  - 19th Jungle Infantry Brigade Napo
    - 19th Special Forces Company Aguarico
    - 55th Jungle Infantry Battalion Putumayo
    - 56th Jungle Infantry Battalion Tungurahua
    - 57th Jungle Infantry Battalion Montecristi
  - 21st Jungle Infantry Brigade Cóndor (HQ Patuca)
    - 60th Special Forces Battalion Capitán Calles
    - 61st Jungle Infantry Battalion Santiago
    - 62nd Jungle Infantry Battalion Zamora
    - 63rd Jungle Infantry Battalion Gualaquiza
- Independent Units
  - 1st Foot Guards (Honor Guard) Battalion Libertadores (HQ Quito)
  - 23rd Engineers Command Cenepa (HQ Quito)
  - 25th Logistics Support Brigade Reino de Quito (HQ Quito)

== Equipment ==
Historically, the Army depended on a wide variety of foreign suppliers for virtually all of its equipment needs. Only in the 1980s did it begin to develop a modest domestic arms industry as the Directorate of Army Industries manufactured rifle ammunition, uniforms, boots, and other consumable items. The Army's present day equipment is mostly of western origins.

=== Equipment gallery ===
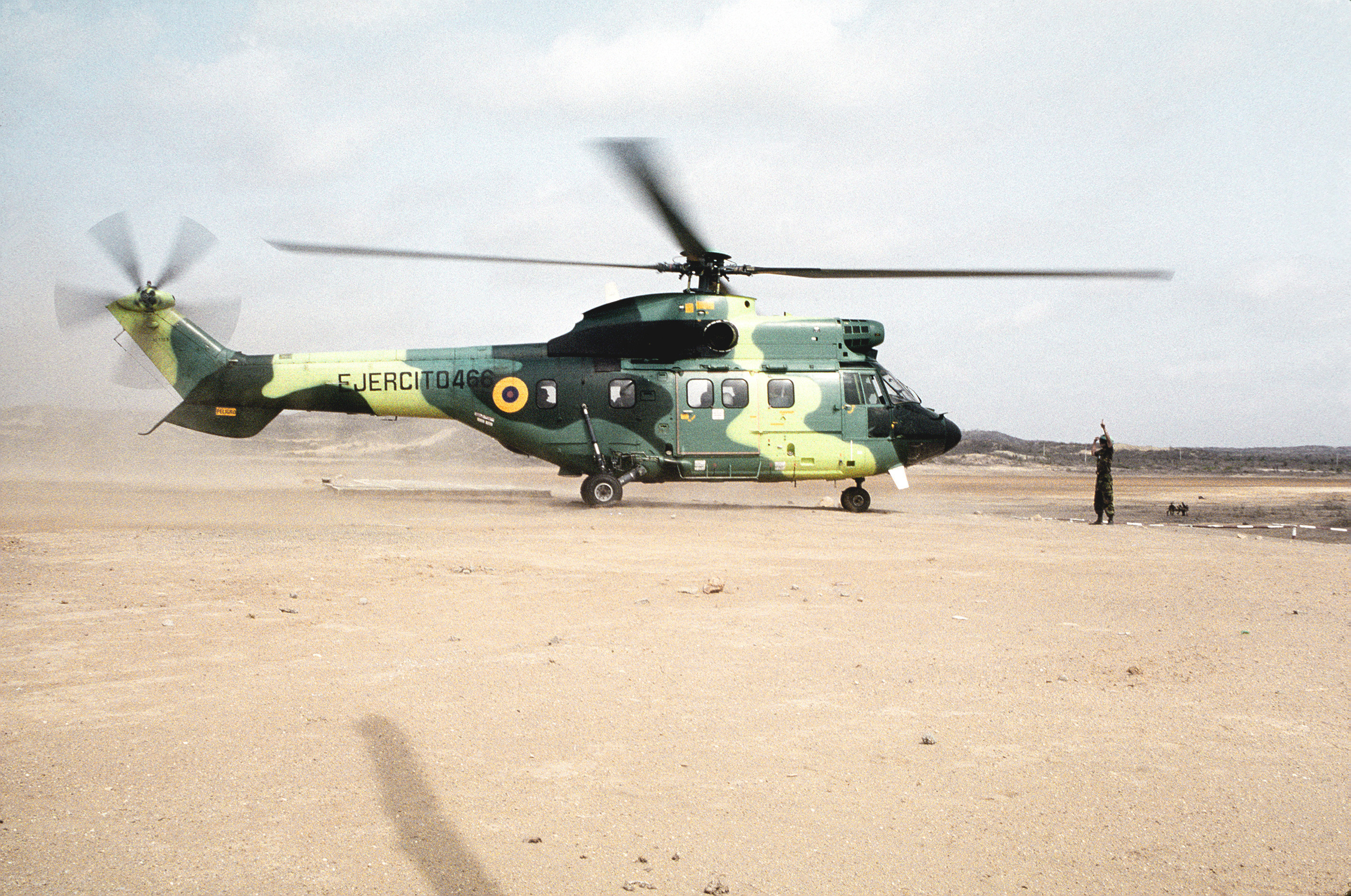
Ecuadorian AS532 Cougar of the Army's Aviation Branch.

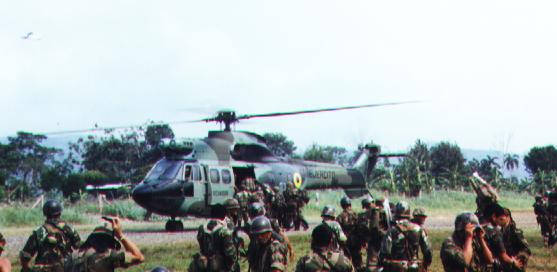
Photo taken during the Cenepa War, Ecuadorian Special Forces during a troop relief, near the Tiwintza area where fighting was particularly intense.

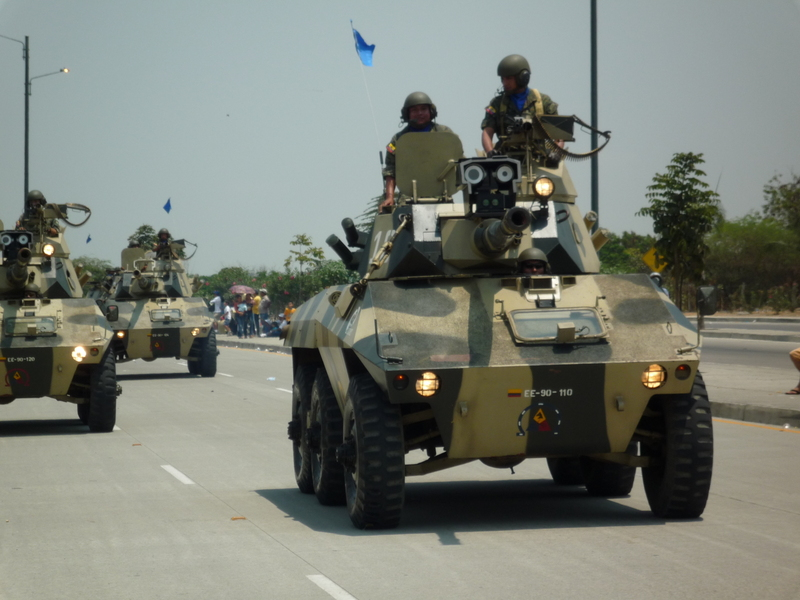
Ecuadorian EE-9 Cascavel during a military display.

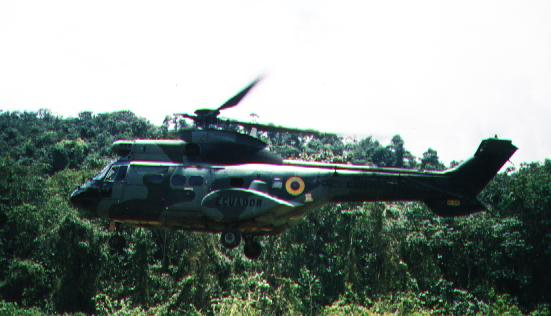
Ecuadorian Puma helicopter of the Army's Aviation Branch.

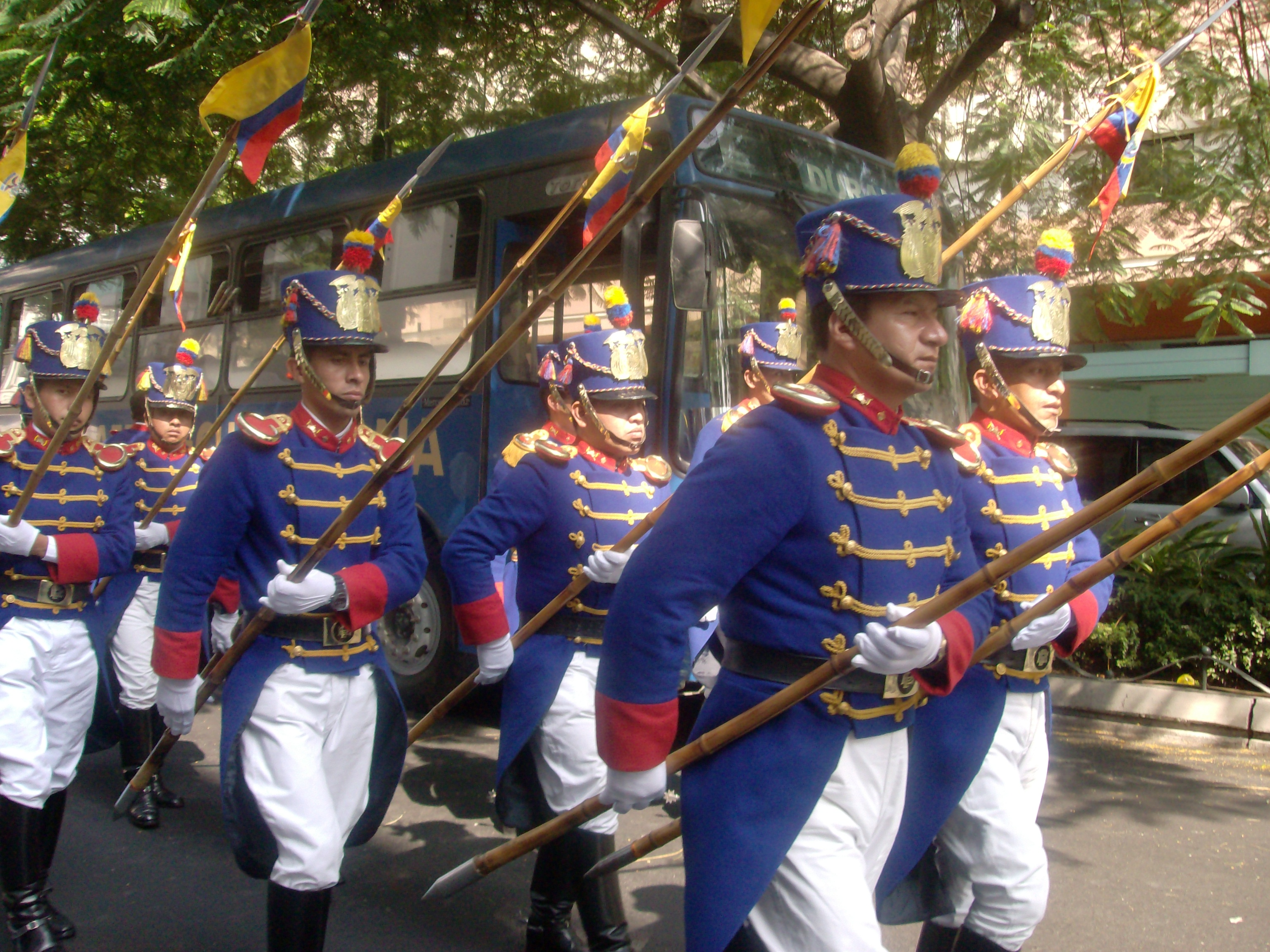
Tarqui grenadiers during a military parade.

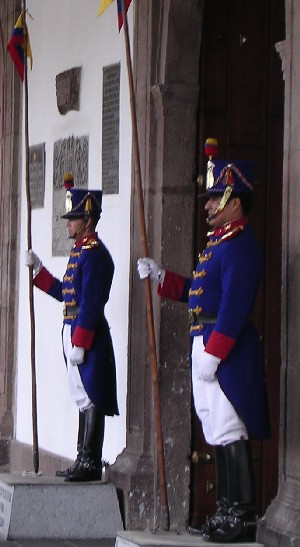
Uniform of the grenadiers dating from the time of the Battle of Tarqui, today worn by the presidential guard of honor at the presidential palace of Quito.

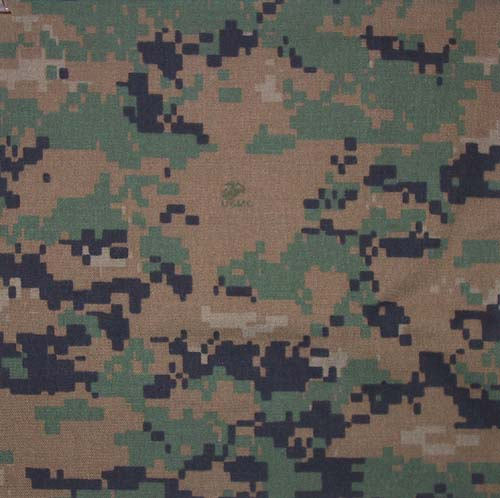
The MARPAT (short for MARine PATtern) is a pixelated camouflage pattern in use with the Ecuadorian Army.

'Woodland' is the name of the default camouflage pattern issued to the Ecuadorian soldiers.

== See also ==
- Military of Ecuador
- Venezuelan Army
- Colombian Army
- Peruvian Army
