= Ministry of National Defense (Ecuador) =

The Ministry of National Defense of the Republic of Ecuador is the ministry responsible for national defense and is responsible for all three branches of the Military of Ecuador. It is Ecuador's ministry of defense.

It also administers the various barracks, military zones and monuments to historical battles. The headquarters of the Ministry is in the city of Quito.

The ministry is part of the Secretary General of the National Security Council (Cosine).
