= Background to the Ecuadorian security crisis =

Internal conflict in Ecuador

- Part of Ecuadorian security crisis
- Map of cities that have experienced increased violence in 2024. Red indicates government control.
Date	27 January 2018–present
Location	Ecuador, specifically Guayas, Manabí, El Oro, and Los Ríos provinces
Status	Ongoing

Belligerents
Government of Ecuador: National Police of Ecuador; Armed Forces of Ecuador; Ecuadorian Army; Ecuadorian Navy; Ecuadorian Air Force; Armed civilians Counter-terrorist PMCs Supported by: United States; CIA; Canada; Colombia; Mexico (until 2024); Peru	Organized crime groups: Sinaloa Cartel; Los Choneros; CJNG; Los Lobos; Chone Killers; Los Tiguerones; Los Lagartos; Latin Kings; NETA Association; PCE-SR; FARC–EP; FARC dissidents; ELN; La Empresa; Other groups

Commanders and leaders
Daniel Noboa; Jaime Vela Erazo	José Adolfo Macías (POW); Fabricio Colón Pico; Jorge Luis Zambrano X; Antonio Camacho; Terry Israel Camacho

Units involved
159,250 military 46,727 police	Unknown

Casualties and losses
- Unknown

The background to the Ecuadorian security crisis covers the period before the outbreak of the Ecuadorian security crisis that started in 2020. The events that led to the security crisis started since the beginning of 2011, when then-president Rafael Correa put into effect a new law against trafficking of firearms and illicit drugs. The conflict is divided in two parts: the Ecuadorian government against the splinter groups of the Los Choneros cartel, and the confrontation amongst these satellite groups for dominance and hegemony.

The geographic location of Ecuador as a strategic transit route for drugs from Colombia and Peru into Mexico and later the United States and Europe was always a concern, but the evolution of the Colombian internal armed conflict and the remainders of the guerrilla forces of the Revolutionary Armed Forces of Colombia caused Ecuador to become more involved. The first major incident was an attack against law enforcement in San Lorenzo, which unleashed a wave of violence on the northern coast of the country. The main suspect in the attack was a FARC-EP dissident led by Ecuadorian drug traffickers.

At the end of 2019 the presence of European mafias in Ecuador was first documented. In 2020, during the COVID-19 pandemic, the crisis became latent with the entry of illegal weapons from Peru, one of the main sources of arms to armed gangs in Ecuador. Earlier in 2019, a prison crisis broke out in Guayaquil due to the city's prisons becoming important links of communication and confrontations between the armed groups. Later that same year the crisis spread to other prisons nationwide and violence reached the streets again in 2022.

In January 2024 the conflict reached a critical point when armed conflict broke out in Ecuador between the armed forces and several organized crime groups.

== History ==
=== Migration of the drug business ===
Since 2000 Colombia has fought a war on drugs with policy focused on the eradication of drug cultivation in the south of the country, specifically the departments of Putumayo and Nariño, which border Ecuador. Before then, illegal Colombian merchandise would pass through Ecuador using the coastline and jungle routes. When the drug traffickers were pressured by the Colombian government, they decided to migrate to other territories in neighbouring countries where they already had a sporadic presence, their main destinations were Ecuador and Peru.

By 2017 the United Nations Verification Mission in Colombia warned that the core of illicit crops in Colombia was increasingly approaching Ecuadorian territory, with 35% being located just ten kilometres from the Colombian-Ecuadorian border that year.

In 2021 BBC News described this migration as the "balloon effect" affecting the provinces of Esmeraldas and Sucumbíos, as well as neighbouring Colombia.

=== Closure of the US Manta base and politicization of the intelligence service ===
According to InSight Crime, the closure of the base serving the United States Armed Forces in Manta during the Rafael Correa government in 2009 was a key factor in the increase in criminal actions by armed groups since the American presence reportedly served as a deterrent so foreign gangs were expected to have increased influence in the drug business in Ecuador. The United States Air Force had also helped in the tracking and surveillance of the corridors used to transport merchandise. Likewise, InSight Crime reported that since 2013, violent crimes and seizures related to drug trafficking had skyrocketed from the previous year.

That same year the National Intelligence Directorate was closed in favour of the National Intelligence Secretariat, which, according to analysts, caused Ecuadorian intelligence to be politicized and become an instrument of the government in power to monitor its opponents at the expense of national security, since the Armed Forces of Ecuador saw their specialized intelligence capabilities limited, followed by a reduction in investment in the sector. That, together with the eviction of the Americans was said to cause the impoverishment of Ecuadorian military capabilities which followed.

=== Demobilization of the FARC-EP ===
The demobilization of the Revolutionary Armed Forces of Colombia – People's Army (FARC-EP) did not end all its military actions as its dissidents went from being an ideologized guerrilla into criminal gangs with heterogeneous objectives, entering Ecuador in alliances with local groups, Mexican Mafias and cartels.

The FARC-EP dissidents in Ecuador were the first to have links with criminal groups from Albania, Bosnia-Herzegovina, Croatia, Montenegro and Serbia. The Sinaloa Cartel arrived in 2003 in a discreet manner and the Jalisco New Generation Cartel in 2016, but both were limited to covert operations and forging local alliances.

== Belligerents ==
=== Gangs and armed groups ===
It has been reported that Los Choneros, who are allies and representatives of the Sinaloa Cartel, participate in the insurgency; while Los Lobos, Los Lagartos, Los Chone Killers and Los Tiguerones are from the Jalisco New Generation Cartel (CJNG). The FARC-EP dissidents are concentrated mostly in north-eastern Ecuador, with the Oliver Sinisterra Front having its own interests and the Urías Rondón Mobile Column being affiliated with the CJNG.

Many of those arrested and imprisoned for the 2018 San Lorenzo attack expanded their knowledge to make weapons and homemade bombs in the Esmeraldas prisons.

The Foundation for Peace and Reconciliation–Pares of Colombia notified that the National Liberation Army (ELN) also operates in Ecuadorian territory, including the following gangs of diverse origin: La Empresa, Gente del Orden, Guerrillas Unidas del Pacífico, Los Negritos, Los Mexicanos, Nuevo Grupo, Peasant Resistance, Steven Gonzáles Front and illegal mining.

=== Response from Ecuadorian authorities ===
The conflict itself broke out during the Lenín Moreno government, the Ecuadorian president defined the 2018 San Lorenzo attack as "The first terrorist attack in Ecuador", declaring a state of exception in the Province of Esmeraldas. Moreno in the context of the prison massacres openly said that these events were related to drug trafficking.

In the Government of Guillermo Lasso, the president also declared a state of emergency for the attacks in Guayaquil in August 2022 and offered a reward of $10,000 for anyone who collaborates with the search for the material and intellectual authors of the attack. For the attacks in November of the same year, Lasso suggested that human rights organizations defend the attackers.

== Security crisis ==
=== Ecuador's internal armed conflict of 2024 ===
The internal armed conflict in Ecuador broke out on 9 January 2024.

== See also ==
- Internal conflict in Peru
