= Ecuadorian security crisis =

Increased conflict of criminal organizations in Ecuador

- Part of violent crime in the illegal drug trade in Ecuador, spillover of the war on drugs, and the spillover of the Colombian conflict
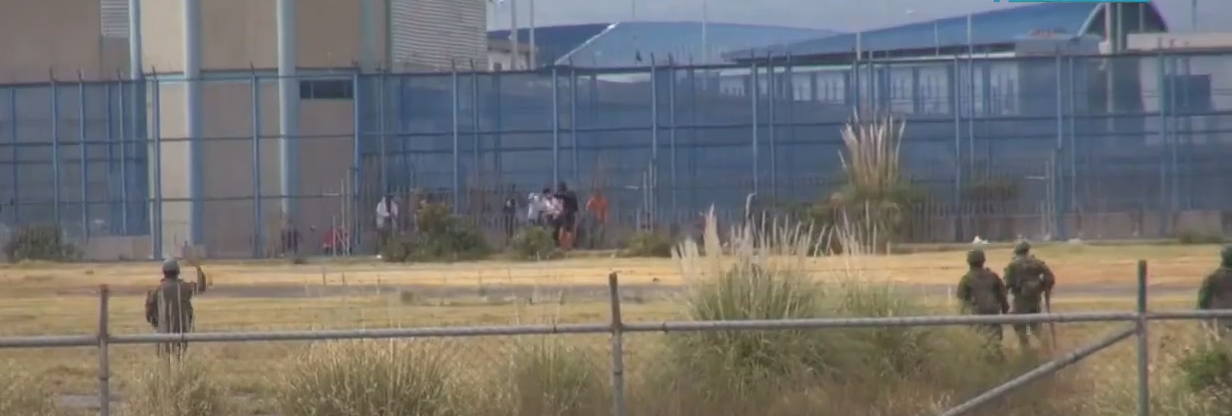
- Ecuadorian Army assaulting the Litoral Penitentiary, in Guayaquil
Date	2018/28 December 2020 – present
Location	Ecuador
Status	Ongoing

Belligerents
Ecuador; Armed Forces of Ecuador; National Police of Ecuador; Counter-terrorist PMCs; United States	Los Choneros; Latin Kings; Sinaloa Cartel	Los Lagartos; Los Lobos; Los Tiguerones; Los Chone Killers; Jalisco New Generation Cartel

Commanders and leaders
(Ecuador) Daniel Noboa; (Ecuador) María José Pinto; (United States) Donald Trump; (United States) Pete Hegseth; (United States) Francis Donovan; (United States) Terry Cole; (United States) John Ratcliffe; Former commanders: (Ecuador) Lenín Moreno; (Ecuador) Guillermo Lasso; (Ecuador) Jorge Glas; (Ecuador) María Alejandra Vicuña; (Ecuador) Otto Sonnenholzner; (Ecuador) María Alejandra Muñoz; (Ecuador) Alfredo Borrero; (Ecuador) Verónica Abad Rojas; (Ecuador) Sariha Moya; (Ecuador) Cynthia Gellibert; (United States) Joe Biden; (United States) Jim Mattis; (United States) Patrick M. Shanahan; (United States) Mark Esper; (United States) Richard V. Spencer; (United States) Christopher C. Miller; (United States) David Norquist; (United States) Lloyd Austin; (United States) Robert G. Salesses; (United States) Kurt W. Tidd; (United States) Craig S. Faller; (United States) Laura J. Richardson; (United States) Alvin Holsey; (United States) Evan Pettus; (United States) Robert W. Patterson; (United States) Uttam Dhillon; (United States) Timothy Shea; (United States) D. Christopher Evans; (United States) Anne Milgram; (United States) Derek S. Maltz; (United States) Robert Murphy; (United States) Mike Pompeo; (United States) Gina Haspel; (United States) David S. Cohen; (United States) William J. Burns; (United States) Tom Sylvester	José Adolfo Macías Villamar (captured); Jorge Luis Zambrano X	Leandro Norero Tigua X; Junior Roldán Paredes X; Fabricio Colón Pico; Nemesio Oseguera Cervantes X

Casualties and losses
Unknown	Unknown	Unknown

Since 2018, Ecuador has suffered a security crisis resulting from conflicts between criminal organizations with connections to drug trafficking.

In recent years, coca leaf production has risen in neighboring Colombia and Peru, with both cocaine and coca base entering Ecuador by land and leaving by sea. Ecuador is uniquely positioned to facilitate maritime drug trafficking given its location between these two countries and its ports on the Pacific coast.

Meanwhile, FARC and the Colombian government reached a peace agreement in the mid-2010s. Multiple groups fought to fill the vacuum left by FARC, and FARC members who opposed the peace deal relocated to Ecuador. Additionally, Ecuador's use of the United States dollar makes it easier for gangs to launder money.

Inter-gang conflicts began after the murder on 28 December 2020 of Jorge Luis Zambrano, leader of the criminal syndicate Los Choneros, considered one of the oldest and most dangerous in the country. Zambrano's death led to the criminal groups known as Los Chone Killers, Los Lobos, Los Pipos, and Los Tiguerones, which functioned as substructures of Los Choneros, to separate from the gang and start a war against its former leaders for control of the country's prisons and drug trafficking through a series of massacres and other criminal acts. A 2022 report by the Inter-American Commission on Human Rights said that the government had "lost control" of its prison system.

The focus of the violence was at first focused within the prisons of the country, with events such as the February 2021 Ecuadorian prison riots and the September 2021 Guayaquil prison riot, both of which occurred in 2021 and the second considered one of the bloodiest prison massacres in Latin American history. In total, 503 inmates were murdered in the country during 2021 alone.

In recent years, the wave of violence has also manifested itself outside prisons, and international criminal organisations now operate within Ecuador, including the Sinaloa Cartel, the Jalisco New Generation Cartel, and the Albanian mafia. This has been reflected in citizen perception, as shown by a survey carried out by the firm Click Research in October 2021, which indicated that crime was considered by the citizens as the biggest problem that the country was going through. The wave of violence has generated a sharp rise in the number of murders in the country. In 2021, the intentional homicide rate reached 14.04 per 100,000 people (the highest since 2011), compared to a rate of 7.8 in 2020. These figures continued to increase in 2022. The most violent areas in the country includes the cantons of Guayaquil, Durán and Samborondón. It saw 53 murders between January and February 2021 and 162 in the same period in 2022.

== Chronology of events ==
=== 2021 ===
==== February ====
- February 23: The February 2021 Ecuadorian prison riots on 23 February 2021, which left 79 inmates murdered, took place simultaneously at Turi Prison, Litoral Penitentiary and the regional prisons of Latacunga and Guayas. The massacre was perpetrated by members of Los Chone Killers, Los Lobos, Los Pipos and Los Tiguerones against Los Choneros, an organization of which they separated from.

==== March ====
- 5 March: Government minister, Patricio Pazmiño, resigns from office.
- 31 March: During a police operation in Guayaquil, five members of Los Choneros gang were arrested.

==== April ====
- 28 April: Clashes between members of Los Choneros and Los Lobos at Litoral Penitentiary left five prisoners dead and twelve injured.

==== May ====
- 29 May: The leader of Los Chone Killers, known as Ben10, was released after the prosecutor handling his case refrained from charging him.

==== June ====
- 4 June: During a police operation in different sectors of Guayaquil, fourteen members of Los Choneros were captured.
- 8 June: Two fishing boats are attacked with explosives and set on fire in Posorja, a rural parish of Guayaquil. At least one of them would have been owned by a leader of Los Choneros.
- 13 June: Clashes between gangs took place at Litoral Penitentiary, leaving one dead and six injured.

==== July ====
- 21 July: Simultaneous massacres took place at Litoral Penitentiary and Latacunga Regional Prison. The events left 27 inmates murdered. In the case of Litoral, the clashes had started after members of Los Choneros attacked Los Lobos, which caused them to murder inmates who worked in the prison garden and who were supposedly allies of Los Choneros. This in turn unleashed the clashes in Latacunga.
- 22 July: As a result of the massacre that occurred the day before, President Guillermo Lasso dismisses Edmundo Moncayo, director of the National Service for Comprehensive Attention to Persons Deprived of Liberty (SNAI). Fausto Cobo was appointed in his place.

==== September ====
- 13 September: A drone attack took place at Guayas Regional Prison. The devices generated explosions in the prison center in an attempt to assassinate Adolfo Macías and Júnior Roldán, leaders of Los Choneros.
- 27 September: Fausto Cobo leaves his post as director of the SNAI after Lasso appointed him director of the Center for Strategic Intelligence. In his place Bolívar Garzón Espinosa was appointed.
- 28 September: The September 2021 Guayaquil prison riot occurred. It left 123 inmates murdered, which made it the deadliest prison massacre in the history of the country and one of the deadliest in Latin American history.

==== October ====
- 14 October: Four inmates were found hanged at Litoral Penitentiary.
- 22 October: Olympic sprinter Álex Quiñónez was shot to death in a deliberate attack by hit men in the Colinas de la Florida sector of northern Guayaquil.
- 23 October: Seven inmates were found hanged at Litoral Penitentiary.
- 28 October: Lasso declares a 60-day state of emergency to deal with the security crisis. The emergency allowed the military to go out to patrol the main cities.

==== November ====
- 2 November: A shootout occurs at Litoral Penitentiary that leaves three prisoners dead.
- 6 November: During a police operation in Machala, five members of Los Lobos gang were arrested.
- 10 November:
  - Álex Salazar, leader of Los Tiguerones, was released from Litoral Penitentiary after serving 60% of his sentence.
  - After Salazar was released, clashes broke out at Litoral Penitentiary, leaving three dead.
- 12 November:
  - Three inmates who had escaped from Litoral Penitentiary were captured at dawn when they tried to re-enter the prison center bringing an arsenal of rifles, ammunition, grenades and dynamite.
  - The November 2021 Guayaquil prison riot occurred. It left 65 inmates murdered and began when members of Los Choneros attacked pavilion 2 of the penitentiary, which was under the control of Los Chone Killers. While Los Choneros focused their attacks against pavilion 2, inmates from the other pavilions attacked the transitory area of the penitentiary, which ended up being the place where the greatest number of murders took place.
- 14 November: Bolívar Garzón Espinosa, director of the National Service for Comprehensive Attention to Persons Deprived of Liberty (SNAI), submits his resignation. President Lasso temporarily entrusts the position to Fausto Cobo.
- 17 November: Michelle Macías, daughter of Adolfo Macías, who was one of the leaders of Los Choneros, was kidnapped in Manta along with a classmate after leaving class. Four days later, she was rescued by the National Anti-Kidnapping and Extortion Investigation Unit.

==== December ====
- 8 December: Lasso appoints Pablo Ramírez as the new director of the National Comprehensive Care Service for Persons Deprived of Liberty (SNAI).
- 16 December: Lasso signs an executive decree by which he creates a Commission for Penitentiary Dialogue and Pacification.

=== 2022 ===
==== January ====
- 21 January: A massacre occurred in the Playita del Guasmo sector of southern Guayaquil, after 15 subjects arrived in boats and shot at people who were in a sports field. The incident left 5 dead and 9 injured.
- 23 January: General Tannya Varela, Commander General of the National Police, was removed from office by President Guillermo Lasso. Her successor was General Carlos Fernando Cabrera.

==== February ====
- 1 February: A shooting took place at the Coop Unión de Bananeros, leaving one person dead and 4 wounded.
- 4 February: Simultaneous raids in the cities of Guayaquil, Quito, Quevedo and Samborondón lead to the capture of ten members of Los Lobos.
- 11 February: A new shooting occurred in the Playita del Guasmo sector of southern Guayaquil. The incident left four dead and one injured.
- 14 February: Two corpses were found hanging from a pedestrian bridge in Durán. Both victims had criminal records for drug trafficking.
- 20 February: A 21-year-old man was abandoned by unknown persons next to his home, in northern Guayaquil, with an explosive device tied to his head, it exploded moments later and scattered his remains in a radius of 30 meters.

==== March ====
- 6 March: Seven people were killed and three injured after an attack by hit men in the Las Malvinas sector of southern Guayaquil.
- 11 March: During a police operation in Quevedo, four members Los Choneros were arrested, including one of its leaders.
- 24 March: A massacre occurred at the Eclipse nightclub in Esmeraldas. The incident left five people dead and nine injured. Members of Los Tiguerones and Los Gangsters were involved in the event.

==== November ====
- 2 November: President Guillermo Lasso declared a state of emergency in the provinces of Guayas and Esmeraldas for the next 45 days following the killings of five police officers and the abduction of several prison guards by organized crime members.

=== 2023 ===
The murder rate of 46.5 homicides per 100,000 residents that year was the highest in Ecuador's history.

==== February ====
- 7 February: Omar Menéndez, a candidate for mayor of Puerto López Canton, and a teenage campaign worker were assassinated in Puerto López a few hours before polls opened in the local elections. Menéndez was posthumously elected.

==== July ====
- 24 July: Agustín Intriago, the mayor of Manta, was assassinated in the city. A local footballer was also killed.

==== August ====
- 9 August: Ecuadorian presidential candidate Fernando Villavicencio was assassinated while leaving a campaign rally in Quito. In a video, masked men claiming to belong to the Los Lobos crime group claimed responsibility for the attack. Shortly after, another video released in which men also claiming to belong to Los Lobos denied having a role in the attack.
- 14 August: Pedro Briones, a leader of the Citizen Revolution Movement party, was shot and killed in Esmeraldas Province.

=== 2024 ===
==== January ====
Map of 2024 Ecuador conflict Controlled by Ecuadorian Armed Forces Controlled by drug cartels

- 9 January: Violence succeeding the escape from prison of José Adolfo Macías Villamar escalates into armed conflict with a hostage-taking at a television studio in Guayaquil and an attack on the University of Guayaquil.
- 13 September: Maria Daniela Icaza, director of Litoral Penitentiary is fatally shot in her vehicle by suspected drug gang gunmen.
