= María Daniela Icaza =

Ecuadorian prison director and murder victim (died 2024)

María Daniela Icaza Resabala (ca. 1988/1989-September 12, 2024) was an Ecuadorian prison official who was the acting director of the Litoral Penitentiary (Spanish: Penitenciaría del Litoral), known officially as Center for Social Rehabilitation of Men No. 1 of Guayaquil (Spanish: Centro de Rehabilitación Social de Varones N. 1 de Guayaquil), the largest prison in Ecuador. The prison holds nearly 12,000 inmates. She was killed during a wave of violence against prison and municipal officials after gang violence put the country's prisons under military protection.

== Background ==
In 2011, María Daniela Icaza Resabala worked at Ecuador's Civil Registry. She earned a degree in social communication before joining the civil service. She was married, a mother of two children and the leader of a scout group. In 2016, she joined the Ministry of Justice and began work at the prison directorate, the National Service for Comprehensive Care for Adult Persons Deprived of Liberty and Adolescent Offenders (Spanish: Servicio Nacional de Atención Integral a Personas Adultas Privadas de la Libertad y Adolescentes Infractore). There, she began work at Litoral Penitentiary. Icaza had nearly a decade of experience working at the Penitentiary before she was promoted to acting prison director.

Prior to becoming director, Icaza Resabala had worked several roles in the prison, including ward director. According to colleagues, Icaza Resabala was noted for her integrity and rapport with inmates. She was reportedly involved in coordinating the release of inmates for medical consultations, a significant responsibility, as the prison had only rudimentary medical facilities.

=== Litoral Penitentiary ===
Icaza came to Litoral Penitentiary at a time when organized crime and drug violence had begun to change Ecuador's perception of safety, and the prison system was in a state of crisis. From 2021 to 2024, more than 400 deaths have reportedly taken place in Ecuadorian prisons due to gang violence. Litoral Penitentiary became known as the country's "most violent", after a series of deadly riots, violence and gang activity. Several notable incidents, including the February 2021 Ecuadorian prison riots, September 2021 Guayaquil prison riot, and November 2021 Guayaquil prison riot contributed to the institution's reputation.

After a string of incidents in 2021, rapporteurs from the United Nations Committee against Torture and Subcommittee on Prevention of Torture issued a press release abhorring the violence taking place in the country's prisons, and calling on Ecuador to commit to upholding a commitment to maintain security inside the prison system. These concerns were echoed in 2022, when human rights organizations, including Human Rights Watch highlighted security failings at Litoral. They put blame on prison officials for overcrowding, poor management and unsafe conditions at the penitentiary. Despite efforts, violence continued to thrive at Litoral.

In July 2023, 31 inmates were killed during riots, and over 120 guards were held hostage at Litoral. It required 2,700 members of the security forces to stop the fighting. The next month, the military returned to disrupt rioting once again after several inmates were killed. Amnesty International described the conditions at the prison as violating the human rights of detainees and their family members.

=== Villamar's escape and insecurity ===
In January 2024, drug lord José Adolfo Macías Villamar escaped from Litoral Penitentiary, where he was serving a thirty-four year sentence and where Icaza was serving as director. Villamar was said to have "significant control" of the prison prior to his escape.

After his escape, criminal gangs in Ecuador launched widescale attacks, including arsons, bombings, and a hostage situation on a newsroom. The actions led Ecuador's President Daniel Noboa to declare a state of emergency, calling in military support to control the violence. In the months that followed, the country continued to experience a growing security crisis due to increasing influence of criminal gangs. As prisons became headquarters for the gangs, on 15 January 2024, Noboa put the prison system under military control. Conjugal visits at Ecuadorian prisons, notably Litoral Penitentiary, were stopped under the new system.

=== Increased pressure on prison officials ===
In April 2024, a constitutional referendum gave increased military support to control crime in the country. On the same day as the referendum, the director of the El Rodeo prison was murdered in retaliation. Cosme Damián Parrales had been appointed director of the prison a week prior to his assassination. He was shot while eating with his wife at a restaurant. In May 2024, two prison officers from Litoral Penitentiary were killed in retaliation for enhanced security measures at the prison. In July, a riot at the prison led to the deaths of 18 inmates, with more wounded.

Under increasing pressure from inmate's families, in August, Icaza responded to press inquiries about the 7-month cessation of conjugal visits in Litoral prison to say the visits would resume under certain conditions. The visits were suspended after Villamar's escape.

On 31 August 2024, two prison officers were murdered on their way to work in the province of Guayas. On 3 September 2024, the director of Lago Agrio prison in Sucumbios province, Álex Xavier Guevara Angulo was killed in an armed attack while he was riding in a vehicle. Guevara Angulo was previously threatened by organized crime groups, and as a result had submitted resignation as director. According to his family, his resignation was not accepted by the SNAI and he was not provided protection.

== Incident ==
Murder of Maria Daniela Icaza Resabala
- Part of Ecuadorian security crisis
- Location: Kilometer 14.5 vía a Daule, north of Guayaquil
- Date: 12 September 2024; 18:00 – 18:32
- Target: Maria Daniela Icaza Resabala
- Attack type: Assassination
- Weapon: Firearm
- Deaths: 1
- Injuries: 1
- Perpetrator: Organized crime gangs operating inside the prison system
- No. of participants: 2
- Coroner: Laboratorio de Criminalística y Ciencias Forenses de Guayaquil

For nearly three months prior to her death, Icaza received specific threats on her life. Icaza reportedly told authorities about the threats. In an effort to protect herself, Icaza had stopped driving with her husband to work, and changed the route and colleagues she travelled with.

On 12 September 2024, Icaza was a passenger in a vehicle travelling on Vía a Daule in northern Guayaquil. She and colleague Byron Olaya had left the prison at the end of the work day. Early reports suggested around 18:00 while waiting in heavy traffic, two individuals on a motorcycle came up to the car she was riding in and fired several shots. Icaza was fatally injured and the car's driver, another prison officer, was critically injured. She died on the way to Guasmo Sur Hospital around 18:32. Icaza was 35 years old.

The attack took place approximately two kilometers from Litoral Penitentiary. The motorcycle the assailants were driving was found to have been stolen. Later reports indicated that additional vehicles were involved in the attack, including a red car and a white sport utility vehicle.

=== Aftermath ===
At the time of her death, Icaza did not have additional security for her protection. It is unclear if she had requested additional security prior to her murder. On 14 September, the National Police issued a statement reporting that there was no requirement to issue officers for Icaza's protection at the time of her death.

Upon learning of her assassination, Ecuador's former President Rafael Correa lamented the murder of a “wonderful and incorruptible” person.

On 15 September, authorities announced they had apprehended one suspect from Pascuales, and were holding them in custody for the crime.

On 16 September, Interior Minister Mónica Palencia said 28 public servants who had experienced threats have received protection. Icaza's widower, also a prison officer, requested protection due to specific threats to his and his children's lives.

=== Continued violence ===
On 19 September, another targeted attack occurred on two SNAI officials in a vehicle in Quito, Ecuador. Both were shot by assailants on a motorcycle when their car was stopped in traffic. Both individuals survived the attack and are in critical condition at a hospital.

== See also ==
- Crime in Ecuador
