= 2022 Ecuador prison riots =

Prison uprisings in Ecuador

In 2022, at least 77 inmates were killed during prison riots in Ecuador.

== Background ==
Ecuador is in between Colombia and Peru, which are the world's two largest cocaine-producing countries. It is severely affected by international drug trafficking and gang violence which is related to that. In 2021, about 300 inmates were killed in riots in Ecuadorian prisons. The Ecuadorian government says that the riots are caused by gang warfare over control of territory and drug trafficking routes.

== 2022 riots ==
On 3 April, at least 20 inmates were killed during a riot inside El Turi prison in Cuenca, southern Ecuador.

On 9 May, a riot broke out between members of rival gangs Los Lobos and R7 inside Bellavista prison in Santo Domingo, central Ecuador. Forty-four inmates were killed. The prison is situated 80 km (50 mi) north of Quito. A hundred and twelve inmates tried to escape during the riot, but were apprehended inside the prison grounds.

On 18 July, 13 inmates were killed and two more injured after a riot broke out again in the Bellavista prison in Santo Domingo.

On 3 October, 15 inmates were killed during a riot at Cotopaxi No 1 jail in Latacunga, Cotopaxi Province. This follows the assassination of Leandro Norero, drug baron, in this prison.

On 18 November, 10 inmates were killed during a riot in a prison in Quito.

== See also ==
- Ecuadorian security crisis
- Illegal drug trade in Latin America
- February 2021 Ecuadorian prison riots
- September 2021 Guayaquil prison riot
- November 2021 Guayaquil prison riot
