= United States Department of State list of Foreign Terrorist Organizations =

U.S. government list of designated entities

The United States Department of State maintains a list of Foreign Terrorist Organizations (FTO) in accordance with section 219 of the Immigration and Nationality Act of 1965 (INA). Most of the terrorist organizations on the list are Islamist extremist groups; the rest are nationalist/separatist groups, Marxist militant groups, drug cartels, or transnational gangs.

The Department of State, along with the United States Department of the Treasury, also has the authority to designate individuals and entities as subject to counter-terrorism sanctions according to Executive Order 13224. The Treasury's Office of Foreign Assets Control (OFAC) maintains a separate list of such individuals and entities.

== Identification of candidates ==
The Bureau of Counterterrorism and Countering Violent Extremism (CT) of the United States Department of State continually monitors the activities of groups active around the world to identify targets for the "terrorist" designation. When reviewing potential targets, S/CT looks at the actual attacks that a group has carried out, as well as whether the group has engaged in planning and preparations for possible future acts of violence or retains the capability and intent to carry out such acts.

== Designation process ==
Once a target is identified, the Bureau of Counterterrorism and Countering Violent Extremism prepares a detailed "administrative record", which is a compilation of information, typically including both classified and open source information, demonstrating that the statutory criteria for designation have been satisfied. If the Secretary of State, in consultation with the Attorney General and the Secretary of the Treasury, decides to make the designation, the United States Congress is notified of the Secretary's intent to designate the organization and given seven days to review the designation, as the INA requires. Upon the expiration of the seven-day waiting period, notice of the designation is published in the Federal Register, at which point the designation takes effect. An organization designated as an FTO may seek judicial review of the designation in the United States Court of Appeals for the District of Columbia Circuit not later than 30 days after the designation is published in the Federal Register.

Under the Intelligence Reform and Terrorism Prevention Act of 2004, the FTO may file a petition for revocation two years after the designation date (or in the case of redesignated FTOs, its most recent redesignation date) or two years after the determination date on its most recent petition for revocation. In order to provide a basis for revocation, the petitioning FTO must provide evidence that the circumstances forming the basis for the designation are sufficiently different as to warrant revocation. If no such review has been conducted during a five-year period with respect to a designation, then the Secretary of State is required to review the designation to determine whether revocation would be appropriate.

The procedural requirements for designating an organization as an FTO also apply to any redesignation of that organization. The Secretary of State may revoke a designation or redesignation at any time upon a finding that the circumstances that were the basis for the designation or redesignation have changed in such a manner as to warrant revocation, or that the national security of the United States warrants a revocation. The same procedural requirements apply to revocations made by the Secretary of State as apply to designations or redesignations. A designation may also be revoked by an Act of Congress, or set aside by a Court order.

== Legal criteria for designation ==
(Reflecting Amendments to Section 219 of the INA in the 2001 USA PATRIOT Act)

- It must be a foreign organization.
- The organization must engage in terrorist activity, as defined in section 212 (a)(3)(B) of the INA (8 U.S.C. § 1182(a) (3)(B)),* or terrorism, as defined in section 140(d)(2) of the Foreign Relations Authorization Act, Fiscal Years 1988 and 1989 (22 U.S.C. § 2656f(d) (2)),** or retain the capability and intent to engage in terrorist activity or terrorism.
- The organization's terrorist activity or terrorism must threaten the security of U.S. nationals or the national security (national defense, foreign relations, or the economic interests) of the United States.

== Legal ramifications of designation ==
- It is unlawful for a person in the United States or subject to the jurisdiction of the United States to knowingly provide "material support or resources" to a designated FTO. (The term "material support or resources" is defined in 18 U.S.C. § 2339A(b) as "currency or monetary instruments or financial securities, financial services, lodging, training, expert advice or assistance, safehouses, false documentation or identification, communications equipment, facilities, weapons, lethal substances, explosives, personnel, transportation, and other physical assets, except medicine or religious materials.")
- Representatives and members of a designated FTO, if they are aliens, are inadmissible to and, in certain circumstances, removable from the United States (see 8 U.S.C. §§ 1182 (a)(3)(B)(i)(IV)-(V), 1227 (a)(1)(A)).
- Any U.S. financial institution that becomes aware that it has possession of or control over funds in which a designated FTO or its agent has an interest must retain possession of or control over the funds and report the funds to the Office of Foreign Assets Control of the U.S. Department of the Treasury.

== Other effects of designation ==
The U.S. Department of State lists the following items as additional considered beneficial effects of designation:

- Supports efforts to curb terrorism financing and to encourage other nations to do the same.
- Stigmatizes and isolates designated terrorist organizations internationally.
- Deters donations or contributions to and economic transactions with named organizations.
- Heightens public awareness and knowledge of terrorist organizations.
- Signals to other governments U.S. concern about named organizations.

Official designation of a group as a Foreign Terrorist Organization also triggers more robust means of combat under the Authorization for Use of Military Force act enacted in 2001, which is still in force today.

== Groups designated as FTOs ==
As of September 10, 2026, the following organizations are designated Foreign Terrorist Organizations:

Designated Foreign Terrorist Organizations
Date added	Name	Region	Area of operations	Notes
October 8, 1997	Abu Sayyaf Group (ASG)	Asia	Philippines	62 FR 52650
October 8, 1997	Hamas (Islamic Resistance Movement)	Middle East	Palestinian Territories	62 FR 52650
October 8, 1997	Harakat ul-Mujahidin (HUM)	Asia	Pakistan	62 FR 52650
October 8, 1997	Hezbollah	Middle East	Lebanon	62 FR 52650
October 8, 1997	Kongra-Gel (formerly Kurdistan Workers' Party) (KGK)	Middle East	Turkey, Iraq, Iran, Syria	Formerly PKK, KADEK. 62 FR 52650.
October 8, 1997	Liberation Tigers of Tamil Eelam (LTTE)	Asia	Sri Lanka, India	62 FR 52650
October 8, 1997	National Liberation Army (ELN)	South America	Colombia	62 FR 52650
October 8, 1997	Palestine Liberation Front (PLF)	Middle East	Palestinian Territories	62 FR 52650
October 8, 1997	Islamic Jihad Group	Middle East	Palestinian Territories	62 FR 52650
October 8, 1997	Popular Front for the Liberation of Palestine (PFLP)	Middle East	Palestinian Territories	62 FR 52650
October 8, 1997	PFLP-General Command (PFLP-GC)	Middle East	Palestinian Territories	62 FR 52650
October 8, 1997	Revolutionary People's Liberation Party/Front (DHKP/C)	Middle East	Turkey	62 FR 52650
October 8, 1997	Shining Path (Sendero Luminoso, SL)	South America	Peru	62 FR 52650
October 8, 1999	al-Qa'ida	Worldwide	Afghanistan, Pakistan, Saudi Arabia	64 FR 55112
September 25, 2000	Islamic Movement of Uzbekistan (IMU)	Asia	Uzbekistan, Afghanistan	
June 16, 2026	Al-Tahrir (Tanzim-u Tahrir Al-Muvahhidin)	Worldwide	Turkey, Syria and Iraq	
December 26, 2001	Jaish-e-Mohammed (Army of Mohammed) (JEM)	Asia	Pakistan	
December 26, 2001	Lashkar-e Tayyiba (Army of the Righteous) (LET)	Asia	Pakistan	Later amended to include the Milli Muslim League.
March 27, 2002	Al-Aqsa Martyrs' Brigades	Middle East	Palestinian Territories	
March 27, 2002	Asbat an-Ansar	Middle East	Lebanon	
March 27, 2002	al-Qa'ida in the Islamic Maghreb	Africa, Middle East	Algeria, Mali, Niger	Formerly GSPC
August 9, 2002	Communist Party of the Philippines/New People's Army (CPP/NPA)	Asia	Philippines	
October 23, 2002	Jemaah Islamiyah (JI)	Asia	Indonesia	Also in Brunei, Malaysia, Thailand, Philippines, Singapore
January 30, 2003	Lashkar i Jhangvi	Asia	Pakistan	
March 22, 2004	Ansar al-Islam	Middle East	Iraq	
July 13, 2004	Continuity Irish Republican Army (CIRA)	Europe	Ireland, United Kingdom	
December 17, 2004	Islamic State of Iraq and the Levant (formerly Al-Qaeda in Iraq aka Tanzim Qa'idat al-Jihad fi Bilad al-Rafidayn (QJBR))	Worldwide	Iraq, Syria, Libya, Nigeria	Formerly Jama'at al-Tawhid wa'al-Jihad, JTJ, al-Zarqawi Network. Al-Nusra Front was considered an alias of Al-Qaeda in Iraq
June 17, 2005	Islamic Jihad Union (IJU)	Asia	Uzbekistan	
March 5, 2008	Harkat-ul-Jihad al-Islami (HUJI-B)	Asia	Bangladesh	
March 18, 2008	Al-Shabaab	Africa	Somalia, Yemen, Mozambique	
May 18, 2009	Revolutionary Struggle	Europe	Greece	
July 2, 2009	Kata'ib Hezbollah	Middle East	Iraq	
January 19, 2010	al-Qa'ida in the Arabian Peninsula (AQAP)	Middle East	Yemen, Saudi Arabia	
August 6, 2010	Harkat-ul-Jihad al-Islami (HUJI)	Asia	Bangladesh	
September 1, 2010	Tehrik-i-Taliban (TTP)	Asia	Pakistan	
November 4, 2010	Jaysh al-Adl (formerly Jundallah)	Asia	Iran	
May 23, 2011	Army of Islam (Palestinian)	Middle East	Palestinian Territories	
September 19, 2011	Indian Mujahideen (IM) (India)	Asia	India	
September 19, 2011	Jamaah Ansharut Tauhid (JAT)	Asia	Indonesia	
May 30, 2012	Abdullah Azzam Brigades	Middle East	Iraq	
September 19, 2012	Haqqani Network (HQN)	Asia	Afghanistan, Pakistan	
March 22, 2013	Ansar Dine (AAD)	Africa	Mali	
November 14, 2013	Boko Haram	Africa	Nigeria	
November 14, 2013	Ansaru	Africa	Nigeria	
December 19, 2013	al-Mulathamun Brigade	Africa	Algeria	
January 13, 2014	Ansar al-Shari'a in Benghazi	Africa	Libya	
January 13, 2014	Ansar al-Shari'a in Darnah	Africa	Libya	
January 13, 2014	Ansar al-Shari'a in Tunisia	Africa	Tunisia	
April 10, 2014	ISIL Sinai Province (formerly Ansar Bayt al-Maqdis)	Africa, Middle East	Egypt	
September 30, 2015	Jaysh Rijal al-Tariq al Naqshabandi (JRTN)	Middle East	Iraq	
January 14, 2016	ISIL-Khorasan	Asia	Afghanistan	
May 20, 2016	ISIL-Libya	Africa	Libya	
July 1, 2016	Al-Qa'ida in the Indian Subcontinent	Asia	Bangladesh, India, Pakistan	
August 17, 2017	Hizbul Mujahideen	Asia	Pakistan, India	
February 28, 2018	ISIS-Bangladesh	Asia	Bangladesh	
February 28, 2018	ISIS-Philippines	Asia	Philippines	
February 28, 2018	ISIS-West Africa	Africa	West Africa	
May 23, 2018	ISIS-Greater Sahara	Africa	Maghreb and West Africa	
July 11, 2018	al-Ashtar Brigades (AAB)	Asia	Bahrain	
September 6, 2018	Jama'at Nasr al-Islam wal Muslimin (JNIM)	Africa	Maghreb and West Africa	
April 15, 2019	Islamic Revolutionary Guard Corps	Asia	Iran	Branch of Iranian military.
January 10, 2020	Asa'ib Ahl al-Haq	Middle East	Iraq	Iran-aligned Shi'a militia group in Iraq.
January 14, 2021	Harakat Sawa'd Misr (HASM)	Africa	Egypt	
March 11, 2021	ISIS-Democratic Republic of the Congo	Africa	Democratic Republic of the Congo	
March 11, 2021	ISIS-Mozambique	Africa	Mozambique	
December 1, 2021	Segunda Marquetalia	South America	Colombia	
December 1, 2021	Revolutionary Armed Forces of Colombia – People's Army (FARC-EP)	South America	Colombia	
February 20, 2025	Gulf Cartel	Central America	Mexico, Texas, Louisiana, Georgia	Designated under Executive Order 14157 by President Donald Trump.
February 20, 2025	Jalisco New Generation Cartel	Latin America, Oceania, Europe, Asia	Mexico, United States, Australia, Colombia, Ecuador, Peru, Brazil, Venezuela, Chile, Bolivia, Paraguay, Guyana, Argentina, Uruguay, France, United Kingdom, Balkans, Italy, Spain, Japan, Thailand	Designated under Executive Order 14157 by President Donald Trump.
February 20, 2025	Mara Salvatrucha (MS-13)	Central America	Mexico, California, and Texas	Designated under Executive Order 14157 by President Donald Trump.
February 20, 2025	La Nueva Familia Michoacana Organization	Central America	Mexico, Belgium, China, Texas, New Mexico, North Carolina, Georgia, Washington, D.C.	Designated under Executive Order 14157 by President Donald Trump.
February 20, 2025	Northeast Cartel	Central America	Mexico	Designated under Executive Order 14157 by President Donald Trump.
February 20, 2025	Sinaloa Cartel	Latin America	Mexico, Guatemala, El Salvador, Honduras, Nicaragua, Costa Rica, Panama, Colombia, Bolivia, Peru, Ecuador, Venezuela, Brazil, Argentina, Belize, Guyana, Canada, United States	Designated under Executive Order 14157 by President Donald Trump.
February 20, 2025	Tren de Aragua	South America	Venezuela, Colombia, Brazil, Peru, Ecuador, Bolivia, Panama, Costa Rica, Chile, Mexico, Trinidad and Tobago and United States	Designated under Executive Order 14157 by President Donald Trump.
February 20, 2025	United Cartels	Central America	Mexico	Designated under Executive Order 14157 by President Donald Trump.
March 5, 2025	Ansar Allah (the Houthis)	Middle East, Asia	Yemen	Redesignated by President Donald Trump during his second term through Executive Order 14175, after initially designating them on January 11, 2021, a move that was reversed by the Biden administration on February 16, 2021. On March 4, 2025, the State Department announced the designation of the group as a Foreign Terrorist Organization, along with a $15 million reward for information leading to the disruption of Ansarallah's financial networks.
May 2, 2025	Gran Grif	Caribbean	Haiti	Gangs in Haiti.
May 2, 2025	Viv Ansanm	Caribbean	Haiti	Gangs in Haiti.
July 18, 2025	The Resistance Front	Asia	India	As a proxy of Lashkar-e-Taiba (LeT).
August 11, 2025	Balochistan Liberation Army and its alias Majeed Brigade	Asia	Pakistan (Balochistan), Iran (Sistan and Baluchestan), Afghanistan	Participant in the Insurgency in Balochistan which has been ongoing since 1948.
September 4, 2025	Los Choneros	South America	Ecuador	Gangs in Ecuador.
September 4, 2025	Los Lobos	South America	Ecuador	Gangs in Ecuador.
September 17, 2025	Harakat Ansar Allah al-Awfiya	Middle East	Iraq	Iran-aligned Shi'a militia groups in Iraq.
September 17, 2025	Harakat Hezbollah al-Nujaba	Middle East	Iraq	Iran-aligned Shi'a militia groups in Iraq.
September 17, 2025	Kata'ib al-Imam Ali	Middle East	Iraq	Iran-aligned Shi'a militia groups in Iraq.
September 17, 2025	Kata'ib Sayyid al-Shuhada	Middle East	Iraq	Iran-aligned Shi'a militia groups in Iraq.
September 23, 2025	Barrio 18	North America, Central America	Canada, El Salvador, Guatemala, Honduras, Mexico, United States	Also known as 18th Street gang.
November 20, 2025	Antifa Ost	Europe	Germany	
November 20, 2025	Armed Proletarian Justice	Europe	Greece	
November 20, 2025	Informal Anarchist Federation	Europe	Italy	
November 20, 2025	Revolutionary Class Self-Defense	Europe	Greece	
November 24, 2025	Cártel de los Soles	South America	Venezuela	High-ranking members of the Armed Forces of Venezuela involved in the international drug trade, including disputed President Nicolás Maduro.
December 17, 2025	Clan del Golfo	South America	Colombia	Drug cartel in Colombia.
January 14, 2026	Lebanese Muslim Brotherhood	Asia	Lebanon	Lebanese branch of Muslim Brotherhood.
March 16, 2026	Sudanese Muslim Brotherhood	Africa	Africa	Sudanese branch of Muslim Brotherhood.
June 5, 2026	Comando Vermelho	South America	Brazil	Brazilian criminal organizations.
June 5, 2026	Primeiro Comando da Capital	South America	Brazil	Brazilian criminal organizations.
July 2, 2026	Chone Killers	South America	Ecuador	Criminal organization in Ecuador.
July 16, 2026	Los Viagras	Central America	Mexico	Mexican cartel gang.
July 16, 2026	Juarez Cartel, aka La Linea	Central America	Mexico	Heavily armed unit of the Juárez Cartel.
September 10, 2026	Los Tiguerones	South America	Ecuador	Criminal organization in Ecuador.

== Delisted FTOs ==
The following groups have been removed from the Department of State's list as of July 2025, most due to having been disbanded and thus being no longer active.

Delisted Foreign Terrorist Organizations
Date added	Date removed	Name	Region	Area of operations	Notes
October 8, 1997	October 8, 1999	DFLP-Hawatmeh Faction (DFLP)	Middle East, Asia	Palestinian Territories	62 FR 52650
October 8, 1997	October 8, 1999	Khmer Rouge	Asia	Cambodia	62 FR 52650
October 8, 1997	October 8, 1999	Manuel Rodríguez Patriotic Front – Dissidents (FPMR-D)	South America	Chile	62 FR 52650
October 8, 1997	October 8, 2001	Japanese Red Army (JRA)	Asia	Japan	62 FR 52650
October 8, 1997	October 8, 2001	Tupac Amaru Revolution Movement (MRTA)	South America	Peru	62 FR 52650
October 8, 1997	October 8, 2001	Revolutionary Nuclei	Europe	Greece	62 FR 52650
October 8, 1997	October 15, 2010	Armed Islamic Group (GIA)	Maghreb, Africa	Algeria	62 FR 52650
October 8, 1997	September 28, 2012	Mujahedin-e Khalq (MEK)	Middle East, Asia	Iraq, Iran	62 FR 52650
October 11, 2005	May 28, 2013	Moroccan Islamic Combatant Group (MICG)	Maghreb, Africa	Morocco	
September 10, 2001	July 15, 2014	United Self-Defense Forces of Colombia (AUC)	South America	Colombia	
October 8, 1997	September 3, 2015	Revolutionary Organization 17 November	Europe	Greece	62 FR 52650
March 27, 2002	December 9, 2015	Libyan Islamic Fighting Group (LIFG)	Maghreb, Africa	Libya	
October 8, 1997	June 1, 2017	Abu Nidal Organization (ANO)	Middle East	Palestinian Territories	62 FR 52650
October 8, 1997	November 30, 2021	Revolutionary Armed Forces of Colombia (FARC)	South America	Colombia	62 FR 52650
August 20, 2014	May 20, 2022	Mujahidin Shura Council in the Environs of Jerusalem (MSC)	Middle East	Palestinian Territories	
October 8, 1997	May 20, 2022	Kahane Chai (Kach)	Middle East	Israel	
October 8, 1997	May 20, 2022	Gama’a al-Islamiyya (Islamic Group – IG)	Middle East	Egypt	
October 8, 1997	May 20, 2022	Basque Fatherland and Liberty (ETA)	Europe	Iberian Peninsula	
October 8, 1997	May 20, 2022	Aum Shinrikyo (AUM)	Asia	Japan	
December 10, 2012	July 7, 2025	Hay'at Tahrir al-Sham (HTS)	Middle East	Syria	HTS was designated as a terrorist organization, which was called al-Nusra Front until 2017, when it was al-Qaeda's Syrian branch.

== Controversies ==
The MEK had been designated a "foreign terrorist organization" in 1997 in order to improve relations with Tehran and then president Mohammad Khatami.

In November 2013, the State Department listed the Nigerian terrorist organization Boko Haram as an FTO. In 2014, Republican members of Congress criticized the State Department for not designating the group as an FTO earlier.

In August 2014, the Christian Science Monitor reported that U.S. military was coordinating with Kurdish forces in Iraq, including elements of the PKK, seemingly in violation of the ban on assistance to a designated FTO.

Since 2024, Congressman Joe Wilson has attempted to introduce a bill to designate the Polisario Front, a UN-recognized liberation movement in Western Sahara, as a terrorist group due to its alleged ties with Iran and Hezbollah. These allegations have been described as Moroccan misinformation and disinformation campaign. UN special rapporteurs Ben Saul and George Katrougalos found that the bill is inconsistent with the United States' international human rights law obligations.

== See also ==
- Executive Order 13224
- List of designated terrorist groups
- Specially Designated Global Terrorist
- U.K. List of Proscribed Groups
- State Sponsors of Terrorism (U.S. list)
