= History of Ecuador (1990–present) =

Ecuador is a country in South America.

== Ballén presidency ==
In 1992, Sixto Durán Ballén won his third run for the presidency. His tough macroeconomic adjustment measures were unpopular, but he succeeded in pushing a limited number of modernization initiatives through Congress. Durán Ballén's vice president, Alberto Dahik, was the architect of the administration's economic policies, but in 1995, Dahik fled the country to avoid prosecution on corruption charges following a heated political battle with the opposition. A war with Peru (named the Cenepa War, after a river located in the area) erupted in January–February 1995 in a small, remote region, where the boundary prescribed by the 1942 Rio Protocol was in dispute. The Durán-Ballén Administration can be credited with beginning the negotiations that would end in a final settlement of the territorial dispute.

== Bucaram presidency ==
In 1996, Abdalá Bucaram, from the populist Ecuadorian Roldosista Party, won the presidency on a platform that promised populist economic and social reforms. Almost from the start, Bucaram's administration languished amidst widespread allegations of corruption. Empowered by the president's unpopularity with organized labor, business, and professional organizations alike, Congress unseated Bucaram in February 1997 on grounds of mental incompetence. The Congress replaced Bucaram with Interim President Fabián Alarcón.

== Constitutional reform ==
In May 1997, following the demonstrations that led to the ousting of Bucaram and appointment of Alarcón, the people of Ecuador called for a National Assembly to reform the Constitution and the country's political structure. After a little more than a year, the National Assembly produced a new Constitution.

Congressional and first-round presidential elections were held on May 31, 1998. No presidential candidate obtained a majority, so a run-off election between the top two candidates - Quito Mayor Jamil Mahuad of the DP and the Right Wing Álvaro Noboa - was held on July 12, 1998. Mahuad won by a narrow margin. He took office on August 10, 1998. On the same day, Ecuador's new constitution came into effect.

== Mahuad's presidency ==
Mahuad concluded a well-received peace with Peru on October 26, 1998, but increasing economic, fiscal, and financial difficulties drove his popularity steadily lower. However, the coup de grace for Mahuad's administration was Mahuad's decision to make the local currency, the sucre (named after Antonio José de Sucre), obsolete and replace it with the U.S. dollar (a policy called dollarization). This caused massive unrest as the lower classes struggled to convert their now useless sucres to U.S. dollars and lost wealth, while the upper classes (whose members already had their wealth invested in U.S. dollars) gained wealth in turn. Under Mahuad's recession-plagued term, the economy shrank significantly and inflation reached levels of up to 60 percent.

== Ecuador since 2000 ==
On January 21, 2000, during demonstrations in Quito by indigenous groups, the military and police refused to enforce public order, beginning what became known as the 2000 Ecuadorean coup d'état. Demonstrators entered the National Assembly building and declared, in a move that resembled the coups d'état endemic to Ecuadorean history, a three-person junta in charge of the country. Field-grade military officers declared their support for the concept. During a night of confusion and failed negotiations, President Mahuad was forced to flee the presidential palace for his own safety. Vice President Gustavo Noboa took charge by vice-presidential decree; Mahuad went on national television in the morning to endorse Noboa as his successor. The military triumvirate that was effectively running the country also endorsed Noboa. The Ecuadorean Congress then met in an emergency session in Guayaquil on the same day, January 22, and ratified Noboa as President of the Republic in constitutional succession to Mahuad.

US Dollar has been the only official currency of Ecuador since the year 2000.

Although Ecuador began to improve economically in the following months, the government of Noboa came under heavy fire for the continuation of the dollarization policy, its disregard for social problems, and other important issues in Ecuadorean politics.

Retired Colonel Lucio Gutiérrez, a member of the military junta that overthrew Mahuad, was elected president in 2002 and assumed the presidency on January 15, 2003. Gutierrez's Patriotic Society Party had a small fraction of the seats in Congress and therefore depended on the support of other parties in Congress to pass legislation.

In December 2004, Gutiérrez unconstitutionally dissolved the Supreme Court and appointed new judges to it. This move was generally seen as a kickback to deposed ex-President Abdalá Bucaram, whose political party had sided with Gutiérrez and helped derail attempts to impeach him in late 2004. The new Supreme Court dropped charges of corruption pending against the exiled Bucaram, who soon returned to the politically unstable country. The corruption evident in these maneuvers finally led Quito's middle classes to seek the ousting of Gutiérrez in early 2005. In April 2005, the Ecuadorian Armed Forces declared that it "withdrew its support" for the President. After weeks of public protests, Gutiérrez was overthrown in April. Vice President Alfredo Palacio assumed the Presidency and vowed to complete the term of office and hold elections in 2006.

=== Rafael Correa (2007–2017) ===
On January 15, 2007, the social democrat Rafael Correa succeeded Palacio as President of Ecuador, with the promise of summoning a constituent assembly and bringing focus on poverty. The 2007-8 Ecuadorian Constituent Assembly drafted the 2008 Constitution of Ecuador, approved via the Ecuadorian constitutional referendum, 2008. The new socialist constitution implemented leftist reforms.

In November 2009, Ecuador faced an energy crisis that led to power rationing across the country.

Between 2006 and 2016, poverty decreased from 36.7% to 22.5% and annual per capita GDP growth was 1.5 percent (as compared to 0.6 percent over the prior two decades). At the same time, inequalities, as measured by the Gini index, decreased from 0.55 to 0.47.

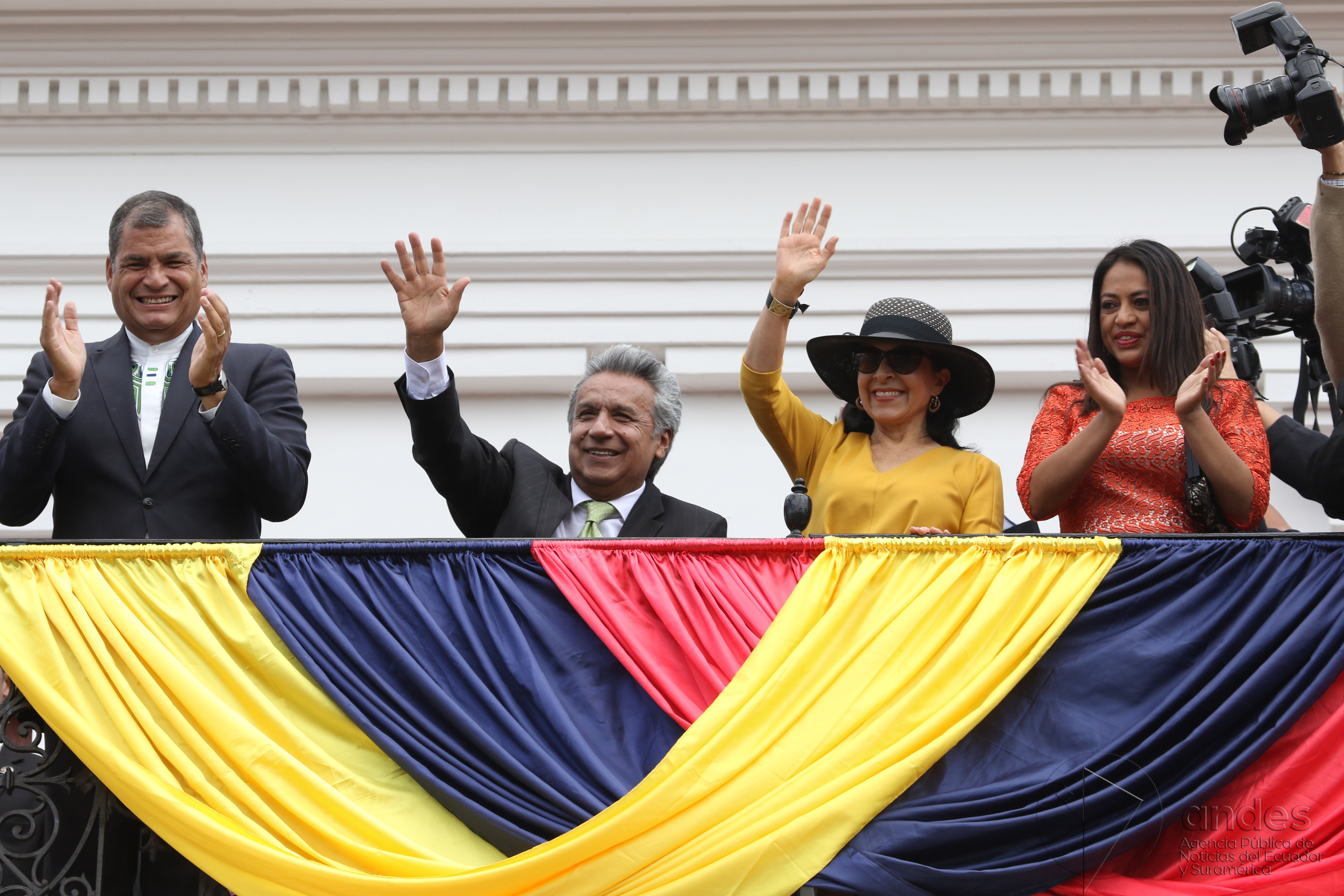
Former President Rafael Correa (left) attends President-elect Lenín Moreno's (middle) 'changing of the guard' ceremony. The two PAIS leaders were considered close allies before Moreno's "De-correaization" efforts started after he assumed the presidency.

Beginning in 2007, President Rafael Correa established The Citizens' Revolution, a movement following left-wing policies, which some sources describe as populist. Correa was able to utilize the 2000s commodities boom to fund his policies, utilizing China's need for raw materials. Through China, Correa accepted loans that had few requirements, as opposed to firm limits set by other lenders. With this funding, Ecuador was able to invest in social welfare programs, reduce poverty and increase the average standard of living in Ecuador, while at the same time growing Ecuador's economy. Such policies resulted in a popular base of support for Correa, who was re-elected to the presidency three times between 2007 and 2013. Media coverage in the United States viewed Correa's strong popular support and efforts to re-found the Ecuadorian State as an entrenchment of power.

As the Ecuadorian economy began to decline in 2014, Correa decided not to run for a fourth term and by 2015, protests occurred against Correa following the introduction of austerity measures and an increase of inheritance taxes. Instead, Lenín Moreno, who was at the time a staunch Correa loyalist and had served as his vice-president for over six years, was expected to continue with Correa's legacy and the implementation of 21st century socialism in the country, running on a broadly left-wing platform with significant similarities to Correa's.

=== After Correa era since 2017 ===
Rafael Correa's three consecutive terms (from 2007 to 2017) were followed by his former Vice President Lenín Moreno's four years as president (2017–21). In the weeks after his election, Moreno distanced himself from Correa's policies and shifted the left-wing PAIS Alliance's away from the left-wing politics and towards the neoliberal governance. Despite these policy shifts, Moreno continued to identify himself as social democrat. Moreno then led the 2018 Ecuadorian referendum, which reinstated presidential term limits that were removed by Correa, barring Correa from running for a fourth presidential term in the future. At his election, Moreno enjoyed an approval rating of 79 percent. Moreno's distancing from his predecessor's policies and his electoral campaign's platform, however, alienated both former President Correa and a large percentage of his own party's supporters. In July 2018, a warrant for Correa's arrest was issued after facing 29 charges for alleged corruption acts performed while he was in office.

Due to increased borrowing by Correa's administration, which he had used to fund social welfare projects, as well as the 2010s oil glut, public debt tripled in a five-year period, with Ecuador eventually coming to use of the Central Bank of Ecuador's reserves for funds. In total, Ecuador was left $64 billion in debt and was losing $10 billion annually. On 21 August 2018, Moreno announced economic austerity measures to reduce public spending and deficit. Moreno stated that the measures aimed to save $1 billion and included a reduction of fuel subsidies, eliminating subsidies for gasoline and diesel, and the removal or merging of several public entities, a move denounced by the groups representing the nation's indigenous groups and trade unions.

In August 2018, Ecuador withdrew from Bolivarian Alliance for the Peoples of Our America (Alba), a regional bloc of leftwing governments led by Venezuela.

In October 2018, the government of President Lenin Moreno cut diplomatic relations with the Nicolás Maduro regime of Venezuela, a close ally of Rafael Correa.

In March 2019, Ecuador withdrew from Union of South American Nations. Ecuador was an original member of the block, founded by left-wing governments in Latin America and the Caribbean in 2008. Ecuador also asked UNASUR to return the headquarters building of the organization, based in its capital city, Quito.

In June 2019, Ecuador agreed to allow US military planes to operate from an airport on the Galapagos Islands.

On 1 October 2019, Lenín Moreno announced a package of economic measures as part of a deal with the International Monetary Fund (IMF) to obtain US$4,209 millions in credit. These measures became known as "el paquetazo" and they included the end of fuel subsidies, removal of some import tariffs and cuts in public worker benefits and wages. This caused mass protests which began on 3 October 2019. On 8 October, President Moreno relocated his government to the coastal city of Guayaquil after anti-government protesters had overrun Quito, including the Carondelet Palace. On the same day, Moreno accused his predecessor Rafael Correa of orchestrating a coup against the government with the aid of Venezuela's Nicolás Maduro, a charge which Correa denied. Later that day, the authorities shut down oil production at the Sacha oil field, which produces 10% of the nation's oil, after it was occupied by protesters. Two more oil fields were captured by protesters shortly thereafter. Demonstrators also captured repeater antennas, forcing State TV and radio offline in parts of the country. Indigenous protesters blocked most of Ecuador's main roads, completely cutting the transport routes to the city of Cuenca. On 9 October, protesters managed to briefly burst into and occupy the National Assembly, before being driven out by police using tear gas. Violent clashes erupted between demonstrators and police forces as the protests spread further. During the late-night hours of 13 October, the Ecuadorian government and CONAIE reached an agreement during a televised negotiation. Both parties agreed to collaborate on new economic measures to combat overspending and debt. The government agreed to end the austerity measures at the center of the controversy and the protesters in turn agreed to end the two-week-long series of demonstrations. President Moreno agreed to withdraw Decree 883, an IMF-backed plan that caused a significant rise in fuel costs.

The relations with the United States improved significantly during the presidency of Lenin Moreno. In February 2020, his visit to Washington was the first meeting between an Ecuadorian and U.S. president in 17 years.

==== Lasso (2021–2023) and Noboa (2023–present) presidencies ====
The 11 April 2021 election run-off vote ended in a win for conservative former banker, Guillermo Lasso, taking 52.4% of the vote compared to 47.6% of left-wing economist Andrés Arauz, supported by exiled former president, Rafael Correa. Previously, President-elect Lasso finished second in the 2013 and 2017 presidential elections. On 24 May 2021, Guillermo Lasso was sworn in as the new President of Ecuador, becoming the country's first right-wing leader in 14 years.

In October 2021, President Lasso declared a 60-day state of emergency with the intention to combat crime and drug-related violence. In October 2022, bloody riot among inmates at a prison in central Ecuador caused 16 deaths, among them was the drug lord Leonardo Norero, alias “El Patron.” In Ecuador's state prisons there been numerous bloody clashes between rival groups of prisoners.

A series of protests against the economic policies of Ecuadorian president Guillermo Lasso, triggered by increasing fuel and food prices, took place in June 2022. Initiated by and primarily attended by Indigenous activists, in particular CONAIE, the protests were later joined by students and workers who were also affected by the price increases. Lasso condemned the protests and labelled them as an attempted "coup d'état" against his government.

As a result of the protests, Lasso declared a state of emergency. When the protests blocked roads and ports in Quito and Guayaquil, there were food and fuel shortages across the country as a result. Lasso was criticized for allowing violent and deadly responses towards protestors. The President narrowly escaped impeachment in a vote in Congress. At the end of June, protesters agreed to end their protests and blockades in return for an agreement by the government to discuss and try to address their demands.

Lasso proposed a series of constitutional changes to enhance his government's ability to respond to rising, largely drug-related crime. In a referendum in February 2023, voters overwhelmingly rejected his proposed changes. This result weakened Lasso's political standing. Meanwhile, Lasso's government faced accusations of corruption. Citing those accusations and claiming that the government had failed to meet its demands from June 2022, CONAIE called on Lasso to resign and declared itself in a state of "permanent mobilization", threatening additional protests.

On 15 October 2023, center-right candidate Daniel Noboa won the run-off of the premature presidential election with 52.3% of the vote against leftist candidate Luisa González. On 23 November 2023, Daniel Noboa was sworn in as Ecuador's new president.

In January 2024, an internal conflict in Ecuador broke out. Ecuador's president Daniel Noboa declared an "internal armed conflict" against organised crime, incosequence of an armed attack into a public television channel and the escape of imprisoned leader of Los Choneros cartel, José Adolfo Macías Villamar aka Fito. On 23 March 2024, Ecuador's youngest mayor, 27-year-old Brigitte García, mayor of San Vicente for the opposition The Citizens' Revolution, was shot dead. In April 2025, President Daniel Noboa won the run-off round of Ecuador's presidential election, meaning he will now serve a full four-year term. In June 2025, the powerful Ecuadorean gang leader "Fito" was recaptured and he was extradited to the US to face charges of drug and arms trafficking. In October 2025, five people were arrested following an alleged assassination attempt on President Daniel Noboa. In November 2025, the leader of Los Lobos, one of Ecuador's biggest drug-trafficking gangs, Wilmer "Pipo" Chavarria, was captured in Spain.
