= 2021 Ecuador prison riots =

2021 Ecuador prison riots may refer to:

- February 2021 Ecuadorian prison riots
- September 2021 Guayaquil prison riot
- November 2021 Guayaquil prison riot
