= November 2024 Guayaquil prison riot =

Prison riot in Ecuador

- Date: 12 November 2024
- Venue: Litoral Penitentiary/Guayas 1 Prison
- Location: Guayaquil, Ecuador; 02°03′09″S 79°56′42″W
- Type: Prison riot, massacre
- Cause: Gang rivalry
- Deaths: 17 inmates
- Injuries: 15

The November 2024 Guayaquil prison riot occurred on 12 November 2024 at the notoriously overcrowded Litoral Penitentiary/Guayas 1 Prison in Guayaquil, Ecuador, killing at least 17 and injuring 15 people in clashes of drug gangs with connections to Mexican and Colombian drug cartels.

== See also ==
- Prison riot
- Prison gang
- February 2021 Ecuadorian prison riots
- September 2021 Guayaquil prison riot
- July 2023 Guayaquil prison riot
