= Brazil–Ecuador relations =

Bilateral relations

- Brazil: Ecuador

Diplomatic relations between Brazil and Ecuador have existed since the mid-19th century and have been historically friendly. Both countries participate in multiple South America-based blocs; Mercosur, CELAC, and the Andean Community. The President of Brazil, Luiz Inacio Lula da Silva, has offered cooperation between the countries during the Ecuadorian security crisis. However, tensions arose in 2024 when Ecuador raided Mexico's embassy in Quito; Brazil criticized Ecuador for perpetrating the incident.

== History ==
=== 1844-1945 ===
In 1844, Brazil and Ecuador formally established diplomatic relations. A Brazilian diplomatic mission was opened in 1873, in Quito, Ecuador's capital city.

When Peru and Ecuador went to war in 1941, Brazil was quick to suggest that the countries should solve their disputes diplomatically. Brazil contributed to the Rio Protocol, the document aiming for the establishment of a resolution for the long-standing conflict between the two sparring nations.

During the Second World War, Brazil and Ecuador were both members of the Allies. On 22 August 1942, Brazil formally declared war on Italy and Germany. Ecuador joined after, on 2 February 1945, declaring war on Japan. Ecuador's direct role in the war was limited, but it did allow the United States to build military bases in its territory. Brazil, on the other hand, was the only Latin American country to directly send soldiers into combat during the war.

=== 1946-present ===
1980 saw the creation of the Latin American Integration Association, an organization with the objective of the "establishment of a common market". Brazil and Ecuador were both founding members of this organization. Brazil was the only country out of the pair that was a founding member the former organization that ALADI replaced, the Latin American Free Trade Association; Ecuador joined in 1961, one year after LAFTA was founded.

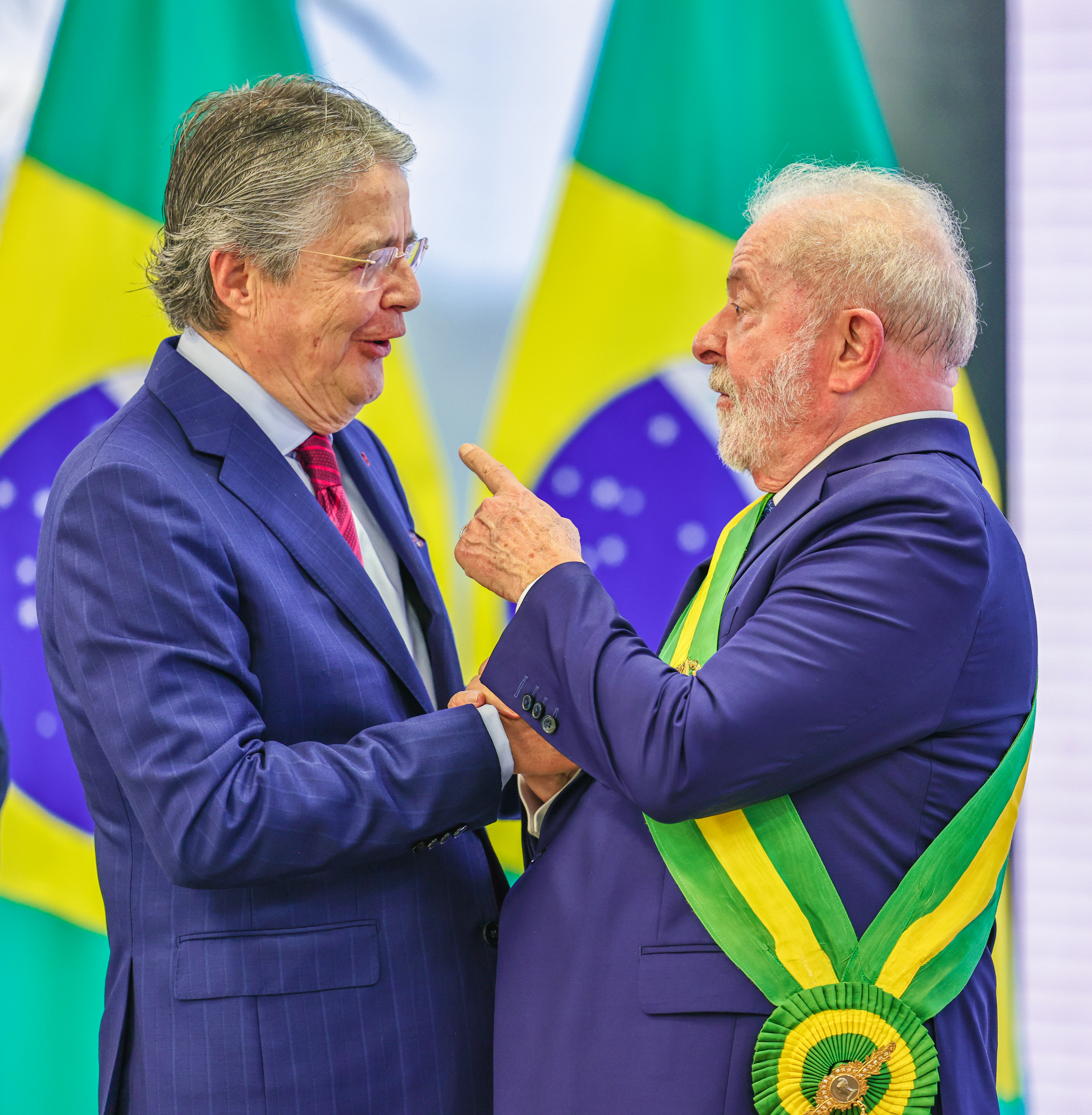
Brazil's president, Lula da Silva, and Ecuador's former president, Guillermo Lasso, meeting in 2023

In 1991, the Treaty of Asunción was signed, creating the Mercosur trade bloc, with Brazil being one of the founding parties. In 2004, Ecuador became a part of the bloc, joining as an associated member. Associated members, although able to benefit from reduced tariff prices, are not part of Mercosur's customs union. Another trade bloc that Brazil and Ecuador are in is the Andean Community, which Ecuador helped create in 1969; on the other hand, Brazil is only an associate member. Mercosur and the Andean Community are the main trade blocs of South America and have previously made agreements with each other.

Both countries are also full members of CELAC, another group of countries whose goal is to solidify the cultural and political bonds of its participants. The two nations have had numerous meetings and visits between government officials, and they have also supported each other through markets opened between the nations and agreements opening up investment. One such agreement was the Cooperation and Investment Facilitation Agreement Between the Federative Republic of Brazil and the Republic of Ecuador, a 2019 investment treaty aiming to encourage positive relations and create a plan for collaboration in investment between Brazil and Ecuador.

==== War on drugs ====
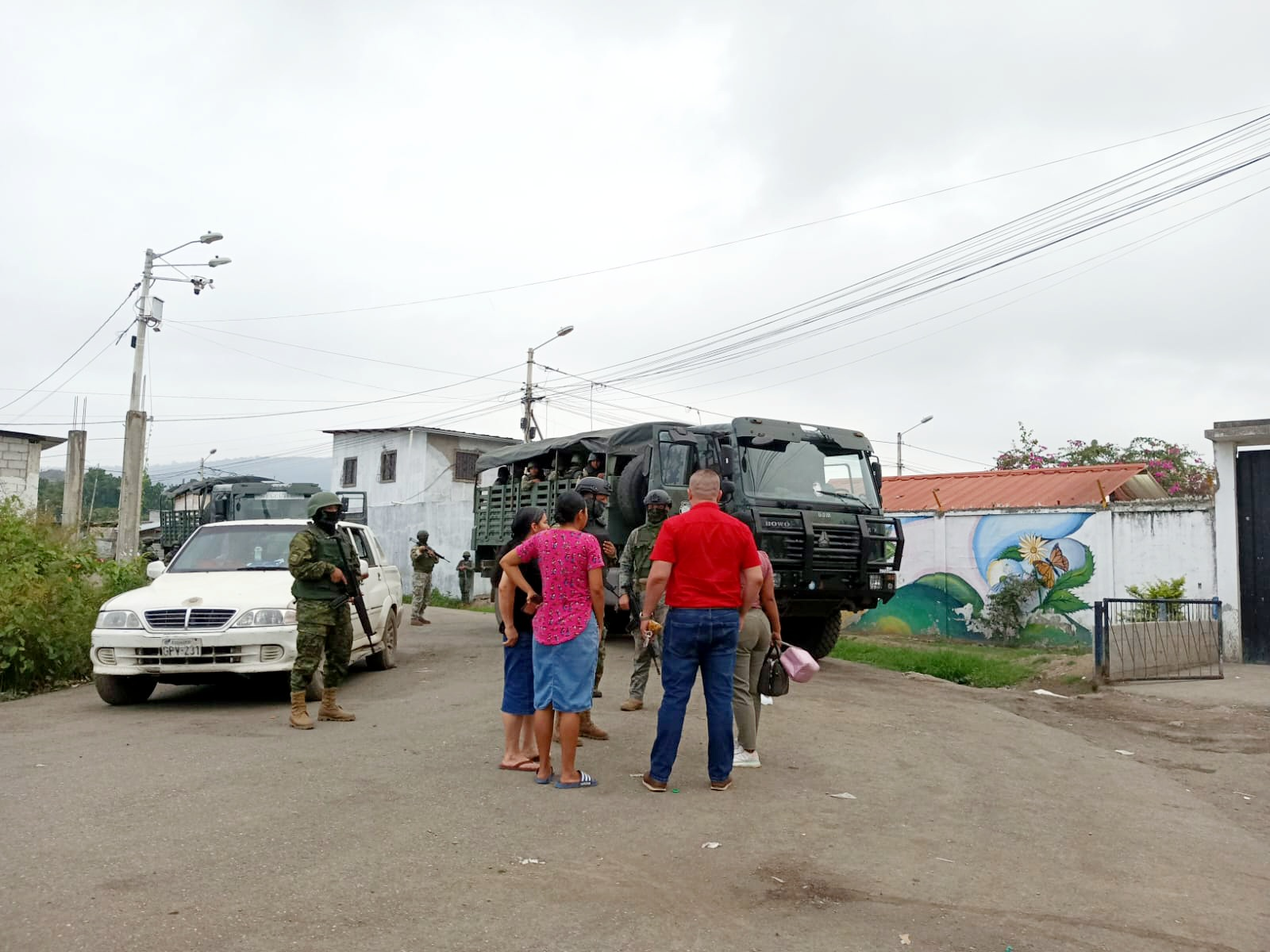
Ecuadorian military during the Ecuadorian Drug War

During the War on drugs in Ecuador, a particularly violent period for the country, Brazil has offered support and cooperation. During the Ecuadorian security crisis, a Brazilian national was captured for ransom by an Ecuadorian criminal gang, with the government of Brazil offering support for the kidnapped citizen. In April 2024, Ecuadorian forces initiated a raid on the Mexican embassy in Quito to arrest the former vice president who was facing charges of corruption. Brazil condemned Ecuador’s actions, calling it a violation of international norms.

== Trade ==
=== 20th century ===
In 1989, Brazil's exports to Ecuador consisted mostly of intermediate goods like raw materials (totaling about $100,000) such as metals and wood, although capital goods exports totaled over $45,000. Meanwhile, Ecuadorian exports to Brazil two years later were at only about $8,000; a majority of the products sent to Brazil were consumer goods and other miscellaneous products.

=== 21st century ===
During the time between 2017-2022, an increase in exports from Brazil to Ecuador arose, going from around $850 million USD to nearly $1.2 billion during the five-year period. The most exported products that Brazil sent to Ecuador in 2022 include automobiles, wheat, and iron. Conversely, in the same period of time, Ecuador’s exports to Brazil dropped from around $150 million to $130 million. Ecuador’s most exported goods to Brazil in 2022 were lead, fish, and copper.

== Resident diplomatic missions ==
- Brazil has an embassy in Quito.
- Ecuador has an embassy in Brasília and a consulate-general in São Paulo.

== See also ==
- Foreign relations of Brazil
- Foreign relations of Ecuador
