= November 2021 Guayaquil prison riot =

Prison riot in Ecuador

- Date: 13 November 2021
- Venue: Litoral Penitentiary
- Location: Guayaquil, Ecuador; 02°03′09″S 79°56′42″W
- Type: Prison riot, massacre
- Cause: Gang rivalry
- Deaths: 68 inmates
- Injuries: 25

The November 2021 Guayaquil prison riot occurred on 13 November 2021 at the Litoral Penitentiary in Guayaquil, Ecuador, killing at least 68 people and injuring 25.

== Incident ==
According to Ecuadorian police, the violence might have started as a consequence of the release of the leader of the gang Los Tiguerones after serving a part of his sentence for stealing car parts. Although Tiguerones controlled pavilion 8, they were allies of Los Chone Killers who controlled pavilion 2 and where the massacre took place. Reports say signs of a riot were incoming as inmates had heard chatter the day before that pavilion 2 would be the target.

The attack was launched at 7pm local time on 13 November 2021, when prisoners from pavilions 3, 6 and 12 (all controlled by the gang Los Choneros), tried to enter pavilion 2 of the prison, where 700 inmates were kept, by blowing holes in the walls with dynamite. The prisoners used machetes, guns, and explosives devices to kill their victims, multiple fires were also set. By the end of the riot 68 prisoners were killed and 25 injured.

As pavilion 2 is the transitory facility, where prisoners that have not been sentenced yet or who are appealing their sentences are housed, many of the victims were imprisoned for minor crimes. Among those killed was a trans woman who was housed in the men's jail and Víctor Guaillas, a human rights activist who was imprisoned since 2019 after participating in protests against president Lenín Moreno.

== See also ==
- Prison riot
- Prison gang
- February 2021 Ecuadorian prison riots
- September 2021 Guayaquil prison riot
- July 2023 Guayaquil prison riot
- November 2024 Guayaquil prison riot
