= Executive Order 14175 =

2025 initiation of Houthi terrorist status process

- "Designation Of Ansar Allah as a Foreign Terrorist Organization"
- Type: Executive order
- Number: 14175
- President: Donald Trump
- Signed: January 22, 2025

Federal Register details
- Federal Register document number: 2025-02103
- Publication date: January 22, 2025

Summary
- Initiate the process of designating Ansar Allah (the Houthis) as a Foreign Terrorist Organization

Executive Order 14175, titled "Designation Of Ansar Allah as a Foreign Terrorist Organization", is an executive order signed by Donald Trump, the 47th President of the United States, on January 22, 2025. The executive order aims to initiate the process of designating Ansar Allah (the Houthis) from Yemen as a Foreign Terrorist Organization under U.S. law.

== Background ==
The ongoing conflict is a part of the Red Sea crisis, Yemeni crisis, and the Yemeni civil war (2014–present). This includes attacks in which Houthi forces have damaged at least 28 ships in response to the Israeli invasion of the Gaza Strip. These attacks have taken place in the Red Sea, the Bab-el-Mandeb Strait, and the Gulf of Aden since 19 October 2023.

=== First Trump Presidency ===
President Trump during his first term designated the group as "foreign terrorist organization" and "Specially Designated Global Terrorist" (SDGT).

=== Under Biden ===
Weeks after coming into office President Biden reversed the first Trump administrations designations after Secretary of State Antony Blinken cited "recognition of the dire humanitarian situation in Yemen". In January 2024, President Biden reimposed the SDGT designation of the two classifications he had previously removed. This was in response to the rebel groups attacks on shipping lanes in then Red Sea.

=== Second Trump Presidency ===
Marco Rubio had called for the designation during his time as senator, and he had been directed to recommend the listing of the rebel group. With Rubio now the Secretary of State, the executive order now directs him to submit a report within 30 days after consultation with the Director of National Security and the Secretary of the Treasury. Trump’s executive order came just hours after the Houthis had released the crew of the Galaxy Leader cargo vessel, that was seized by the Iran-aligned group after the start of Israel's war in Gaza. 25 crew members were granted release as part of its efforts to support the January 2025 Gaza war ceasefire.

== Provisions ==
The executive order sets in motion the process for Ansar Allah, also known as the Houthis, shall be considered for designation as a Foreign Terrorist Organization, consistent with section 219 of the INA (8 U.S.C. 1189).

This also reiterates the policy of the United States to eliminate Ansar Allah's capabilities and operations, deprive it of resources, and thereby end its attacks.

The Secretary of State has 30 days to submit a report to the President, through the National Security Council, concerning the designation of Ansar Allah as a foreign terrorist organization consistent with 8 U.S.C. 1189.

15 days after submitting the report, the Secretary of State shall take all appropriate action, consistent with 8 U.S.C. 1189, with regards to a designation of Ansar Allah as a terrorist organization.

If Ansar Allah is designated as a foreign terrorist organization under 8 U.S.C. 1189, the Secretary of State and the Administrator of the United States Agency for International Development (USAID) will review the United Nations partners, nongovernmental organizations, and contractors through which USAID works in Yemen, and identify any entities with a relationship with USAID that has made payments to members of, or governmental entities controlled by, Ansar Allah or has criticized international efforts to counter Ansar Allah while failing to document Ansar Allah's abuses sufficiently. The Administrator of USAID is required to take all appropriate action to terminate the projects, grants, or contracts identified to have done such as listed above.

== See also ==
- List of executive orders in the first presidency of Donald Trump
- List of executive actions by Joe Biden
- List of executive orders in the second presidency of Donald Trump
- Yemeni civil war (2014–present)
- Gaza war
