= Litoral Penitentiary =

Prison in Ecuador

Litoral Penitentiary/Guayas 1 Prison
- Location within Ecuador
- Location: Guayaquil; 02°03′09″S 79°56′42″W
- Status: Operational
- Capacity: 5,000

The Litoral Penitentiary/Guayas 1 Prison (Spanish: Penitenciaría del Litoral), known officially as Center for Social Rehabilitation of Men No. 1 of Guayaquil (Spanish: Centro de Rehabilitación Social de Varones N. 1 de Guayaquil), is the largest prison in Ecuador. It is located 16.5 km (10.3 mi) from Vía a Daule, on the outskirts of Guayaquil. The prison has twelve pavilions and has a capacity of five thousand inmates, although by July 2021 it housed around ten thousand. It is part of the Guayas Penitentiary Complex, which also includes the Guayas Regional Rehabilitation Center, La Roca Prison and the Provisional Detention Center.

== History ==
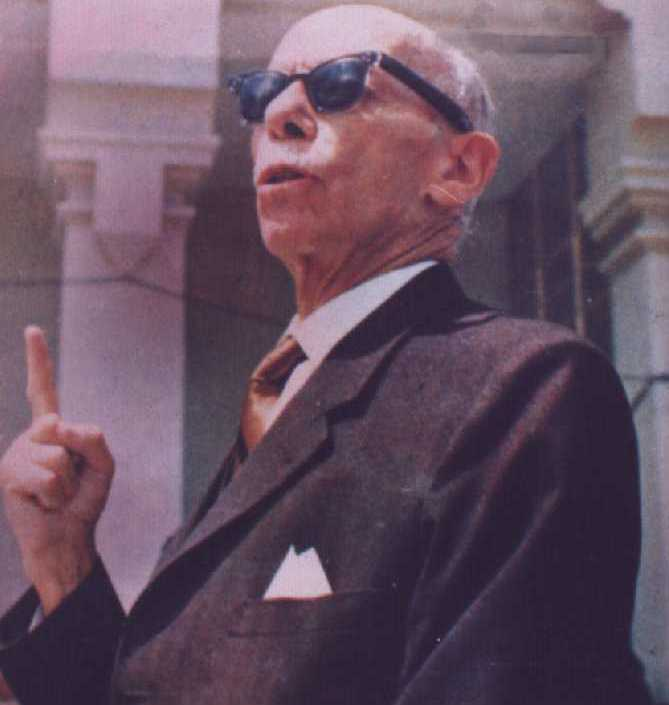
The construction of the Litoral Penitentiary was initiated by President José María Velasco Ibarra.

In 1954, in Guayaquil, President José María Velasco Ibarra decided to undertake the construction of the most ambitious prison project in the country to date, thanks to the income obtained from the collection of export tax. To do this, he asked the Argentine Roberto Pettinato for advice, who had been in charge of the National Directorate of Penal Institutes of Argentina for seven years and who received permission from President Juan Perón to travel to Ecuador and help with the project. The original budget for the work amounted to 17 million sucres and a credit of three million U.S. dollars.

Pettinato arrived in Ecuador on 23 May 1954 and, after giving a series of conferences, began to work on the plans for the penitentiary in conjunction with the Guayas Provincial Council. According to Pettinato's statements to the press, the new prison would focus on rehabilitating inmates and not punishing them, so it would have football and basketball fields, as well as cells with natural light and a school with an auditorium. The final location of the jail was chosen because it was far enough from the city (16 km (9.9 mi) apart at that time) and because it had fertile land suitable for cultivation and quick access to the Daule River.

The Litoral Penitentiary was inaugurated in 1958, with a capacity for 1,500 inmates. At the time of its opening, it was considered the most modern prison in Latin America.

In December 2013, President Rafael Correa began a process of partial demolition and reconstruction of the penitentiary, with ten new pavilions that were inaugurated in 2015 and added to two that were not demolished. The inmates who were in the demolished pavilions were transferred to the recently inaugurated Guayas Regional Rehabilitation Center, located a short distance from the penitentiary.

=== Notable incidents ===
On 28 September 2021, the prison was the scene of the September 2021 Guayaquil prison riot, a massacre during which 123 inmates were killed as a result of clashes between criminal gangs. Due to the high number of victims, the massacre is considered the bloodiest prison riot in the history of Ecuador. Two months later, the November 2021 Guayaquil prison riot occurred at Litoral Penitentiary on 13 November 2021, with at least 68 prisoners being killed. In 2023, at least twelve died in April, and at least eighteen in July.

On 12 September 2024, María Daniela Icaza, director of Litoral Penitentiary, was killed in a targeted shooting. On November 12, 2024, another prison riot erupted, leaving seventeen people killed and fifteen more injured.

In 2025, at least 600 inmates died from health- and food-related causes, with some estimates placing the toll closer to a thousand. In late 2025, inmates began dying from tuberculosis, which escalated into a full-blown epidemic by early 2026.

== Gangs and cartels ==
According to the National Police of Ecuador, by October 2021 the twelve pavilions of the Litoral Penitentiary were controlled by criminal gangs, in the following order:

- Los Choneros: control pavilion 3, 5, 6, 7 and 12.
- Latin Kings: control pavilion 1, 4 and 11.
- Los Chone Killers: control pavilion 2.
- Los Tiguerones: control pavilion 8.
- Los Lobos: control pavilion 9.
