= Los Tiguerones =

Ecuadorian crime syndicate

- Founded: 2020
- Territory: Esmeraldas, Ecuador
- Membership: Nueva Generación
- Activities: Narcotrafficking, assassinations, extortion, human trafficking, money laundering, murder, assault, arms trafficking, kidnapping
- Allies: Los Chone Killers, Los Lobos, Jalisco New Generation Cartel, Kompania Bello
- Rivals: Los Choneros

Los Tiguerones are an Ecuadorian crime syndicate that specializes in drug trafficking activities, assassinations, and other crimes. The group split from Los Choneros in 2020, along with Los Lobos and Los Chone Killers following the murder of Los Choneros leader Jorge Luis Zambrano. The group is based in Esmeraldas.

== History ==
When Los Choneros leader Zambrano was killed in 2020, Los Chone Killers and several other gangs split off due to disagreements with the leadership of José Adolfo Macías Villamar. Clashes and massacres in prisons across Ecuador broke out in the wake of the split.

In 2021, Los Tiguerones, along with other gangs formerly allied to Los Choneros, including Los Chone Killers, Los Pipos, and Los Lobos, announced the creation of an alliance dubbed Nueva Generación after an alliance with Jalisco New Generation Cartel.

On 28 September 2021, a dispute between Los Lobos and Los Choneros in the Litoral Penitentiary, Guayaquil, led to a riot that killed 123 inmates and injured over 80, becoming the deadliest prison riot in Ecuador's history. In that riot, members of the Los Tiguerones gang attacked inmates in pavilions 1 and 3 and beheaded five of them. Los Chone Killers and Tiguerones killed sixty-eight inmates in November 2021 at a prison riot in Litoral Penitentiary.

In September 2026 it was listed as a foreign terrorist organization by the U.S Department of State.

== See also ==
- Tren de Aragua
