= Robert Murphy =

Robert, Rob, Bob or Bobby Murphy may refer to:

== Sports ==
=== Baseball ===
- Bob Murphy (pitcher) (1866–1904), American baseball pitcher
- Bob Murphy (sportscaster) (1924–2004), American sports announcer
- Rob Murphy (born 1960), American retired baseball player

=== Ice hockey ===
- Ron Murphy (Robert Ronald Murphy, 1933–2014), Canadian ice hockey player
- Bob Murphy (ice hockey) (born 1951), Canadian retired professional ice hockey player
- Rob Murphy (ice hockey) (born 1969), Canadian retired ice hockey player

=== Other sports ===
- Bobby Murphy (soccer) (born 1969), soccer coach
- Robert M. Murphy (died 1925), American football administrator
- Irish Bob Murphy (1922–1961), American light heavyweight boxer
- Bob Murphy (golfer) (born 1943), American PGA winning golfer
- Bob Murphy (rower) (born 1950), New Zealand representative rower
- Rob Murphy (basketball) (born 1973), American basketball executive and former coach
- Rob Murphy (gridiron football) (born 1977), American former professional gridiron football player
- Bob Murphy (footballer) (born 1982), Australian rules footballer with the Western Bulldogs

== Politics ==
- Robert S. Murphy (1861–1912), American politician, lieutenant governor of Pennsylvania, 1907–1911
- Robert Murphy (Australian politician) (1876–1966)
- Robert Daniel Murphy (1894–1978), American diplomat
- Robert F. Murphy (politician) (1899–1976), American Democratic politician, lieutenant governor of Massachusetts, 1957–1961

== Others ==
- Bobby Murphy (born 1988), American billionaire co-founder of Snapchat
- Bob Murphy (jazz musician) (1945–2015), Canadian jazz pianist
- Bob Murphy (country rock musician) (died 2021), Canadian rock and country musician
- Robert C. Murphy (judge) (1926–2000), American lawyer and judge
- Robert Cushman Murphy (1887–1973), American ornithologist
- Robert F. Murphy (anthropologist) (1924–1990), American anthropologist
- Robert F. Murphy (computational biologist), professor of computational biology at Carnegie Mellon University
- Bob Murphy (economist) (born 1976), American Austrian School economist and libertarian
- Robert Murphy (mathematician) (1806–1843), Irish mathematician
- Robert C. Murphy (colonel) (c. 1827–1888), American colonel in the Union Army during the American Civil War
- Robert L. Murphy (born 1950), American infectious disease physician and professor of medicine
- Robert Murphy (born 1970), American cinematographer, see In Search of a Midnight Kiss and Meet Me in Montenegro
- Robert Murphy, British TV writer and producer, see Murder City, DCI Banks or Losing Gemma
- Robert William Murphy (1902–1971), American author, Saturday Evening Post, winner of the Dutton Animal Book Award
