= Patricio Mendoza =

Ecuadorian politician (1964–2020)

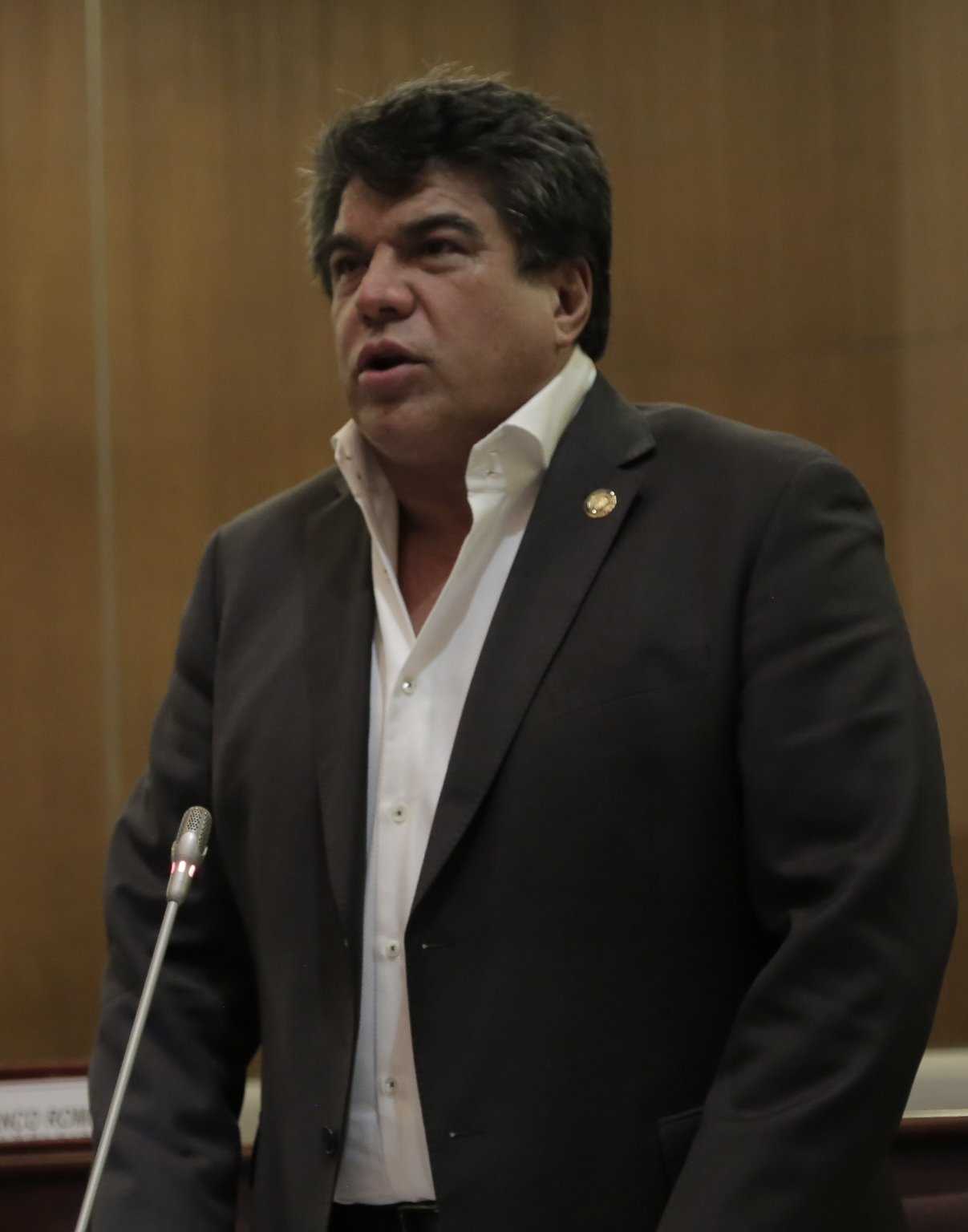

Member of the National Assembly
- In office 14 May 2017 – 18 December 2018

Member of the National Congress
- In office 5 January 2007 – 30 November 2007

Personal details
- Born: 18 January 1964 Santo Domingo, Santo Domingo de los Tsáchilas, Ecuador
- Died: 21 December 2020 (aged 56) Quevado, Los Ríos, Ecuador
- Party: Independent
- Occupation: Politician

Joffre Patricio Mendoza Palma (18 January 1964 – 21 December 2020), also called as Cholo Mendoza, was an Ecuadorian agronomist and politician. Among the public positions he held were deputy and national assemblyman, as well as mayor of the Buena Fe Canton for two consecutive terms.

In 2003, he was accused of having been allegedly related to the murder of political leader Jorge Mogrovejo, who had denounced Mendoza for irregularities in his municipal management.

== Political career ==
=== Mayor of Buena Fe ===
During his time as mayor of Buena Fe, Mendoza received various accusations for alleged acts of corruption and illicit enrichment. The accusations were made by a group of citizens led by Jorge Mogrovejo Velasco, leader of the Democratic People's Movement, who filed complaints against Mendoza with the State Comptroller General, the Internal Revenue Service and the Commission for Civic Control of Corruption in which it emphasized how Mendoza, who came from a middle-class family and had a small personal wealth at the time he began his term as mayor, had become the owner of haciendas in the provinces of Los Ríos, Pichincha and Esmeraldas; mansions in Buena Fe, Salinas and Miami; and several luxury vehicles, one of them valued at US$150,000.

Several of the denouncers received death threats and two of them suffered a failed attack in June 2003 when unknown persons shot at a vehicle in which they were moving. A group of inspectors from the Comptroller's Office arrived at the municipality in mid-August to begin an audit of Mendoza's management, but the mayor prevented them from carrying out the evaluation. On 26 August 2003, Mogrovejo was murdered by unknown persons who fired seven shots at him while he was going to his home. Mogrovejo's wife held Mendoza responsible for the attack and recounted the death threats that both Mogrovejo and his relatives had received after initiating the allegations of corruption. Mendoza categorically denied the allegations.

The Commission for Civic Control of Corruption found indications of criminal responsibility against Mendoza for illicit enrichment, but the case was filed.

=== National Congressman and Deputy ===
In the 2006 legislative elections, Mendoza was elected national deputy representing the Los Ríos Province by the Ecuadorian Roldosista Party, but he was dismissed from office along with the rest of the National Congress in November of the following year when the Ecuadorian Constituent Assembly commenced.

In 2017, Mendoza was elected national assemblyman representing Los Ríos by the alliance between the CREO and SUMA movements. At the end of 2018 he resigned from office to run as a candidate for mayor of Los Ríos in the 2019 sectional elections, but lost to Johnny Terán, whom Mendoza accused of having committed electoral fraud.

Shortly before his death, Mendoza registered as a candidate for assembly in the 2021 legislative elections for the Avanza party. In December 2020, he filed a complaint against Terán for allegedly misusing prefectural assets to promote the campaign his son's election to the National Assembly, for which he presented videos, audio recordings and photographs as evidence.

== Death ==
On the night of 21 December 2020, Mendoza was intercepted on the Quevedo-Valencia highway by individuals who were riding a motorcycle and who shot him repeatedly. Mendoza had just left the offices of a media outlet where he had been interviewed at the time of the attack. Minutes later he was transferred to a medical center, where he was confirmed dead.

Days after the murder, Mendoza's brother asserted that the crime had allegedly occurred for political reasons.
