= Crime in Ecuador =

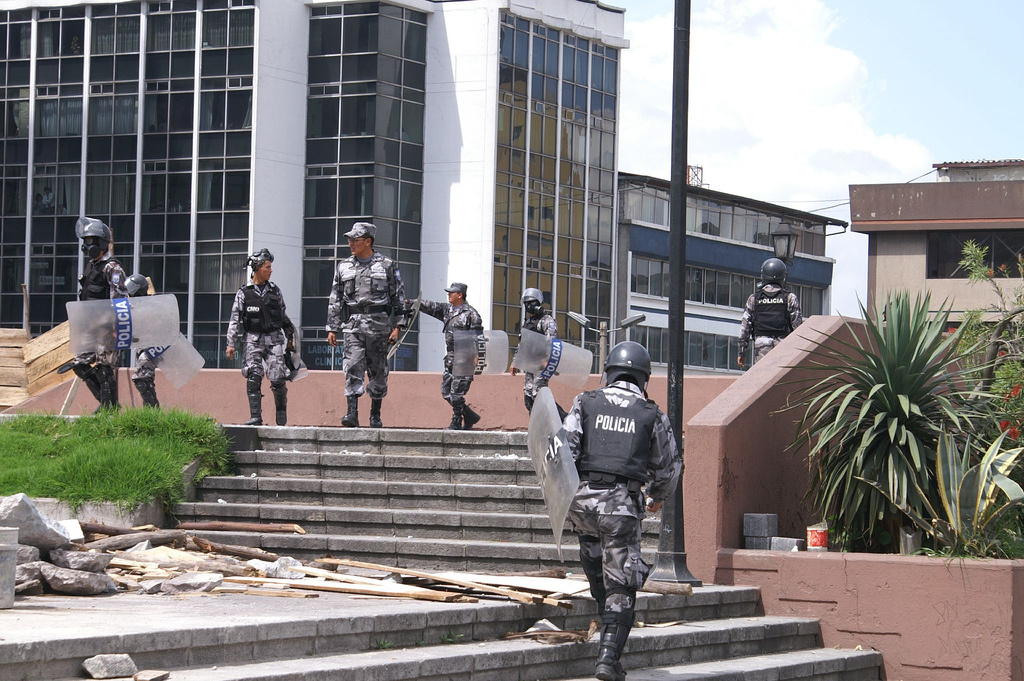
Members of the Ecuadorian National Police after a riot in the capital Quito.

Crime in Ecuador is investigated by the National Police of Ecuador. Until the mid-2010s, Ecuador had one of the lowest crime rates in South America. As of 2020, however, crime rates in the country have seen a sharp increase as a result of the nationwide security crisis.

== Crime by type ==
=== Murder ===
In 2012, Ecuador had a murder rate of 12.4 per 100,000 population. There were a total of 1,924 murders in Ecuador in 2012. By 2014, this had decreased to 8.23 per 100,000, with 1,309 murders recorded that year, but since 2019 the number of homicides, often related to organized crime and narcotraffic operations, has risen to 14 per 100,000 in 2021 while widespread corruption throughout ineffective and weak political institutions provided only a weak answer to the mounting violence. In April 2022, the provinces of Guayas, Manabi, and Esmeraldas were all declared in state of emergencies for 60 days by Ecuadorean President Guillermo Lasso. It was reported that there is a rise in violent deaths and crimes in the said provinces this year. Along with this, 9,000 police and military are said to patrol the streets in the provinces during the 60 days.

=== Corruption ===
In a 2009 diplomatic cable from the United States diplomatic cables leak released in April 2011, U.S. Ambassador Heather Hodges said that "corruption among Ecuadorian National Police officers is widespread and well-known" and that "U.S. investors are reluctant to risk their resources in Ecuador knowing that they could be targeted by corrupt law enforcement officials."

=== Terrorism ===
Domestic terrorist groups present in Ecuador include the Popular Combatants Group (PCG), the Revolutionary Militia of the People, the Marxist-Leninist Party of Ecuador, and the Alfarista Liberation Army. Foreign groups include the Colombian groups Revolutionary Armed Forces of Colombia (FARC) and National Liberation Army (ELN).

=== Domestic violence ===
Although prohibited by law, domestic violence in Ecuador is a human rights problem. In a 2008 survey, 32.4% of the women interviewed aged 15–49 said they had suffered physical or sexual violence by a current or former partner.

=== Security crisis ===
Conflict in Ecuador among rival drug trafficking gangs and the Ecuadorian government has been common. Initially taking place within prisons between rival gangs, it has since expanded outside of prisons and attracted the participation of numerous outside criminal syndicates.

== See also ==
- Assassination of Fernando Villavicencio
- February 2021 Ecuadorian prison riots
