= José Adolfo Macías Villamar =

Ecuadorian criminal (born 1979)

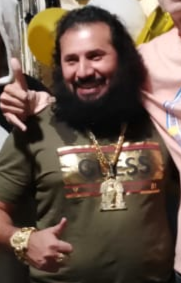
- Macias in 2023
- Born: 30 September 1979 (age 47); Manta, Ecuador
- Other name: Fito
- Occupation: Drug trafficker • Former leader of the Los Choneros cartel
- Known for: Initiating the 2024 conflict in Ecuador

José Adolfo Macías Villamar (born 30 September 1979), also known by the alias Fito, is an Ecuadorian drug lord and the most recent leader of Los Choneros gang. He assumed leadership in 2020 following the murder of his predecessor Jorge Luis Zambrano. Since then the gang is accused of turning Ecuador from "a tourist haven to a country with one of the highest murder rates in the region". He had been incarcerated since 2011, having previously escaped prison and lived as a fugitive in 2013. In January 2024, he escaped from prison again, prompting a state of emergency to be called in Ecuador for sixty days and initiating the 2024 conflict in Ecuador. He was captured on 25 June 2025 and was extradited to the United States on 20 July 2025.

== Criminal career ==
He was first arrested in 2000 for committing robbery.

In 2011, he was arrested for drug trafficking and organized crime and was imprisoned in La Roca Prison. On 11 February 2013, he escaped along with 17 other members of Los Choneros. To carry out the escape, they immobilized fourteen prison guards and fled by boats on the Daule River. In May 2013, they were recaptured while at their own residence.

When Jorge Luis Zambrano, the previous leader of Los Choneros, was murdered in December 2020, Macías and Junior Roldán became the successors to the criminal syndicate. Three years later, Roldán was murdered. Leaving Macías as the sole leader of Los Choneros. When Macías assumed leadership, many accused him of Zambrano's death to gain power in prison. This caused a rupture in Los Choneros, as some claimed Zambrano would never have a successor.

He was serving a sentence of thirty-four years in the Litoral Penitentiary for organized crime, drug trafficking, and murders. He escaped from prison in January 2024, leading the government to declare a state of emergency. In response, criminal gangs launched several attacks against civilians and the police. Before his escape, he exercised "significant internal control of the prison" where he was incarcerated. Fito and Junior Roldán, another leader of 'Los Choneros' who was killed in 2023 in Colombia, had "differentiated and preferential treatment by the authorities".

On 2 April 2025, a New York court indicted José Adolfo Macías Villamar on seven counts of drug trafficking, conspiracy, weapons trafficking, and illegal distribution of drugs in the United States. On 26 June 2025, it was reported he was caught in an underground bunker in the city of Manta. On 11 July 2025, he agreed to be extradited to the United States and was sent there on 20 July. On 21 July 2025, Macías made his first appearance in a Brooklyn federal court, where he entered a plea of not guilty.

=== Kidnapping of his daughter ===
On 17 November 2021, Macías's daughter was allegedly kidnapped along with her cousin. Later, on November 21, she was released and reported that the kidnapper did not harm or abuse them. It was revealed that the young women were kidnapped in the El Aromo area.

== Assassination of presidential candidate Fernando Villavicencio ==
Macías is the leading suspect and mastermind behind the assassination of Fernando Villavicencio. Several weeks before the assassination Villavicencio mentioned threats he got from Los Choneros, if he keeps talking about them in his campaign. It is claimed Fito ordered the assassination from prison and on 9 August 2023 he was assassinated. The killers were part of Los Lobos that is related to Los Choneros.

== See also ==
- Ecuadorian security crisis
- Crime in Ecuador
