= La Empresa =

Mexican cartel and drug trafficking gang

The Enterprise
- La Empresa
- Founded: Late 2010s
- Founder: Gerardo Santana Garza a.k.a "300"
- Founding location: Mexico
- Years active: Late 2010s–present
- Territory: Ciudad Juarez
- Ethnicity: Mexican, Latin American
- Leaders: Gerardo Santana Garza, Omar "The Gnome" Alejandro
- Activities: Drug trafficking, kidnapping, theft
- Allies: Juárez Cartel, La Linea, Barrio Azteca
- Rivals: Sinaloa Cartel

La Empresa, The New Company or The Enterprise (Spanish: La empresa, La Nueva Empresa) is a Mexican cartel and a drug trafficking gang that is mainly based in Chihuahua. La Empresa is a breakaway from Barrio Azteca. The cartel was founded by Gerardo Santana Garza (also known as "300") and Luis “El Tio” Mendez, Garza's brother Omar "The Gnome" Alejandro was also a major figure and member in the cartel. The origins of this cartel are alleged to be a breakaways from the Juárez Cartel, many of the Juárez Cartel members became adversaries of the cartel and from 1998 the cartel became very unstable. In 1999 many members broke from the cartel and formed their own gangs. During the early 2000s, the Juarez members and drug lords from contiguous Mexican states forged an alliance that became known as 'The Golden Triangle Alliance' or 'La Alianza Triángulo de Oro' because of its three-state area of influence: Chihuahua, south of the U.S. state of Texas, Durango and Sinaloa, a few other gangs formed along with the alliance. La Empresa formed during this time and was one of the gangs.

The Enterprise cartel mostly operates as a drug trafficking cartel, the enterprise has a history of trafficking cocaine, heroin, MDMA, fentanyl, marijuana.
