= September 2021 Guayaquil prison riot =

Prison riot in Ecuador

- Date: 28 September 2021
- Venue: Litoral Penitentiary
- Location: Guayaquil; 02°03′09″S 79°56′42″W
- Type: Riot
- Cause: Gang rivalry
- Motive: To gain criminal leadership
- Participants: Prison inmates
- Deaths: 123 inmates

The September 2021 Guayaquil prison riot occurred at the Litoral Penitentiary in Guayaquil, Ecuador on 28 September 2021. At least 123 inmates were killed and several others were injured in the riot that took place in that prison. It was the deadliest prison fight in the country's history and one of the deadliest in Latin American history.

== Background ==
The confrontations between the criminal gangs began after the death of Jorge Luis Zambrano, leader of the Los Choneros gang, one of the largest and oldest criminal organizations in the country. Zambrano was assassinated on 28 December 2020 and as a result of the incident, several groups that were previously part of the gang split off and began to attack their former leaders. These groups would become Los Chone Killers, Los Lobos, Los Pipos and Los Tiguerones.

According to the news portal Primicias, on 24 September, during a birthday party held for a gang leader known as “Junior”, members of Los Choneros allegedly stated that they were the most powerful gang within the prison. This heightened tensions between them and rival gangs, especially Los Lobos and Los Tiguerones, which would start the riot four days later.

== Riot ==
The clashes between the gangs began around 9:30 in the morning of 28 September, when the first detonations of explosives were heard inside the jail and the authorities decided to evacuate the administrative personnel working there. Inmates from pavilions 8 and 9 entered pavilion 5 and attacked their rivals, resulting in around 35 deaths and 48 injuries. Members of the Los Tiguerones gang also attacked inmates in pavilions 1 and 3 and beheaded five of them.

As a consequence of the first confrontation that occurred in the morning, another retaliatory attack took place.

== Response ==
On September 30, around 900 police and military personnel entered the Litoral Penitentiary to pacify the prison, in response to President Guillermo Lasso's announcement the day before that some pavilions still did not have a police presence. During the entry, the security forces found improvised checkpoints built by the inmates and holes in several walls used by the attackers to enter other pavilions in search of victims.

At least five of the dead were found to have been beheaded, officials said.

In the wake of the clashes on 28 September, Ecuador plans to pardon up to 2,000 inmates.

Lasso declared a state of emergency. He has been trying to control the prison system, with the prison violence completely in the hands of criminal gangs. The state has lost control and now has a state of emergency.

=== November 2021 riots at Litoral Penitentiary ===
Another riot occurred at Litoral Penitentiary on 13 November 2021. Reuters and Swissinfo reported 68 prisoners were killed and over a dozen were seriously injured during this riot.

== See also ==
- Prison riot
- Prison gang
- February 2021 Ecuadorian prison riots
- November 2021 Guayaquil prison riot
- Illegal drug trade in Latin America
