= Los Chone Killers =

Criminal organization in Ecuador

- Founded: 2020
- Territory: Durán, Ecuador
- Membership: 2,000
- Leaders: Antonio Benjamín Camacho "Ben 10", Terry Israel Camacho "Trompudo"
- Activities: Narcotrafficking, assassinations, extortion, human trafficking, money laundering, murder, assault, arms trafficking, kidnapping
- Allies: Los Tiguerones, Los Lobos, Jalisco New Generation Cartel
- Rivals: Los Choneros, Latin Kings, Los Lagartos (on occasion)

Los Chone Killers, or Chone Killers, are an Ecuadorian criminal and terrorist organization known for their drug trafficking activities, assassinations, and other crimes. The group split from Los Choneros in 2020, along with Los Lobos and Los Tiguerones following the murder of Los Choneros leader Jorge Luis Zambrano. The group mainly operates in Guayas Province, in particular the city of Durán.

== History ==
Los Chone Killers are derived from the Puerto Rican drug trafficking gang Ñetas after the latter's international expansion. When Los Choneros leader Zambrano was killed in 2020, Los Chone Killers and several other gangs split off due to disagreements with the leadership of José Adolfo Macías Villamar. Clashes and massacres in prisons across Ecuador broke out in the wake of the split. When Los Chone Killers emerged, they were unpopular in Durán.

In 2021, Los Chone Killers, along with other gangs formerly allied to Los Choneros, including Los Pipos, Los Lobos and Tiguerones, announced the creation of an alliance dubbed Nueva Generación after an alliance with Jalisco New Generation Cartel.

Los Chone Killers gained international notoriety following the murder of Leandro Norero, alias "El Jefe", the financier of the gang. The Ecuadorian government warned of reprisal attacks by Los Chone Killers in Litoral Penitentiary, and decided to transfer Los Chone Killers prisoners to other prisons to prevent clashes. Instead, clashes broke out against prison guards and Ecuadorian police by Los Chone Killers across Ecuador.

In May 2024, Panamanian authorities managed to capture Julio Alberto Martínez Alcívar, alias "Negro Tulio", a high-value target and ringleader of the Chone Killers criminal group, wanted in Ecuador for terrorism and identified as the alleged mastermind of the murder of an anti-corruption prosecutor. The Panamanian National Police reported his arrest on Thursday, May 30.

Since 2023, Los Chone Killers have been in a territorial dispute with Latin Kings in Durán. In 2026, it was designated as a terrorist organization by the United States.
