= February 2021 Ecuadorian prison riots =

Massacre in Ecuadorian prisons in February 2021

2021 Ecuador prison riots
- Date: 23 February 2021
- Location: Cuenca, Guayaquil, and Latacunga
- Type: Prison riots
- Cause: Gang rivalry
- Participants: Prison inmates
- Deaths: 79 inmates

On 23 February 2021, 79 inmates were killed and several others were injured in riots that took place simultaneously in four Ecuadorian prisons. Authorities have cited gang rivalry in an overcrowded prison system as the cause. The violence happened in prisons located in the Guayas, Azuay, and Cotopaxi provinces, which contain nearly 70% of the total prison population in the country.

== Background ==
According to officials, the riot began as several rival prison gangs were fighting for leadership and they clashed inside detention centers around the country. Authorities claim that the fight for leadership began back in December when Jorge Luis Zambrano "Rasquiña", leader of Los Choneros, the most powerful gang within Ecuadorian prisons, was murdered in a shopping mall in Manta, Ecuador, a few months after being released. The riots are reported to have been precipitated by a weapon search carried out on the day prior to the riots, where two firearms were seized from members of Los Choneros. The police believe that these firearms were going to be used to kill the leaders of the other four prison gangs that had formed an alliance against Los Choneros. News of the firearms seizure alerted rival gang members and they promptly organized and launched a coordinated attack against the leaders of Los Choneros in four different prisons.

== Casualties ==
Early reports confirmed that at least 50 inmates were killed following the violence. 800 police officers were required to quell the violence. Some photographs and videos were spread on social media which showed the inmates decapitated and dismembered in pools of blood. On February 24, the death toll of the inmates increased to 79.

== Response ==
Ecuadorian President Lenin Moreno declared a temporary state of emergency in the prison system, in order to control the prison violence.

In the wake of the clashes on 28 September, Ecuador planned to pardon up to 2,000 inmates.

=== November 2021 riots at Penitenciaria del Litoral ===
Riots on 13 November 2021 at Penitenciaria del Litoral, on the outskirts of Guayaquil, led to at least 68 deaths and 24 injured.

== See also ==
- Los Lobos (gang)
