= National Police of Ecuador =

National Police of Ecuador Policía Nacional del Ecuador
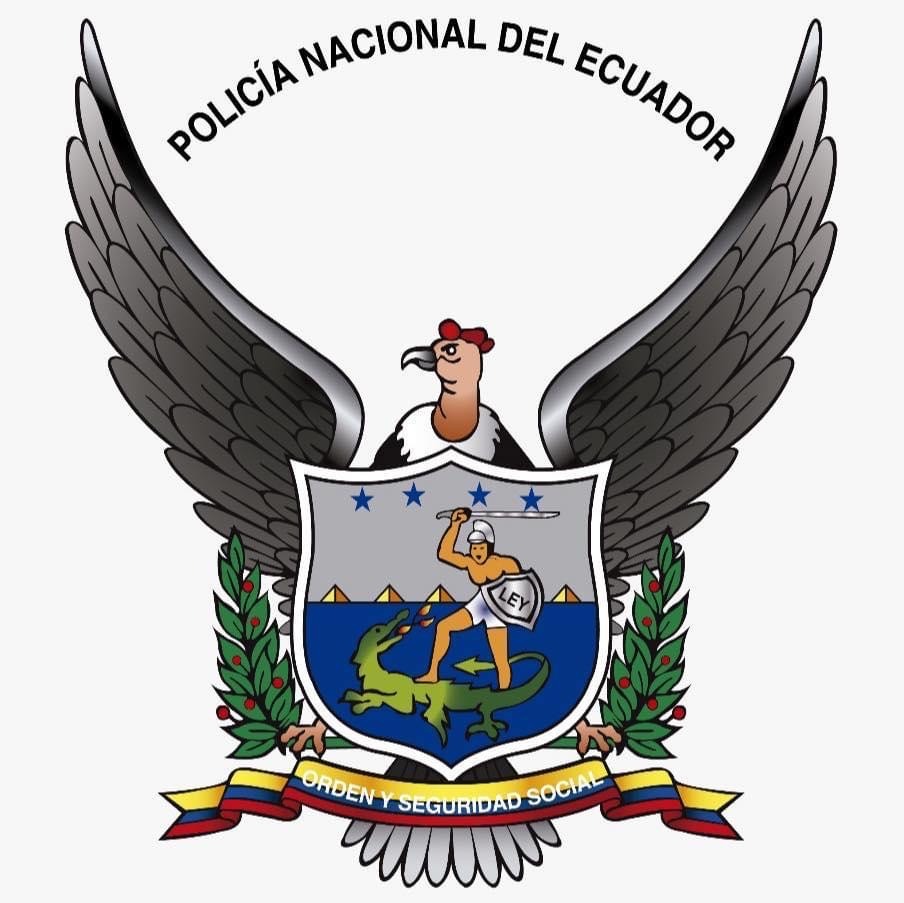

Agency overview
- Formed: 14 July, 1884; 142 years ago
- Employees: 46,727 (2021)

Jurisdictional structure
- National agency: Ecuador
- Operations jurisdiction: Ecuador
- General nature: Civilian police

Operational structure
- Agency executive: Tannya Gioconda Varela Coronel, General Commander

Website
- https://www.policia.gob.ec/

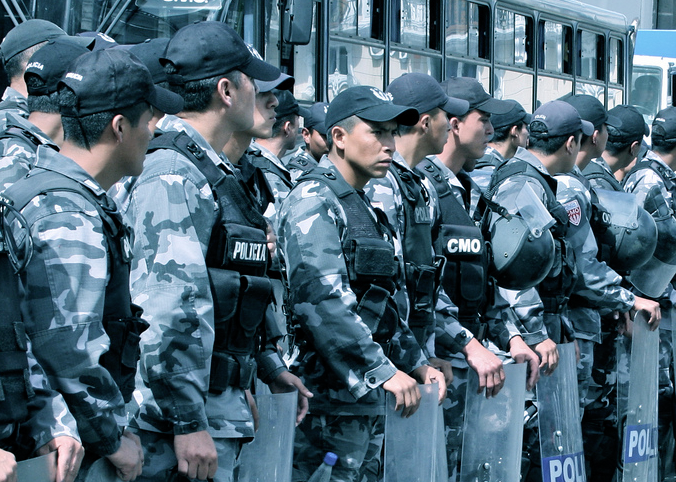
Police at the Mariscal Sucre International Airport in the capital Quito

The National Police of Ecuador (Spanish: Policía Nacional del Ecuador) is the national police force and the main civil law enforcement agency of Ecuador. It is commanded by the Commanding General (Comandante General) and subordinate to the Ministry of the Interior.

== Controversies ==
=== Human rights ===
The United States Country Reports on Human Rights Practices has consistently identified major human rights abuses by Ecuadorian security forces, including: isolated unlawful killings and use of excessive force by security forces, sometimes with impunity, poor prison conditions, arbitrary arrest and detention, corruption and other abuses by security forces, a high number of pretrial detainees, and corruption and denial of due process within the judicial system. Members of the National Police have been accused of murder, attempted murder, rape, extortion, kidnappings, and alien smuggling.

=== Corruption ===
In a 2009 diplomatic cable from the United States diplomatic cables leak in April 2011, U.S. Ambassador Heather Hodges said that "corruption among Ecuadorian National Police officers is widespread and well-known" and that "U.S. investors are reluctant to risk their resources in Ecuador knowing that they could be targeted by corrupt law enforcement officials." The leaked cable resulted in a major diplomatic spat, resulting in the expulsion of U.S. Ambassador Hodges from Ecuador and the reciprocal expulsion of Ecuadorian Ambassador Luis Gallegos from the U.S.

== See also ==
- 2010 Ecuador crisis
- Crime in Ecuador
