= Jorge Luis Zambrano =

Ecuadorian drug trafficker (1981–2020)

- Born: Jorge Luis Zambrano González; 3 October 1981; Manta, Ecuador
- Died: 28 December 2020 (aged 39); Manta, Ecuador
- Cause of death: Gunshot wound
- Other name: Rasquiña
- Occupation: Drug trafficker
- Allegiance: Los Choneros

Jorge Luis Zambrano González (3 October 1981 – 28 December 2020), also known by the alias Rasquiña, was an Ecuadorian drug trafficker. He was the leader of Los Choneros from 2007 until his murder in 2020.

== Early life ==
Zambrano was born on 3 October 1981 in Manta, Ecuador.

== Criminal career ==
Zambrano became the leader of Los Choneros after the murder of their founder, Jorge Véliz alias "Teniente España". In 2008, he was arrested for the first time by the police in an anti-narcotics operation, but he was released a year later as he had not received a sentence. In September 2011, he was captured again by the police, this time in Guayaquil for his participation in the murder of a man in the Manabí Province. According to the police, Zambrano was involved in at least 14 murders. In 2012, he was accused of murder again, this time of another inmate who was held in the same prison as him.

On February 11, 2013, Zambrano escaped with 17 other members of Los Choneros from La Roca Prison, in Guayaquil. To carry out the escape, they immobilized 14 prison guards and escaped by boat on the Daule River. The Minister of the Interior, José Serrano, announced a reward of 100,000 US dollars for the capture of Zambrano. Nine months later he was detained in an exclusive sector of the city of Bogotá by the Colombian police and extradited back to Ecuador. He was then taken to the Zone 8 Deprivation of Liberty Center, considered at that time the safest prison in the country.

In 2015, Zambrano was sentenced as an accessory to murder to an eight-year sentence, but two years later he was declared a co-author of the crime and the sentence was increased to twenty years. However, in 2019 a judge changed the sentence again, this time to seven years. During his stay in prison he continued to manage the organization's criminal operations. In 2019, he was accused of having been involved in the entry of a fake ambulance into the Guayaquil prison, the same one that was transporting a refrigerator, firearms and bottles of liquor. However, months later he was separated from the process due to lack of proof.

In June 2020, Zambrano was released from the Cotopaxi Social Rehabilitation Center after Judge Alzira Benítez accepted his request to access pre-release for having served more than 90% of his sentence, a fact for which the Judiciary Council initiated a disciplinary summary against Judge Benítez. He began a dispute for control of Los Choneros with two other members of the organization. A month after his release, the Universidad Técnica Particular de Loja granted him the title of lawyer, which Zambrano obtained through distance learning during his stay in prison.

== Death ==
On 28 December 2020, Zambrano was murdered in a cafeteria in a shopping center in Manta by an unknown person who shot him at point-blank range. He had gone to the scene in the company of his wife and his daughter, as well as personnel who offered him protection, but his attacker took advantage of the moment when his companions withdrew to intercept him. The incident caused the evacuation of the shopping center. A day after the incident, the police announced that they were investigating a possible relationship between the murder of Zambrano and that of politician Patricio Mendoza, which occurred days before in the city of Quevedo.
