= Los Lobos (gang) =

Crime group in Ecuador

- Founded: 2020; 6 years ago
- Founders: Wilmer Chavarría
- Founding location: Ecuador
- Years active: Since 2020
- Territory: Guayas, El Oro, Cuenca, Riobamba
- Ethnicity: Ecuadorian
- Membership: 8,000+
- Leaders: Wilmer Chavarría (until 2021); Fabricio Colón Pico (until 2024); Alexander Quesada
- Allies: Jalisco New Generation Cartel; Los Tiguerones; Los Chone Killers; Kompania Bello; FARC 48th Front; Tren de Aragua
- Rivals: Los Choneros

Los Lobos (English: The Wolves) is an Ecuadorian criminal and terrorist organization that specializes in drug trafficking and working as hitmen for international partners or allied groups. Los Lobos began as a splinter group of the Los Choneros drug cartel, but broke away in 2020 after the death of Jorge Luis Zambrano, along with Los Chone Killers and Los Tiguerones. The group has over 8,000 members and mainly operates in cities of Latacunga, Cuenca, and Machala, and also in the province of Pastaza. Los Lobos participates in exporting cocaine from Ecuador.

== History ==
Los Lobos began as a splinter group of the Los Choneros drug cartel. After the assassination of Jorge Luis Zambrano, the gang's leader, in 2020, a vacuum was left in the organization's leadership. Due to their weakened position, several gangs, including Los Lobos, broke away and formed a new alliance to combat them. They referred to themselves as the Nueva Generación.

Members of Los Lobos were involved in several prison riots across Ecuador. On 28 September 2021, a dispute between Los Lobos and Los Choneros in the Litoral Penitentiary, Guayaquil, led to a riot that killed 123 inmates and injured over 80. It was the deadliest prison riot in Ecuador's history. On 4 April 2022, riots broke out in Turi prison, Cuenca which killed at least 20 inmates. Alexander Quesada, the leader of Los Lobos, and Marcelo Anchundia, the leader of rival gang R7, were reportedly behind the riot. On 9 May 2022, at least 44 inmates were killed and over 100 managed to escape after a riot in Bellavista prison, Santo Domingo. The riot was fought between members of Los Lobos and R7 in an attempt to kill Anchundia, who had been transferred to the prison along with Quesada.

In November 2022, Los Lobos, along with their ally Los Tiguerones, were behind a wave of violence across Ecuador after many of their members were transferred out of the Litoral Penitentiary, which they feared would result in a loss of control over the prison. During the wave of violence, two headless bodies were found hanging from a bridge, inmates took eight guards hostage, nine car bombs were set off in the provinces of Esmeraldas and Guayas, and five police officers were shot dead.

On 9 August 2023, masked men claiming to be members of Los Lobos claimed responsibility for the assassination of Fernando Villavicencio in a video. In a second video, other men purporting to be members of Los Lobos denied playing a role in the assassination and said that they were being framed. An investigation found that the order to kill Villavicencio came from inside a prison. An inmate imprisoned in the Latacunga jail who had sent messages to one of the gunmen and a woman who was accused by prosecutors of providing the assailants with logistical support were both allegedly members of the gang.

In 2025, the United States designated the Los Lobos and Los Choneros gangs as foreign terrorist organizations. On 16 November, Los Lobos leader Wilmer "Pipo" Chavarria, who faked his death in 2021, was arrested in Málaga, Spain.

In March 2026, Ángel Esteban Aguilar Morales aka Lobo Menor, a suspected leader of Los Lobos accused of involvement in the Villavicencio assassination, was arrested in Mexico and extradited to Colombia, where he is also wanted on charges of involvement with FARC dissidents.
