= Los Choneros =

Ecuadorian criminal organization

The Choneros
- Los Choneros
- Founded: 2005; 21 years ago
- Founded by: Jorge Bismark Véliz España
- Founding location: Chone, Ecuador
- Years active: 2005−present
- Territory: Manabí, Guayas
- Ethnicity: Ecuadorians
- Membership: 12,000-20,000 (2025)
- Leaders: Jorge Véliz X (2005–2007); Jorge Luis Zambrano X (2007–2020); José Adolfo Macías Villamar (2020-2025, captured and extradited)
- Criminal activities: Drug trafficking; contract killing; extortion, human trafficking, illegal immigration; money laundering; murder; kidnapping; arms trafficking
- Allies: Sinaloa Cartel; Clan del Golfo; Urías Rondón Front; Kompania Bello
- Rivals: Los Lagartos; Los Lobos; Los Tiguerones; Los Chone Killers

Los Choneros (Spanish pronunciation: [los tʃoˈneɾos]) is an organized crime syndicate and terrorist organization from Chone, Manabí Province, Ecuador. The gang is involved in drug trafficking, extortion, and robbery, many crimes being carried out through prisons with the help of corrupt officials. Los Choneros work with criminal groups in Colombia, Peru, and Mexico, to traffic cocaine and other drugs to the United States.

== History ==
The Los Choneros originated in the city of Chone and Manta in the Manabí province of Ecuador in the 1990s. Jorge Bismarck Véliz España, also known as “Teniente España,” was the original leader, and later, leadership was passed to Rasquiña and José Adolfo Macías Villamar, also known as “Fito.” España was killed in a conflict between the Choneros and a rival gang by the name of the Queseros.

Carlos Jesús Cedeño Vera, known alternatively as El Rojo or El Quesero, the head of the Los Queseros gang, had a fight with Bismark at a party and ordered his murder. In the assassination attempt, Bismark and his daughter were wounded, and his wife was killed. Bismark, the Choneros future leader Jorge Luis Zambrano, and a Choneros hitman, murdered Cadeño Vera's brother and son, Jhonny Verdy Cedeño Vera and Cristhian Jonathan Cedeño Briones. In the ensuing war, the Queseros were exterminated. Several members of the Choneros survived, allowing them to continue with their criminal activities.

The Choneros function as the armed wing of the Sinaloa Cartel within Ecuador. Their main business is drug trafficking, especially cocaine. Since 2011, the Choneros have also been present in prisons around the country. The drug cartel is well organized nationwide and holds influence over Ecuadorian security officials and politicians.

On January 9, 2024, an armed conflict in Ecuador broke out after drug lord José Adolfo Macías Villamar escaped from prison. 30 top government officials were arrested by an anti-corruption and anti-drug trafficking operation in connection to Villamar’s orchestrated escape. Ecuador’s government declared an “internal war” against several organized crime groups, most notably the Choneros. Macías was recaptured in Manta on 25 June 2025. On 11 July 2025, Macías agreed to be extradited to the United States. The extradition would then take place on 20 July 2025.

== Criminal activities and operations ==
=== Drug trafficking, extortion, and kidnappings ===
Criminal networks such as the Choneros engage in illicit activities such as drug and human trafficking, and illegal mining. These groups operate at the provincial or city level, with some violently competing for control of the drug trade in Guayaquil.

=== Arms trafficking ===
The rise in illegal arms trafficking has led to a sharp increase in violent deaths, giving Ecuador the highest murder rate in the Americas in 2023. Many of these killings are linked to clashes between organized crime groups. In an attempt to slow the rise of illegal arms trafficking, the Ecuadorian government has loosened gun ownership restrictions, but crime has continued. Decree 707 is responsible for this as it allows for civilians to carry weapons.

=== Influence in prisons and prison riots ===
Rasquina, a notorious leader of the Choneros gang, has been able to take over Ecuadorian prisons through murdering other high profile criminals, creating alliances with other criminals, and recruiting new members to the Los Choneros gang. There is also a presence of murder-for-hire rings with access to high-powered weapons, and prisons have become a breeding ground for the expansion of organized crime.

=== Violence against civilians and law enforcement ===
Criminal groups such as the Choneros have been able to use corruption and violence to insert themselves into Ecuadorian politics, such as the assassinations of political candidates and coercion in order to gain protection from officials and take over government structures.

== Geographic distribution ==
=== Hotspots of gang activity ===
According to Insight Crime, the Choneros gang's historical home is the city of Manta in the Manabí province, giving the group control over a major drug trafficking corridor used to reach Mexico and Central America, allowing for further expansion.

=== Presence in border regions and strategic locations ===
The heightened drug trafficking through Ecuador is based on its proximity to Colombia and Peru, two countries where cocaine is produced.

The Choneros gang’s relationships with mafia groups and cartels in Mexico, Colombia, and Albania, has resulted in Ecuador becoming one of the main sources of cocaine to Europe. This has led to increased homicide rates as the flow of drugs has risen in the country.

The northern border with Colombia presents challenges for law enforcement due to dense jungle terrain. The Putumayo-Caqueta region, known for having the largest coca cultivation area, is heavily impacted by both domestic illegal armed groups and international criminal organizations. Situated between Colombia and Peru—two of the world’s leading cocaine producers—Ecuador has become a key transit point for cocaine trafficking, particularly as the state's control has weakened. Its location and dollarized economy also make Ecuador an attractive destination for drug traffickers and cartels seeking to launder money.

== Government and law enforcement response ==
=== Anti-gang operations and crackdowns ===
After the La Roca jailbreak, the Correa administration attempted to crackdown on gangs, corruption, and overcrowding in prisons by constructing a series of “mega prisons.”

According to James Barget of Insight Crime, soon, over half of the prison population was housed in just four facilities. But the new prisons were poorly built and run, lacking guards, infrastructure, and basic services such as running water and adequate food. For the prisoners and prison officials, it was clear that Correa’s promises that rehabilitation programs would be at the heart of the system existed on paper alone. Corruption ran rampant.”

Ecuador established a witness protection program in 2014 to protect and assist victims and witnesses. However, the program lacks resources and witnesses are protected by police officers rather than military personnel.

=== Military involvement and states of emergency ===
In January 2024, a high-profile leader of the Choneros gang, Rasquina and Adolfo Macias (Fito) escaped from the La Roca prison in the city of Guayaquil, resulting in the country declaring a national emergency due to the “internal armed conflict.” This escape was made possible with the help of other prisoners, and it also was believed to be aided by prison staff. According to James Barnett, “When the police entered La Roca that night, they found 14 guards handcuffed and locked in cells. A fence had been cut several days before, and footprints led to a nearby riverbank where they found a boat containing prison guard uniforms, munitions, and rifle magazines… and authorities would come to believe they did it all with the complicity of guards and police.”.

Since the government's crackdown on gangs after the prison breakout, overall killings have decreased, but the number of kidnappings and extortion crimes have risen, and the security situation in Ecuador remains dire.

According to Human Rights Watch, “The military, which has controlled Ecuador’s prisons since January, has held detainees incommunicado, at times hampering their right to consult with lawyers or to obtain medical assistance. Soldiers appear to be responsible for multiple cases of mistreatment and some cases of torture in prison. At a court hearing, one detainee described guards whipping him on the back with a cable and stepping on his finger. “Since they supposedly couldn’t hit me yesterday because I’m sick, they made me spread my legs and hit me in the testicles.”

=== Judicial and legal measures against gangs ===
In 2011, drug lord Fito was sentenced to 34 years in prison on charges of murder and drug trafficking, but, while in prison, he was given access to his cellphone and the internet, enabling him to continue directing activities of the Choneros gang.

In April 2024, “mano dura” (iron fist) policies and the military’s role in public security were solidified, and the homicide rates fell. However, this strategy allowed for high-value targeting (HVT), which is the process of using military or police force to capture leaders of gangs, which made violence increase and persist in new areas of Ecuador.

=== International cooperation efforts ===
In 2024, the U.S. Department of Treasury of Foreign Assets Control (OFAC) sanctioned the Choneros and its leader Fito to counteract drug trafficking. In 2025, the US government designated the gang as a foreign terrorist organization.

== Social and economic impact ==
=== Effects on local communities ===
Los Choneros have had major impacts on local communities in Ecuador, killing citizens, public officials, journalists, and negatively impacting local businesses. Overall, the effects of gangs have made safety and security of civilians worsen over time.

Juanita Goebertus, Colombian Congresswoman, said “‘The escalation of violence—and the increase in organized crime in Ecuador jeopardize Ecuadorians’ lives and institutions.”

Three mayors and the director of a prison were killed in 2024, and human rights violations by the military in streets and prisons have resulted from government crackdowns on gangs like the Choneros.

In one documented case by Human Rights Watch, soldiers shot 19 year-old Carlos Javier Vega and injured his cousin Eduardo Velasco, in Guayaquil on February 2, 2024. The army claimed that Vega and Velasco had "attempted to evade a control point by ramming into military personnel" and labeled them as "terrorists." However, interviews conducted by Human Rights Watch with witnesses, relatives, and the victims' lawyers, along with verified videos, photographs, and court records, contradict the army's version of events, including its claim that the young men were affiliated with criminal groups.

Journalists have also faced threats in Ecuador due to gang violence. In 2022, journalist Gerardo Delgado was murdered, a crime revealed to have been orchestrated by drug-trafficking groups. In 2023, nine journalists covering public safety were forced into exile from Ecuador due to threats to their lives. In 2024, another journalist left the country for safety reasons.

In the town of Durán, a key cocaine transshipment hub, turf wars between the Chone Killers (a splinter group of Los Choneros) and the Latin Kings have involved car-bombings targeting public officials. In Manabí, government crackdowns on the Choneros led to the emergence of violent splinter factions, including Los Pepes, a coalition of eight smaller gangs. The ongoing conflict among these groups has resulted in widespread violence against civilians.

In territories controlled by the Choneros, Tiguerones, and Lobos, extortion backed by violence imposes financial burdens on businesses, government institutions, and ordinary citizens. Small and medium-sized enterprises often struggle to meet these demands, sometimes leading to their closure. These “vacunas” (payments required to avoid physical harm or property damage) serve not only as a source of profit but also as a means of governance and control.

=== Influence on migration and displacement ===
Ecuador’s crime has repercussions for the United States, strengthening dangerous criminal organizations and increasing migration. During his confirmation hearing, Secretary of State Marco Rubio emphasized Ecuador as a key U.S. priority, particularly in tackling security threats.

=== Youth recruitment and social factors contributing to gang membership ===
Youth are often a target for gang recruiting because their innocence is easy to exploit.

Duran community leader Alexandra Saavedra says “Teenagers are easy prey for drug traffickers… If they don't have places to play sports and live in a depressed place, of course they will join a gang… Sometimes a wolf is not bad out of desire, but because it has no options."

== See also ==
- Tren de Aragua
