= Ecuadorian conflict (2024–present) =

Conflict with organized crime groups

- Part of the Ecuadorian security crisis and the war on cartels
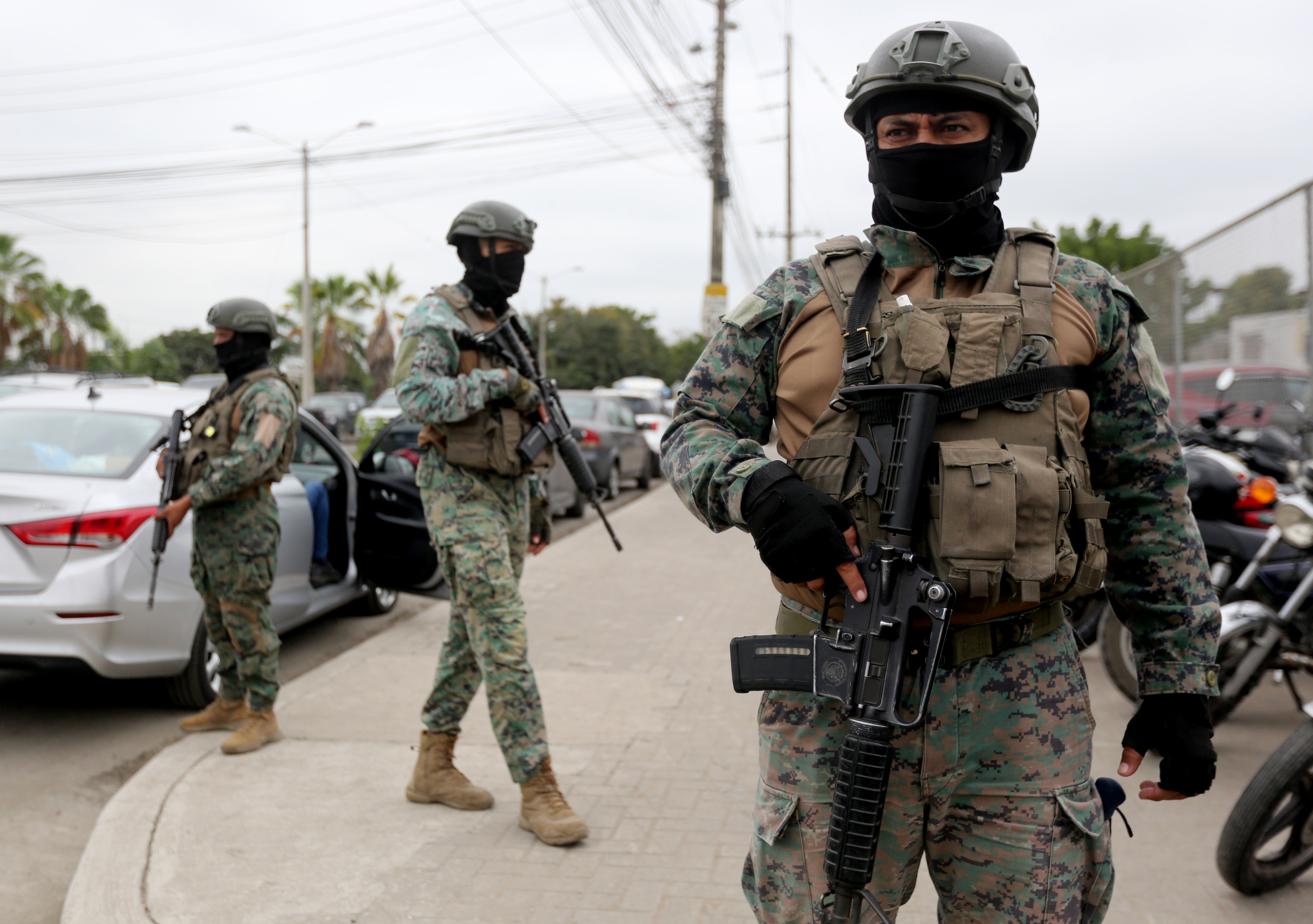
- Ecuadorian Armed Forces after terrorist attacks in Guayaquil, Guayas
Date	9 January 2024 – present (2 years, 9 months, 3 weeks and 6 days)
Location	Ecuador; Most violent cities are Guayaquil and Durán, as well as nearby coastal provinces (Manabí, El Oro, and Los Ríos).
Status	Ongoing

Belligerents
Shield of the Americas; Government of Ecuador; United States (Note: Directly involved on the ground since 3 March 2026)	Organized crime groups, notably Los Choneros; FARC dissidents

Commanders and leaders
Daniel Noboa; Jaime Vela Erazo; Henry Santiago Delgado Salvador; (United States) Donald Trump; (United States) Pete Hegseth	José Adolfo Macías Villamar (POW); Fabricio Colón Pico (POW); Wilmer Chavarría; (POW)

Units involved
(Ecuador) Armed Forces; Ecuadorian Army; Ecuadorian Air Force; National Police; United States Armed Forces; United States Southern Command; Air Forces Southern; Special Operations Command South; 24th Marine Expeditionary Unit; Armed civilians	Several organisations: Águilas; Águilas Killers; AK47; Caballeros Oscuros; Chone Killers; Choneros; Covicheros; Cuartel de las Feas; Cubanos; El Grupete; Fatales; Gánster; Kater Piler; Lagartos; Latin Kings; Lobos; Mafia 18; Mafia Trébol; Patrones; R7; Tiburones; Tiguerones; Comandos de la Frontera

Casualties and losses
40+ police officers killed 1 prosecutor killed 1 councillor killed 1 mayor killed 1 staffer killed 2 soldiers killed 1 soldier injured	31,000+ suspects arrested (700 of them were accused of being terrorists)
- 6,150 killed (Note: Using data from 9 January 2024 to 1 November 2025); 2,108 civilians kidnapped

On 9 January 2024, an armed conflict broke out in Ecuador involving the country's government against several organized crime groups, most notably the Los Choneros cartel.

Reports of armed attacks throughout Guayaquil and other parts of the country were widespread, occurring primarily in prisons, markets, roads, and universities. The large-scale attacks were a combination of responses to the escape of Los Choneros leader José Adolfo Macías Villamar in Guayaquil, and President Daniel Noboa declaring a state of emergency and then an internal state of war.

== Background ==
The homicide rate in Ecuador rose from 5 to 46 per 100,000 inhabitants between 2017 and 2023. According to political analyst Fernando Carrion, from the Latin American Faculty of Social Sciences, the turning point came when Lenín Moreno came into office in 2017. The new president embarked on a policy of austerity and the security apparatus was weakened by merging several ministries into a single one with a reduced budget. Expenditure on prison security was slashed by a third between 2017 and 2021, despite an increase in the prison population.

The deterioration in social indicators has also made it easier for gangs to recruit. While the poverty rate had fallen from 35% to 21% between 2007 and 2017, the combined effects of a reduction in public spending under the presidencies of Moreno and Guillermo Lasso and the COVID-19 pandemic have pushed it back up to 27% in 2023. Unemployment and the lack of study grants mean that a third of young people aged between 15 and 25, mostly from disadvantaged backgrounds, are neither studying nor working, making them vulnerable to recruitment by criminal groups.

Geographically, Ecuador is located between Colombia and Peru, the two main cocaine producing countries in the world. It also possesses the port of Guayaquil, an important gateway that suffers from poor oversight by Ecuadorian authorities. Until 2016, the Revolutionary Armed Forces of Colombia (FARC) controlled cocaine trafficking operations between Colombia and Ecuador. Following a peace agreement between FARC and the Colombian government that year which led to the former withdrawing from main cocaine producing areas, some dissident FARC members founded their own drug gangs. Due to better control of the Colombian government over transportation hubs, drug trafficking from Colombia decreased and its operations moved to Ecuador.

According to Vox, the lower demand for cocaine in the United States alongside the Colombian peace process created a power vacuum that saw Albanian, Mexican and Venezuelan criminal groups attempt to control drug trafficking routes out of Ecuador. Former interior minister and head of the National Police of Peru, Eduardo Pérez Rocha, said after the conflict began that the increased violence in Ecuador was due to the presence of the international Venezuelan gang Tren de Aragua, resulting with a higher intensity of criminal activity. Since 2018, Ecuador has faced a historic wave of violence as the country has become a critical cocaine transit point, and organized crime groups compete for control of drug routes and prisons. Hundreds of prison inmates have been killed in prison fights.

In 2019 massive riots broke out in response to austerity measures. On 10 October, the capital Quito was overrun by the protesters forcing president Moreno to relocate the government to Guayaquil. Returning the fuel subsidies ended these clashes.

On 2 November 2022 President Guillermo Lasso declared a state of emergency in the provinces of Guayas and Esmeraldas for the next 45 days following the killings of five police officers and the abduction of several prison guards by organized crime members.

== Escape of gang leaders ==
On 7 January 2024, Los Choneros leader José Adolfo Macías Villamar escaped from prison in Guayaquil on the day of his scheduled transfer to a maximum-security prison. The events were reported the next day by authorities, with charges being filed against two corrections officers. On 9 January, Fabricio Colón Pico, the leader of another criminal group, Los Lobos, also escaped from prison in Riobamba four days after he had been arrested for plotting to kill Attorney-General Diana Salazar Méndez.

Following the escape, President Daniel Noboa declared a state of emergency to last for 60 days, granting authorities the power to suspend people's rights and allowing the military to be mobilized inside prisons. A nightly curfew from 11 p.m. to 5 a.m. was imposed during the 60 days. Riots ensued in multiple prisons across Ecuador. A series of attacks took place, including attacks with explosives on businesses and private vehicles and an explosion near the house of the president of the National Court of Justice. On the night of 8 January, four police officers were kidnapped in Quito and Quevedo.

According to The Washington Post, intelligence analysts said that the attacks may have been triggered at least in part by a recent investigation into links between drug traffickers, criminal gangs, and political operators. The operation, known as Metastasis, led to the arrests of at least 20 top security officials and judges in December 2023 for alleged criminal activity benefiting a drug trafficker.

== Conflict ==
=== 2024 ===
==== January ====
On 9 January 2024, organized crime groups in Ecuador issued threats of "war", prompting the country's president to declare a state of armed internal conflict and authorize military operations against these groups. On the same day, Los Choneros gunmen forcibly entered a TC Televisión studio in Guayaquil, where they took journalists hostage during a live newscast. Later in the day, the Ecuadorian police raided the TV studio, released the journalists, and arrested the gang members. One journalist was injured after being shot in the leg while another station employee suffered a broken arm. Some of the attackers were reported to be minors.

In Quito at 3 p.m., officials of the Palacio de Carondelet in the historic center and other state institutions were evacuated for safety. Many businesses closed their commercial activities for the day. An explosive device was later found and deactivated in the vicinity of the Obelisco de la Vicentina. It was also reported that the vehicle restriction system called pico y placa was suspended until further notice.

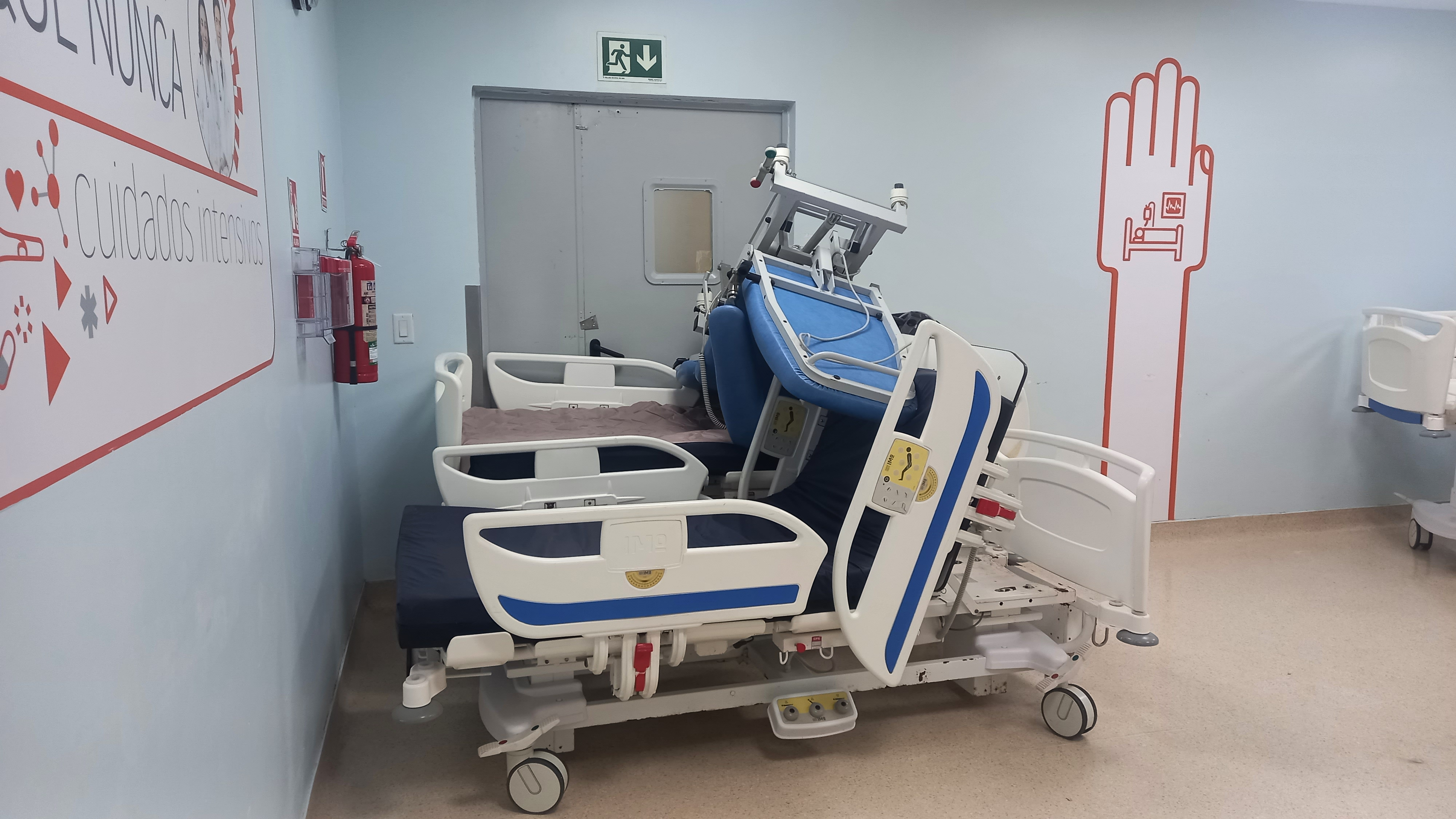
Barricades in the hospital of Los Ceibos in the north of Guayaquil

Several hospitals in Guayaquil were targets of violent acts, including Teodoro Maldonado, Luis Vernaza, Guayaquil, El Niño and Los Ceibos. The assaults on the hospitals ranged from robberies of medical personnel to shooting at medical facilities. During an attack near Ceibos Hospital, the singer Diego Gallardo (also known as "Aire del Golfo") and a high school student were shot and wounded. Both were treated at the same hospital, where Gallardo died from his injuries.

Concurrently, another group took police officers hostage, coercing them to read a message characterizing the events as a reaction to Noboa's declared state of emergency. Additionally, a kidnapping incident unfolded at the University of Guayaquil campus, where students barricaded themselves inside classrooms.

Several attacks on civilians were reported. At the Centro Comercial Albán Borja in Guayaquil, two civilians were shot and killed. Two police officers were killed in an attack in Nobol. Videos began circulating online showing prison guards being executed, while others requested a dialogue with Noboa, threatening to continue killing more guards. One gang announcement threatened to kill anyone out in the streets after 11 p.m. Two vehicles and a gas station were set on fire in Esmeraldas. Explosions were also reported across the country, particularly in Guayaquil, Cuenca, Machala, and Loja, as well as in Esmeraldas and Los Rios Provinces.

Banks, markets, and shops were closed throughout the country in cities such as Quito and Guayaquil to protect merchants and customers from armed attacks.

On 10 January, a special KLM flight was made to Ecuador to get seven Dutch nationals out of the country following an emergency call on X (Twitter) by Dutch television personality Rob Kamphues.

On 11 January, two people were killed and nine others were injured in an arson attack on a nightclub in Coca which also destroyed 11 stores.

On 13 January, the government announced that all 178 prison guards and other employees held hostage in prisons across the country since that start of the unrest by the gangs had been freed.

On 17 January, public prosecutor César Suárez, who was leading the investigation into the attack on the TV station, was shot and killed in a daylight attack in Guayaquil. The gunmen are believed to be members of Los Chone Killers, a splinter group of Los Choneros.

On 18 January, security forces stormed Guayaquil's central prison as part of a major operation. Later that day, the army claimed on X (Twitter) that they were "in control of the external and internal perimeter of the penitentiary complex" and shared photos from within the prison.

On 21 January, police thwarted an attempt by gangs to seize a hospital in Yaguachi, resulting in 68 arrests. It is believed that the failed attack was meant to "rescue a colleague" who had been admitted earlier that day. A rehabilitation center found to contain local gang headquarters was also raided.

==== February ====
On 7 February, soon after leaving a city council meeting, councillor Diana Carnero was shot in Naranjal while filming a video regarding the city's poor road conditions. She died at a local hospital.

On 23 February, three prisoners escaped from a prison in Latacunga that were recently captured by security forces from members of Los Lobos.

==== March ====
On 8 March, President Noboa extended the state of emergency by thirty days. The murder rate had halved from 24 killings a day to twelve and over 11,700 people had been arrested since the beginning of the conflict.

On 16 March, El País reported that the government was creating genetic profiles of inmates to both make it easier to identify deaths in cases of prison riots and in case of identity theft.

On 24 March, Brigitte García, the mayor of San Vicente, was found dead with gunshot wounds in her car in Manabí Province, along with her staffer Jairo Loor. The killer has not been captured.

On 28 March, three inmates were killed and six others were injured following a prison riot at the Regional 8 penitentiary in Guayaquil.

On 29 March, eleven people were abducted in Manabí Province. Five of them were later found killed execution-style while the remaining six, including five children, were released. Two suspects were released the next day. Police said the victims may have been tourists caught up in a drug dispute.

On 31 March, nine people were killed and ten others were injured after gunmen opened fire on a group of people practicing sports on a street in Guasmo, a neighborhood in Guayaquil.

==== April ====
On 17 April, Jose Sanchez, the mayor of Camilo Ponce Enríquez, Azuay Province, was shot dead, followed on 19 April by Jorge Maldonado, the mayor of Portovelo, El Oro Province.

On 22 April, a dismembered body inside a bag was found near the residence of Diana Salazar in Quito, it was later reported that the victim was identified as a 19-year old Venezuelan and that the killing might have been a "message" directed to Salazar.

==== May ====
On 11 May, eight people were killed in a gun attack on a bar hosting a birthday party in Chanduy, Santa Elena Province.

==== June ====
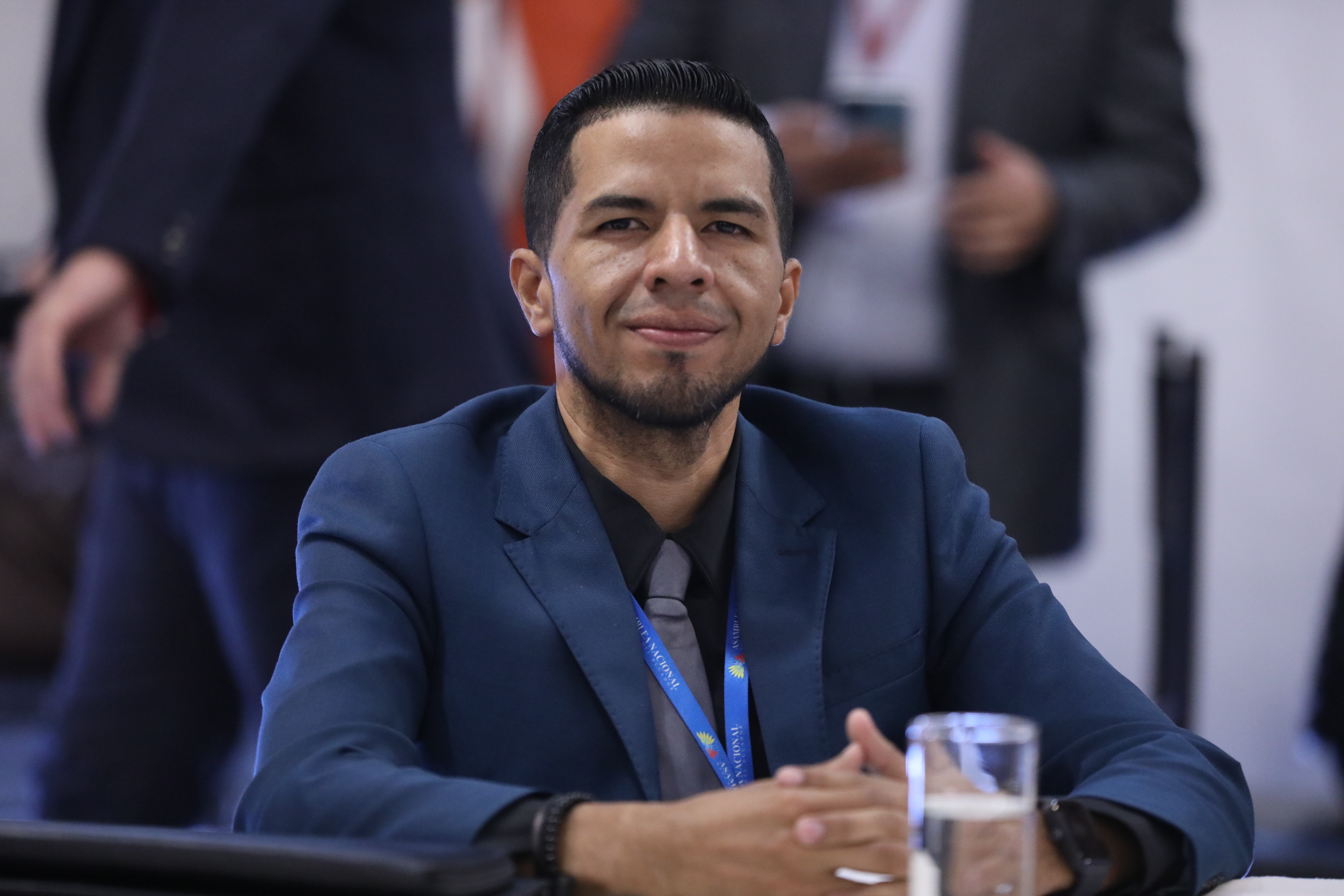
Alternate assemblyman Cristhian Nieto was killed alongside his wife on 2 June.

On 2 June, Cristhian Nieto, alternate assemblyman for Mónica Salazar, alongside his wife Nicole Burgos and a bystander Steven Mendoza were killed inside a circus in Manta, Manabí Province.

==== September ====
On 3 September director of Lago Agrio prison Alex Guevara was killed by gunshot in a targeted assassination. On 12 September, María Daniela Icaza, director of Litoral Penitentiary, was killed in a targeted shooting.

==== October ====
On 23 October, Ecuadorian police said that two men involved in the TV attack in Guayaquil on 9 January had been arrested in Spain. This included William Alcívar Bautista, the leader of the Tiguerones.

==== November ====
On 28 November, a 17-year-old girl was abducted by four local gang members near her home in Cota Mil, she was then robbed, forced out of the car and shot several times, her body was discovered the following morning.

==== December ====
On 1 December, ten men in a rental home, in the town of El Guabo, were gunned down by members of the Sao-Box cartel.

On 5 December, the prison director of El Oro No. 1 Deprivation of Liberty Center and one other person were attacked by armed men while driving in a vehicle. The prognosis of both victims is guarded.

=== 2026 ===
==== March ====
In March 2026, Ecuador sank a Narco-submarine located in a mangrove swamp in the Cayapas–Mataje nature reserve near the Northern border, with a drug smuggling camp located nearby.

Later in the month, Colombian President Gustavo Petro claimed that Ecuador had bombed a site in Colombia along the Colombia–Ecuador border, after the burned remains of 27 individuals and an unexploded bomb were discovered. Noboa retorted that the Ecuadorian military only fought within the borders Ecuador, but continued saying that Ecuador would continue to fight "narco-terrorism", pointing out that many of those he described as such were of Colombian origin. He went further exclaiming that Petro neglected the border and in so doing allowed criminal groups into Columbia. This rhetoric on both sides came in the midst of a tariff standoff between the two nations, that began in January, when Ecuador placed a "security tax" tariff on Colombia at a rate of 30%, due to the Ecuadorians government's perceived lacking of Colombia controlling its border. Colombia responded with reciprocal tariffs in return.

== Direct United States participation and bombing ==
On March 3, 2026, Ecuador and the United States under the United States Southern Command launched joint military operations against Ecuadorian based drug traffickers. At the time details on the matter remained classified and did not specify any key details on the matter. The same day the New York Times indicated that the U.S. was not directly participating in these operations, but were instead providing intelligence and logistical support, as well as U.S. special forces training, for Ecuadorian Commandos.

However a few days later on March 6, Ecuador with direct United States participation conducted "Operation Total Extermination" in which the U.S. and Ecuador bombed Comandos de la Frontera, a group of FARC dissidents along the Colombian border, who are accused of drug smuggling. It was not clear how many were killed or captured, but it has been indicated that the Comandos camp had a capacity of 50 people according to Ecuador's defense ministry. This marks the first instance of a direct military participation by the United States in the Ecuadorian conflict. It was later clarified by USSOUTHCOM that the strike specifically targeted one of the hideouts for the Comandos' current leader Mono Tole, which also served as a training center for Comandos' drug trafickers.

A few months later on August 28th, 2026 United States Marines began a campaign of boarding and sinking suspected cartel narco refuelers.

== Government response ==
On 9 January 2024 (the day after the declaration of the state of emergency), President Daniel Noboa declared in a decree that the country was experiencing an "internal armed conflict" and ordered the military to carry out operations to neutralize armed groups. The head of the Armed Forces of Ecuador, Jaime Vela Erazo said in response to the decree that there will be "no negotiations" with armed groups. Noboa identified these organized crime groups as "terrorist organizations and belligerent non-state actors". The National Assembly subsequently unanimously approved the security measures that were put in place. That same day, the Ministry of Education suspended in-person classes and mandated virtual learning until 12 January.

Noboa announced that transportation in Quito would cease operations, except for the Quito Metro, which would run under limited stops and hours. He also stated that the Mariscal Sucre International Airport in Quito would remain open but with increased security. Noboa also said that foreign inmates were to be deported to reduce the prison population.

A constitutional referendum on tougher security measures was held on 21 April 2024. Voters approved all proposed security measures.

== Reactions ==
=== Domestic ===
- The Confederation of Indigenous Nationalities of Ecuador and the Ecuadorian Episcopal Conference called for national unity to overcome the "situation of unprecedented violence caused by organized crime." They emphasized that the national government must act within the current legal framework. Furthermore, they stressed that the state should not use this crisis "as an excuse to approve unpopular laws or policies that adversely affect the majority of the population."
- Former Ecuadorian president Rafael Correa expressed support for Noboa's decision to declare an "internal armed conflict" in the country. He endorsed Noboa's order for the Armed Forces of Ecuador to take action and called for national unity.
- President Noboa has introduced the "Phoenix Plan," which involves the establishment of a new intelligence unit, tactical weapons for security forces, new high-security prisons, and reinforced security at ports and airports.

=== International ===
==== Countries ====
- Argentina: The Argentine Government expressed support for the authorities and people of Ecuador in their "struggle against organized crime, which seeks to undermine the rule of law." The Minister for Security, Patricia Bullrich, announced that the government would offer armed assistance to Ecuador, stating that drug trafficking was a "continental issue". On 19 January, Bullrich announced that Macias’ wife and children had been detained in Córdoba Province and repatriated to Ecuador.
- Brazil: The Brazilian government expressed concern over the violent incidents in Ecuador. It also conveyed its "solidarity with both the Ecuadorian Government and the Ecuadorian people who have fallen victim to these attacks."
- Chile: The Chilean Foreign Ministry issued a statement expressing its concern, extending its support to the "Ecuadorian institutions and conveying a message of solidarity and support to their authorities and people."
- China: The country announced the temporary closure of its embassy and consulates in Ecuador on 10 January.
- Colombia: The Colombian Foreign Ministry indicated its support for the democratic institutions and the rule of law of the neighboring country through a press release. It also expressed solidarity with those affected and wished for the restoration of public order. The Colombian army said that it was increasing security measures along the border with Ecuador.
- Costa Rica, Dominican Republic, Panama: The three countries jointly expressed their support and solidarity with the Government of Ecuador. Panamanian Laurentino Cortizo also expressed regret at the crisis in Ecuador and expressed solidarity with President Noboa.
- France: The country warned its nationals against traveling to Ecuador.
- Mexico: Mexican Ambassador to Ecuador Raquel Serur appealed for calm and urged everyone to follow local authorities' instructions, stay at home, and avoid attending large-scale events.
- Netherlands: The Ministry of Foreign Affairs warned people traveling to Ecuador not to visit the border area with Colombia and recommended only essential travel to Esmeraldas Province.
- Paraguay: The country expressed its solidarity with the people and Government of Ecuador amidst the "delicate internal security situation."
- Peru: Prime Minister Alberto Otarola declared an emergency along the border with Ecuador and ordered the deployment of the Peruvian army to bolster National Police units sent there by Interior Minister Víctor Torres Falcón.
- Russia: The country warned its nationals against traveling to Ecuador.
- United States: Ambassador Brian A. Nichols, the Assistant Secretary of State for Western Hemisphere Affairs, expressed concern about "the violence and kidnappings" and said that the U.S. was "ready to provide assistance to the Ecuadorian government and will remain in close contact with the President regarding our support." National Security Council Advisor Jake Sullivan said that the U.S. was "committed to supporting Ecuadorians' security & prosperity & bolstering cooperation w/partners to ensure the perpetrators are brought to justice." The U.S. embassy in Quito canceled consular services on 10 January. Sanctions against Los Choneros were filed on 7 February. On 4 September 2025, U.S. Secretary of State Marco Rubio announced that Los Lobos and Los Choneros were designated as terror groups.
- Uruguay: The Ministry of Foreign Relations issued a statement in which it expressed its "solidarity with the Ecuadorian authorities" on behalf of the Uruguayan Government and that it ensures the "reestablishment of internal order within the strict framework of the current institutions that allows the recovery of "citizen coexistence". In addition, it was announced that the Embassy of Uruguay is closely following the development of events and an emergency line was enabled for Uruguayan citizens in Ecuador.
- Venezuela: President Nicolás Maduro wrote on Twitter, "I strongly reject the violence unleashed by Ecuadorian criminal gangs that put the security and peace of our sister Republic at risk and express, on behalf of Venezuela, our solidarity with the people and government of Ecuador in this fight against the scourge of organized crime. I trust in the prompt restoration of order and in the timely action of justice against the intellectual and material authors of these unacceptable terrorist acts."

==== Supranational organizations ====
- European Union: Foreign policy chief Josep Borrell described the increased gang activity as a "direct attack on democracy and the rule of law".
- United Nations: Secretary-General António Guterres expressed alarm at the "deteriorating situation in the country as well as its disruptive impact on the lives of Ecuadorans".

== See also ==
- Shield of the Americas
