= Women in Ecuador =

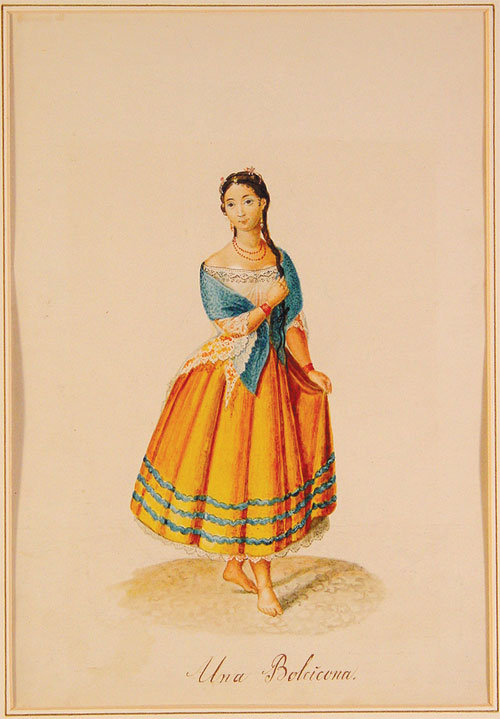
- A portrait of a woman from Ecuador, 1867

General statistics
- Maternal mortality (per 100,000): 110 (2010)
- Women in parliament: 38.7% (2013)
- Women over 25 with secondary education: 40.1% (2012)
- Women in labour force: 54.4% (2012)

Gender Inequality Index
- Value: 0.362 (2021)
- Rank: 85th out of 191

Global Gender Gap Index
- Value: 0.743 (2022)
- Rank: 41st out of 146

Women in Ecuador represent 51.7% of the total population, amounting to 8.7 million, according to the 2022 Census. The majority identify as mestiza (77.4%), followed by Indigenous (7.7%) and Afro-Ecuadorian (4.9%). Nearly half of the female population is single, and most have completed only basic general education. For the first time, the census included a question on sexual identity, revealing that 88% of women identify as heterosexual, while 2.4% consider themselves part of the LGBTI community.

Ecuadorian women are generally responsible for the upbringing and care of children and families; traditionally, men have not taken an active role. Ever more women have been joining the workforce. This change has been greatly influenced by Eloy Alfaro's liberal revolution in 1906, in which Ecuadorian women were granted the right to work.

== Marriage, fertility, and family life ==
Between 1895 and 1911, Ecuador underwent a historical process of legal reforms that transitioned the regulation of marriage and divorce from ecclesiastical to civil law. Initially, these institutions were governed by Canon Law and colonial regulations. With the Liberal Revolution and the separation of Church and State, civil marriage was officially recognized in 1902, and divorce was allowed in cases of female adultery. In 1911, the Law of Economic Emancipation of Married Women was enacted, recognizing their property rights. However, the legal authority of the husband over the wife (marital power) remained in place until it was abolished in 1970 with the reform of the Civil Code.

In Ecuador, the family continues to play a central role in social, economic, and cultural structures. Historically, caregiving responsibilities have been primarily assigned to women, while men have engaged in income-generating activities. However, demographic and social indicators suggest a shift in these traditional roles. Fertility rates have declined substantially—from an average of seven children per woman in the 1950s to 1.8 in recent years. The average age for first-time motherhood has increased from 21 years in 2010 to 28, and the average age of marriage has risen to 32. Additionally, the proportion of female-headed households has grown to 38.5%, an increase of nearly 10 percentage points since 2010.

Adolescent pregnancy is a major contributing factor to child marriage and early unions. Approximately one-third of pregnancies in the region occur among girls under the age of 18, with 20% involving girls younger than 15. Many of these pregnancies are linked to sexual violence, reflecting the high vulnerability of adolescents.

Over the past decade, births among girls aged 10–14 increased by 78%, and among those aged 15–19 by 11%. Additionally, 44 out of 100 women had their first child between ages 15 and 19. Adolescent pregnancy is more prevalent among poorer, less-educated girls, particularly in rural areas. Girls who drop out of school are seven times more likely to become pregnant. Between 2010 and 2013, 3,864 girls under the age of 14 were forced into motherhood as a result of rape, highlighting serious physical, psychological, and social consequences.

== Reproductive health and rights ==
Poor information and access to contraceptive methods often lead to unwanted pregnancies, especially among teenage girls and young women. The maternal mortality rate in Ecuador remained at 66 deaths/100,000 live births in 2020, the same level as in 2015. According to the Ministry of Public Health (MSP), by 2023, there are 48,782 people living with HIV/AIDS.

Abortion in Ecuador is illegal, with only few exceptions for special circumstances: When the abortion is performed to prevent a risk to life or health (physical, mental, or social) that cannot be avoided by other means, or when the pregnancy is the result of rape.

In recent years, being confronted with the highest teenage pregnancy rate in South America, Ecuador has decided to liberalize its policy regarding contraception, including emergency contraception. In 2023, there were 42.8 live births per 1000 adolescents aged 15 to 19. Although the rate dropped by 26 points from 2018 to 2023, Ecuador's rate remains higher than the global average, which was 41.3 births.

A study was conducted in 2017 to identify infectious diseases associated to preterm delivery. This study focused on the effects of the Zika virus on pregnant women. The study found that thirty-two of the fifty-nine women tested were Zika positive. They found that the virus was prevalent in the women's reproductive tract. The Zika virus has been linked with birth defects in newborns. These defects include microcephaly, Guillain-Barré syndrome, and a weakened immune and nervous system.

== Political rights and participation ==
The journey for women's suffrage in Ecuador started with Matilde Hidalgo, the country's first female voter who cast her ballot on May 10, 1924. Hidalgo became the first woman to earn a medical degree in the country, signifying an important milestone in the history of women's education and women's rights. Her efforts and determination helped her become the first woman in Latin America to vote, thus opening the doors for women's active participation in politics and civic life. Women's suffrage was granted in 1929.

Various initiatives, such as the Political Parity Index (IPP) by UNDP, UN Women, and IDEA International, aim to promote gender equality. In December 2022, Ecuador scored 59 out of 100 on the IPP, indicating a 41-point gap to achieve political parity.

In Ecuador, the National Electoral Council (CNE) is responsible for overseeing that political organizations carry out internal democratic processes for candidate selection and ensure gender parity. This includes 50% female representation, alternation between male and female candidates, and the inclusion of youth.

- Executive Branch: Women's participation in executive positions remains limited. As of 2022, only 25% of ministries were led by women, resulting in a score of 50 in the Political Parity Index. There was no recorded presence of Indigenous or Afro-Ecuadorian women in these roles. Although Ecuador briefly had a female president, Rosalía Arteaga, in 1997, her mandate lasted only six days under exceptional circumstances.
- Legislative Branch: In the National Assembly, 39.4% of the 137 seats were held by women during the 2021–2025 term (54 women and 83 men). Despite constitutional mandates and the 2020 reform of the Organic Electoral Law requiring absolute parity and female candidates leading party lists, the anticipated increase in female representation was not fully achieved. Ecuador received a score of 57.8 in this dimension.
- Judicial and Electoral Branches: This area received the lowest score (29.2). Female representation remains low in both the judicial system and electoral bodies. The score for women judges in the National Court of Justice was 47.6, and for the Electoral Contentious Tribunal, 40 points, as only one of five judges is a woman. Additionally, a score of 0 was recorded due to the absence of gender mechanisms in the highest electoral judicial body.

== Education and literacy ==
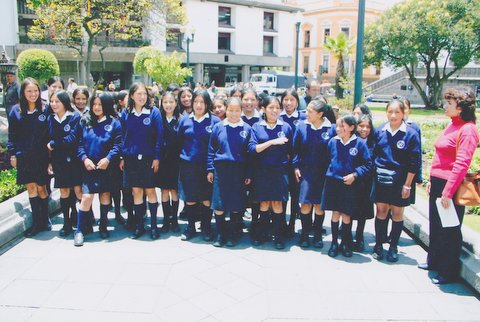
School girls in Ecuador

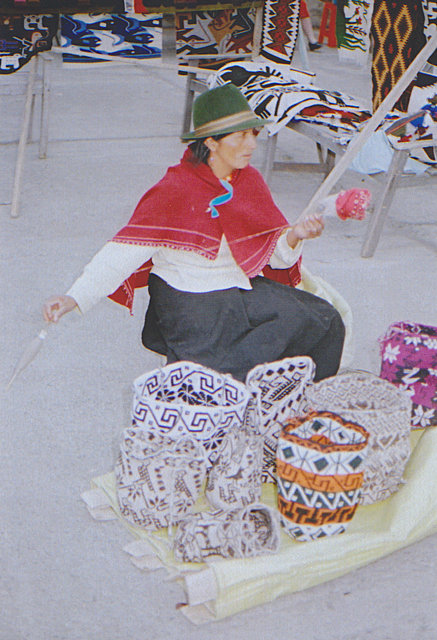
Spinning woman in a market in Ecuador

From 1930 to 1940, Ecuadorian women began to take on a more active role in society, fighting for visibility and autonomy while rejecting male domination. In 1941, María Angélica Carrillo founded Colegio 24 de Mayo, the first secondary school for women in Quito. During the 1940s, women stood out in areas such as literature, music, and art, with Carlota Jaramillo being one of the first to venture into theater and music. In 1932, institutions dedicated to women's education, particularly for working-class women, were established, offering training programs in sewing, cooking, and other practical skills. These efforts aimed to prepare a skilled working class, both male and female. During the same period, Indigenous leaders such as Tránsito Amaguaña and Dolores Cacuango founded bilingual schools in Kichwa and Spanish in Cayambe, marking a significant advancement in Indigenous education.

Girls traditionally have been less likely to be formally educated than men. Traditional gender roles lead women towards 'female jobs', such as nursing and teaching, which are underpaid and under-appreciated. Women still have a lower literacy rate than men: as of 2022, the literacy rate in Ecuador was 93,95%, 93,05% female and 94,93% male. In recent years, several programs have promoted education for the indigenous girls and women.

The situation for indigenous people is worse. When it comes to educational attainment in 1999, while the number for non-indigenous females aged 12–65 was 8.0 years to complete the education, indigenous females had only 3.8 years. It means that indigenous women can take less time to study compared to men. In terms of school enrollment rate, there is no big difference for primary school because of gender difference and indigenous or not, but indigenous females had much less lower-secondary and higher-secondary enrollment rates. For lower-secondary, indigenous females had only 10.08% while non-indigenous females had 59.79%. These facts make it more difficult for indigenous people in Ecuador to get a job. In Kichwa's case, mestiza women tend to be hired more than Kichwa women because many people assume that indigenous people are not "advanced." It is a common idea that mestiza are more intelligent like WASPs.

Social reproduction happens among women in Ecuador in terms of education. According to Shenton's interview, some women had attended a university, own their own business, and they seek to let their daughters do what they did. Shenton stated that it is an obligation for educated people to provide their children with the education. They hope their children get educated and have more possibilities for their life.

As of March 2025, only 22.3% of the female population in Ecuador holds an undergraduate or postgraduate degree, and just 2.2% have attained a doctoral degree, although women make up 51.3% of the population. Despite these figures, the INEC considers this percentage to reflect significant progress in women's academic attainment and specialization in the country.

== Employment ==
Women are more likely to be unemployed compared to men. In August 2024, the unemployment rate for women in Ecuador was 5.9%, and male unemployment was 2.6%. In 2023, 53.19% of women aged 15 and older participated in the labor force, compared to 77.92% of men, showing a gender gap of 24.73 percentage points.

In June 2024, the average monthly income for employed women in Ecuador was $402.20, while for men it was $494.90, according to data from the National Institute of Statistics and Census (INEC). This indicates that women earned approximately 18.8% less than men during that period.

However, in recent years, women's roles in Ecuadorian society have evolved, including increased business leadership. The Violet Economy Law, approved on January 10, 2023, promotes employment opportunities for women. Linked to the Gender Parity Initiative's Action Plan, the law presents challenges and opportunities for both the public and private sectors. Key provisions include 12 weeks of paid maternity leave, which can be shared with fathers up to 75% of the time, and 12 months of lactation leave with a reduced workday of 6 hours and two hours per day for breastfeeding.

The role of women in business has grown, with 423,509 women owning businesses, particularly in commerce and services. Additionally, 10,261 women hold leadership and management positions in medium and large companies, contributing significantly to the country's economy. According to the Global Entrepreneurship Monitor (2023-2024), Ecuador stands out as the country with the highest percentage of women entrepreneurs in Latin America, with a rate of 33.4%.

== Gender-based violence ==
Domestic violence against women is a very serious problem. La Ley Contra la Violencia a la Mujer y la Familia (Law on Violence against Women and the Family) deals with domestic violence. This law was heavily influenced by the Consejo Nacional de las Mujeres CONAMU (National Council of Women). A rough translation of their missions statement is to further enable our efforts and resources to create conditions of equality for women and to develop a society where women are included in economic, political, social, and cultural ways of life. The council believes this can be achieved if we focus on creating a violence-free society, a society where women's physical and psychological well-being is protected.

A study was conducted with data from 2010 comparing woman's wealth to domestic violence in Ecuador. They found that violence increased when the man was the only source of income, and saw no significant relationship when the woman had higher wealth than the man. In addition, a reform was made to the Comprehensive Organic Penal Code (COIP) in Ecuador, femicide and discrimination were classified as a criminal offense. Sanctions were established for violence against women or members of the family unit, and the violation of privacy was also classified as a crime.

In 2024, gender-based violence against women in Ecuador increased due to the security crisis that the country faced after being declared in a situation of internal armed conflict on January 9. According to the Council of the Judiciary, there were 424 violent deaths of women due to gender-based reasons in 2022, 584 in 2023, and 180 cases by September 2024, of which:

- 96 were intimate femicides (committed by partners or ex-partners),
- 71 were femicides related to criminal systems, and
- 13 were transfemicides

The province of Guayas leads the list of provinces with the highest violence against women, followed by Manabí and Los Ríos.

Regarding human trafficking, between 2019 and 2022, the National Police recorded 475 victims of this crime, primarily women between the ages of 19 and 29. Trafficking for sexual exploitation mainly affects Ecuadorian women, followed by Colombian and Venezuelan women. Vulnerability is a common characteristic among the victims, exacerbated by risk factors such as economic hardship, irregular or forced migration, irregular status, and gender dependence in intimate relationships.

== Gender equality ==
The National Council for Gender Equality (CNIG) originated in 1970 as an entity focused on the rights of working women. Over the years, it underwent several institutional transformations, becoming the National Council of Women (CONAMU) in 1997. The 2008 Constitution established the National Councils for Equality, and in 2014, the corresponding Organic Law formally recognized the CNIG as the state mechanism specialized in gender, also encompassing the rights of LGBTI individuals.

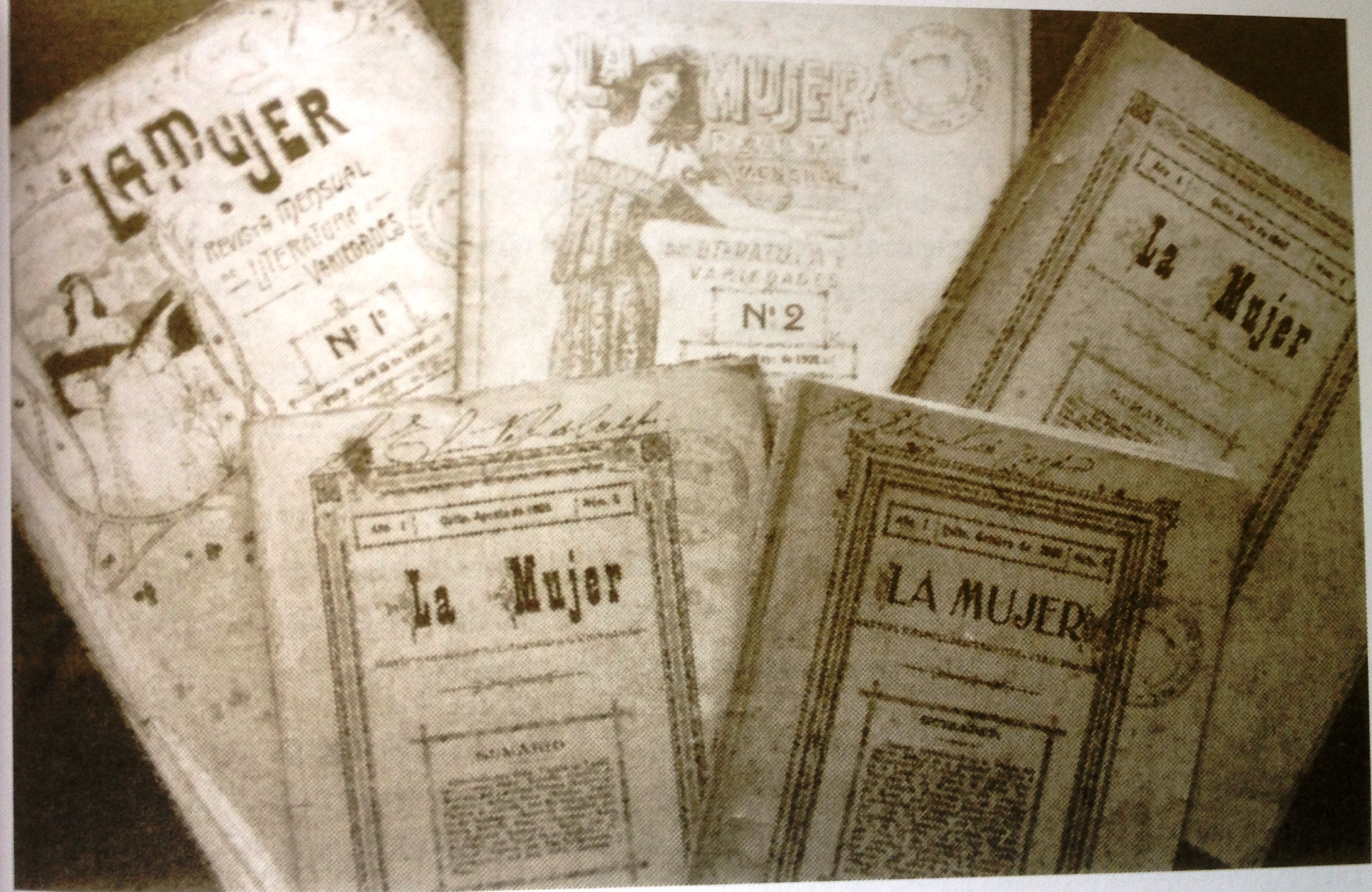
Magazine La Mujer, First feminist magazine in Ecuador founded by Zoila Ugarte de Landivar in 1905

In parallel, women's organizations linked to indigenous, peasant, and Afro-descendant social movements have emerged, such as Luna Creciente and Mujeres Luchando por la Vida. Some of these groups maintain direct relations with the state, while others operate autonomously within regional networks.

Historically, the Ecuadorian feminist movement has played an active role in political processes since the republican era. Its engagement has evolved through various phases, including its consolidation in the 1980s, a strategic reconfiguration in 1995 in relation to the state and social movements, and its influence during key political moments such as the approval of the 1998 Constitution. Notable figures in this history include Manuela Sáenz, Nela Martínez, and Zoila Ugarte.

== See also ==
- Human trafficking in Ecuador
- Domestic violence in Ecuador
