= Idrobo =

Idrobo is a surname. Notable people with the surname include:

- María Alejandra Idrobo (born 1988), Colombian athlete
- María Angélica Idrobo (1890–1956), Ecuadorian writer and feminist activist
