= El Guabo massacre =

Massacre of 10 men in El Guabo, Ecuador

- Part of the 2024 Ecuadorian conflict
- Location: El Guabo, El Oro Province Ecuador
- Date: 1 December 2024 c. 5 a.m.
- Attack type: Mass shooting, vehicle-ramming attack, beheading and dismemberment
- Deaths: 10
- Perpetrator: Sao-Box cartel (suspected)

The El Guabo massacre was an attack committed on 1 December 2024, where nine Colombian men and an Ecuadorian man were murdered by members of a gang in the town of El Guabo, Ecuador.

== Massacre ==
At around 5 a.m. on 1 December 2024, 10 men who were sleeping inside a home they had rented days before, in the La Victoria sector of El Guabo were attacked by men armed with 9 mm caliber handguns and .45 caliber assault rifles. Five of them in the house were killed, while the other five ran out in the street where four of them were gunned down and ran over. The last man was chased for around a kilometer, before being caught and then beheaded, they then dismembered his body and stuffed it in a sandbag.

The men were murdered by a group possibly the Sao-Box cartel who are aligned with Los Lobos, a pamphlet that was found at the scene read "Anyone who copies the damned Mirror Wolves will be discharged."

=== Victims ===
The first four victims were identified as Marco Antonio Isves Niemes, Samuel Antonio Cárdenas Cortés, Alejandro Saiz Poveda and Luis Heli Patarroyo Urrego . A few hours later Luis Guillermo Banquet Rivero, Diego David Benavides Cifuentes, Yostin Riascos Romero, José Miguel Araujo Buila and Alexander Arroyo were identified. Finally, the man who was found dismembered was identified as Nepomuceano Ramos Madronero. Out of the 10 men only one of them had previous charges with narcotics, that being José Miguel Araujo.

Nine of the victims were from Colombia, with only Marco Antonio Isves being Ecuadorian.

Four days later on 5 December a 47-year-old man Saúl "Chapatín" Orellana was shot and killed by unknown cartel members in El Guabo.
