= Mercedes González Tola =

Ecuadorian poet and feminist (1860–1911)

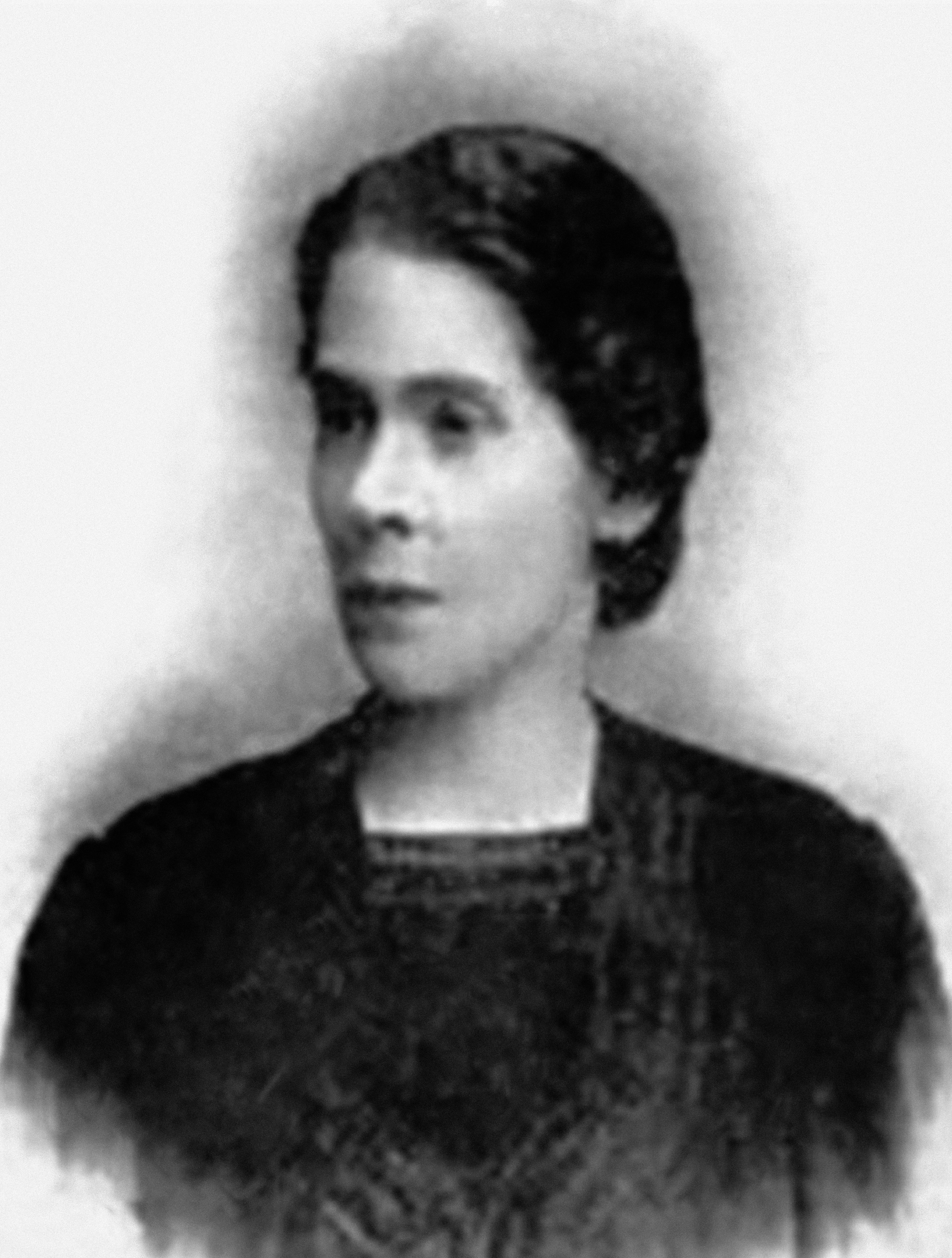
- Born: 12 October 1860; Guayaquil, Ecuador
- Died: 23 September 1911 (aged 50); Quito, Ecuador
- Spouse: Aurelio Moscoso
- Children: 2
- Writing career
- Pen name: Mercedes G. de Moscoso, M.G. de M, Rosa del Valle
- Notable work: Reminiscencias (1890)
- Literary movement: Romanticism

Mercedes González Tola (12 October 1860 – 23 September 1911), also known in the literary field as Mercedes G. de Moscoso, M.G. de M or by the pen name Rosa del Valle, was an Ecuadorian poet, playwright and writer of the romanticism movement. She later became an activist with the feminist movement and directed the National Library of Ecuador from 1906 until her death.

== Early life and family ==
Mercedes González Tola was born on 12 October 1860 in Guayaquil, Ecuador. Her parents were Nicolás Augusto González Navarrete and Guadalupe Tola Dávalos. Her father was involved in politics as a secret agent for Vicente Rocafuerte, leading the family to spend ten years in exile in Lima, Peru. They returned to Guayaquil in 1875 after the assassination of president Gabriel García Moreno.

González Tola married her distant relative Aurelio Moscoso and they had two children. Her first child died in infancy.

== Career ==
González Tola was a poet, playwright and writer. She was sometimes known the literary field as Mercedes G. de Moscoso or M.G. de M and additionally used the pen name Rosa del Valle. Her brother Nicolás Augusto González Tola also became a poet.

Many of her works were sentimental, intimate and introspective, focusing on family life and loss, including Reminiscencias (1890), En el Nido (1899) and the play Abuela (1903). She adapted Abuela into a three act play in 1907.

Alongside her writing career, González Tola was appointed as director of the National Library of Ecuador in Quito in 1906. During her time as director, González Tola requested funds and resources to modernise the library and the first exchanged program was established. She worked as director until her death in 1911 and was succeeded by Zoila Ugarte de Landívar.

González Tola was also involved in the Ecuadorian feminist movement. She contributed to Ecuardor's first feminist magazine, La Mujer.

== Death ==
González Tola died on 23 September 1911 in Quito, Ecuador.
