= La Mujer (magazine) =

Ecuadorian women's magazine

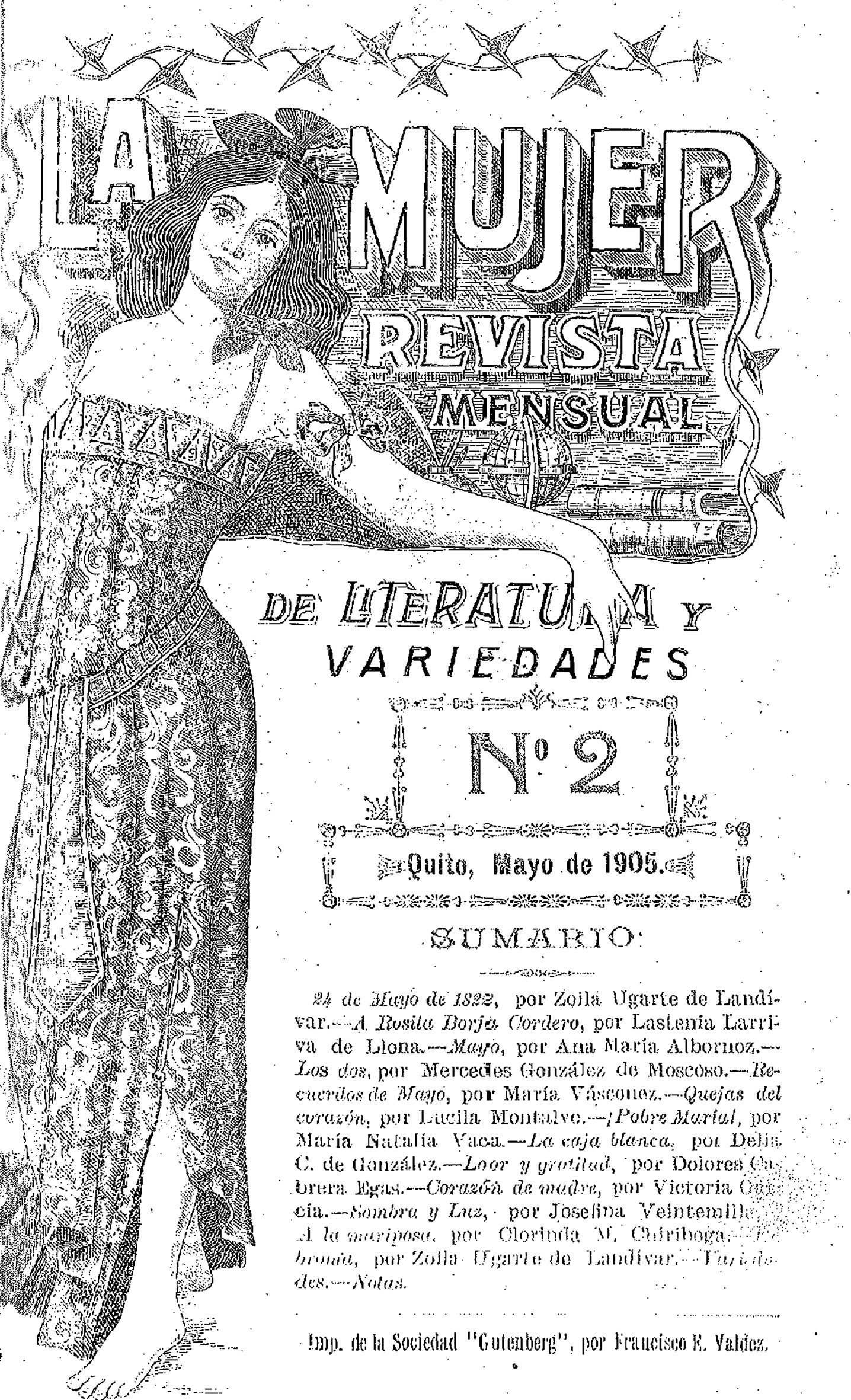
- Editor: Zoila Ugarte de Landívar
- Categories: Women's magazine
- Frequency: Monthly
- Founder: Zoila Ugarte de Landívar
- First issue: 15 April 1905
- Final issue: October 1905
- Country: Ecuador
- Language: Spanish

La Mujer was the first Ecuadorian women's magazine, founded by Zoila Ugarte in 1905 with the subtitle "Revista Mensual de Literatura y Variedades".: It published: historical reviews, poetry, stories, political opinions and openly commented on the inequality of rights for women at the time.

== History ==
The first issue of the Journal appeared on April 15, 1905, with a length of 32 pages; the publications were anonymous, and the editorial was written by the founder, Zoila Ugarte, who expressed her protest for the place of women in society, gender equity, and above all, access to education. Since the second issue, the name of the author was included in each article.

Only six issues of the magazine appeared, since on several occasions the printing press was closed at the request of various social sectors, especially the Catholic Church, because of their opposition to suffragette and feminist comments. Its last publication was in October 1905.

== Contributors ==
The most outstanding contributors to the magazine were

- Maria Natalia Vaca
- Mercedes González de Moscoso
- Isabel Donoso de Espinel
- Lastenia Larriva de Llona
- Ana Maria Albornoz
- Josephine Veintemilla
- Dolores Sucre
- Delia C. de Gonzalez
