= Jaime Vela Erazo =

Ecuadorian military leader

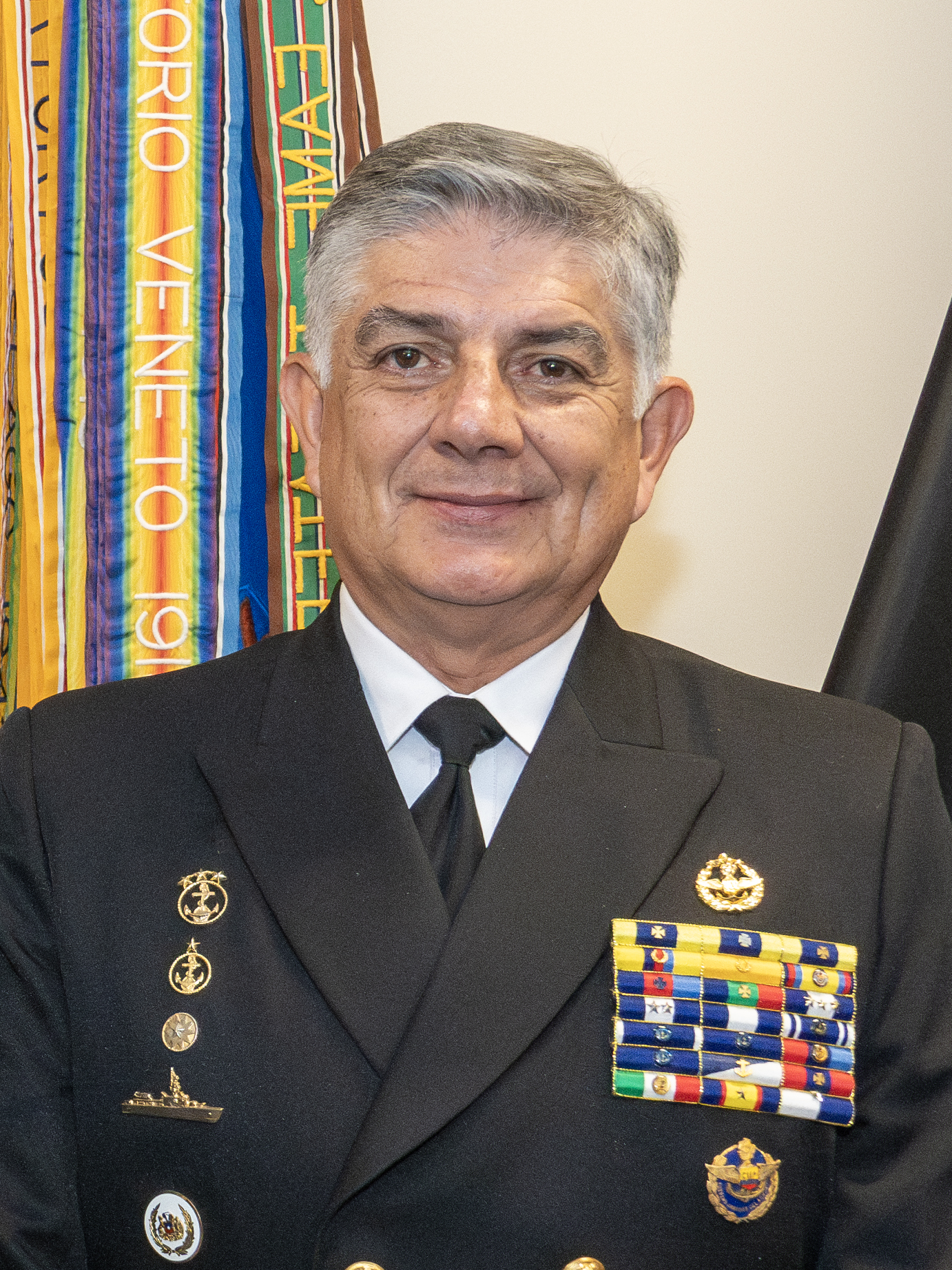
Admiral Jaime Patricio Vela Erazo in 2024

Rear Admiral Jaime Patricio Vela Erazo (born January 23, 1964) is an Ecuadorian military leader. He is the commander of the Armed Forces of Ecuador. Vela Erazo is serving the Ecuadorian Navy since December 1985.

In the January 2024 conflict, Vela Erazo has led the military response to the crisis. Vela Erazo has "vowed not to back down or negotiate with armed groups".
