= 2024 Ecuadorian constitutional referendum =

Referendum

A constitutional referendum was held in Ecuador on 21 April 2024, amid the 2024 Ecuadorian conflict.

The referendum was held on proposed security measures. In January 2024, the Constitutional Court had blocked nine proposed questions. Items F through K were structured as a popular consultation rather than a constitutional question.

== Results ==
Nine of the eleven referendum measures passed, with a reported voter turnout of 72%. The measures that were approved were all security-related, and that with the highest support permits the country's army to carry out operations with police without a state of emergency having been declared beforehand.

Prop.	Theme	Yes		No		Blank votes	Invalid votes	Total	Registered voters	Turnout	Outcome
Prop.	Theme	Votes	%	Votes	%	Blank votes	Invalid votes	Total	Registered voters	Turnout	Outcome
A	Army support to police in combatting drug trafficking, money laundering, arms trafficking, trafficking in persons, terrorism, illegal mining, extortion and intimidation, and organized crime	7,077,124	72.24	2,719,902	27.76	378,147	616,463	10,791,636			Approved
B	Allowing extradition	6,261,740	64.34	3,471,123	35.66	438,561	620,119	10,791,543			Approved
C	Specialized constitutional justices	5,768,730	59.92	3,859,366	40.08	535,220	627,808	10,791,124			Approved
D	Recognizing international arbitration as a method of settling investment, contractual or commercial disputes	3,312,419	34.83	6,197,467	65.17	503,561	777,158	10,790,605			Rejected
E	Reform of the Labour Code regarding fixed-term and hourly contracts, when entered into for the first time	2,910,916	30.49	6,636,892	69.51	520,748	722,278	10,790,834			Rejected
F	Giving the Army competence for carrying out permanent control of weapons, ammunition, explosives and accessories on the routes, roads, roads and corridors authorized for entry to social rehabilitation centers	6,741,974	69.66	2,936,418	30.34	482,760	629,913	10,791,065			Approved
G	Increase in criminal penalties for terrorism and its financing, illicit production and trafficking of controlled substances, organized crime, murder, contract killings, human trafficking, kidnapping for ransom, arms trafficking, money laundering, and illegal activity with mineral resources	6,501,332	67.34	3,153,674	32.66	520,950	615,159	10,791,115			Approved
H	Reform of COIP to allow full criminal sentencing within a social rehabilitation center for criminal recruitment of children and adolescents, kidnapping for ransom, illicit production of scheduled controlled substances, illegal activity with mineral resources, possession of prohibited or unauthorized firearms, ammunition and explosives, unauthorized possession and carrying of weapons, extortion, disclosure of identity of an undercover agent, informant, witness, protected person, or protected judicial officer, influence peddling, solicitation of influence peddling, and frontmanship	6,429,400	66.68	3,212,147	33.32	535,928	613,824	10,791,299			Approved
I	Criminalization of civilians possessing or carrying weapons, ammunition, or their components that are for the exclusive use of the Armed Forces or the National Police	6,142,321	63.90	3,470,555	36.10	564,855	613,466	10,791,197			Approved
J	Allowing National Police and Army use of seized weapons	6,152,532	64.06	3,451,562	35.94	581,874	604,893	10,790,861			Approved
K	Expropriation of seized property	5,843,682	60.99	3,737,057	39.01	612,303	598,338	10,791,380			Approved
Source: CNE
