= Domestic violence in Ecuador =

Domestic violence in Ecuador is a pervasive issue that disproportionately affects women and reflects broader challenges in the country's efforts to address gender-based violence. Although Ecuador has adopted progressive laws and international commitments over the past four decades, enforcement remains weak. As a result, domestic abuse often goes underreported. Surveys reveal that the majority of Ecuadorian women have experienced some form of violence in their lifetimes, psychological and physical abuse by intimate partners are particularly common. The situation is further complicated by deeply rooted cultural attitudes, systemic impunity, and the involvement of state institutions in both perpetuating and failing to adequately address abuse. High-profile cases like those of Salomé Aranda and María Belén Bernal have sparked national outrage. These incidents have intensified public demands for justice and reform. Domestic violence in Ecuador is not only a human rights concern but also a reflection of ongoing struggles to ensure accountability, safety, and dignity for women across the country.

== Historical milestones ==
=== 1979–1981 ===
The Convention on the Elimination of All Forms of Discrimination against Women (CEDAW) was adopted by the United Nations General Assembly on December 18, 1979, signed by Ecuador on July 17, 1980, and was approved and came into force in 1981 during the presidency of Osvaldo Hurtado Larrea.The first report was sent in 1982 and since that date, every four or five reports have been submitted; the most recent one was delivered in 2020. Feminist organizations throughout the nation assume and active role in ensuring the State's compliance with its obligations towards women.

=== 1993–2002 ===
The World Conference on Human Rights (WCHR) was held in Vienna, Austria in 1993. As a result of this meeting, the Vienna Declaration and Program of Action emerged, along with a series of specific recommendations to promote and protect the rights of women, children and Indigenous people. This included taking special attention around the issue of gender based violence against women as a public matter within the international political agenda.

The Convention of Belém do Pará was adopted in 1994, which acknowledges that women have the right to live without violence, defines acts of violence against them, and highlights that such violence infringes upon human rights and essential freedoms. During the same year, the first women's police stations were created in Ecuador. This Convention gives primary importance to the protection of women's right and to ensuring that women live in a world free from violence, in the public and private spheres.In addition, violence is recognized as any act that threatens women's integrity, freedom, security and dignity and, therefore, as a problem that requires the urgent involvement of governments. States are urged to implement policies, laws, programs, as well as to monitor them, to prevent, address, and sanction the different forms of violence that women experience in everyday life.

The Law N° 103, or "Ley contra la violencia a la mujer y la familia" (Law against violence toward Women and the Family) was approved on November 29, 1995, and published in Ecuador on December 11 on the same year under the Official Registry N°839. This law conceptualized the notion of "domestic violence", established protective measures for people who have experienced violence and set out procedures for judging those who commit acts of aggression. A key aspect of this regulation, and a milestone in the country's legislation on gender-based violence, is that it made explicit for the first time the responsibility of health and national security personnel. In case police officers and health professionals working in public or private center or hospital realized a women they are attending is suffering violence, they have the obligation to report it within a maximum period of 48 hours after becoming aware of the incident.

In 1995, the Beijing Declaration and Platform for Action was adopted, marking a significant milestone in global efforts to advance gender equality and women's rights. Later that year, in November, Ecuador enacted the "Law Against Violence Toward Women and the Family," also known as Law 103. This law established the state's responsibility to intervene through the justice system to address and combat violence against women and families.

El Protocolo de Palermo (Palermo Protocol), was adopted on November 15 in 2000. It was the result of the 1998 recommendation of the Commission on Crime Prevention and Criminal Justice and the Economic and Social Council and the agreements reached in the Convention against Transnational Organized Crime. It was signed in the city of Palermo, Italy and developed between January 1999 and October 2000. This Protocol is an international law enforcement tool in the process of combating human trafficking. It seeks to prevent, suppress and punish trafficking in person and focuses particularly on women and children, due to its prevalence and who hare particularly vulnerable to this type of crime.

=== 2003–2011 ===
The "Reglamento a ley para contra la violencia a la mujer y la familia" (The Regulations to the Law against Violence towards Women and the Family) entered into force in 2004 as a guide to protect the physical, psychological, and sexual integrity of women and other members of the family unit. Additionally, it seeks to address domestic violence by outlining a series of judicial procedures intended to be applied in situations occurring in the private sphere. At the same time, it describes a range of protective measures to safeguard the assaulted party and prevent further acts of violence inside the home, and set out legal procedures for responding to cases of aggression.

The Ecuadorian State, through Decree 620 on September 10, 2007, established the construction of the National Plan for the Eradication of Gender-Based Violence against girls, boys, adolescents, and women (2007-2010). As part of this plan, strategic pillars were included, such as the transformation of sociocultural patterns, the construction and strengthening of the comprehensive protection system, access to justice – institutional framework, and the construction and implementation of a registration system.

On October 20, 2008, the new Constitution of the Republic established priority, preferential, and specialized care in which older adults, children, adolescents, pregnant women, people with disabilities, prisoners, and those suffering from catastrophic or high-complexity diseases will receive prioritized and specialized care in both public and private sectors. Similarly, priority care will be given to individuals in risky situations, victims of domestic and sexual violence, child abuse, and those affected by natural or man-made disasters. The State will provide special protection to individuals facing double vulnerability

On 2011, The National Council for Gender Equality, the National Institute of Statistics and Censuses, and the Ministry of the Interior conducted the first National Survey on Family Relationships and Gender-Based Violence Against Women in 2011. This survey examines the various forms of violence (physical, psychological, sexual, and economic) that women have experienced throughout their lives, in both public and private spheres, as well as their awareness of or search for services and avenues for justice.

=== 2012–2020 ===
In 2014, to promote more equitable justice, several reforms were made to the Comprehensive Organic Penal Code (COIP) in Ecuador, femicide and discrimination were classified as a criminal offense. Sanctions were established for violence against women or members of the family unit, and the violation of privacy was also classified as a crime.

In January 2018, the National Assembly of Ecuador approved the Comprehensive Organic Law to Prevent and Eradicate Violence against Women, which came into effect upon its publication in the Official Register No. 175 in February of the same year. This law is applicable throughout the entire national territory and to all women residing in the country. Its primary goal is to prevent and eliminate all forms of violence against women through four key areas: prevention, care, protection, and redress.

In 2019, the second National Survey on Gender-Based Violence against Women was conducted. Unlike the 2011 survey, the 2019 version provided a more in-depth investigation into violence by type and in each area. The methodological and operational structure of the survey was updated with new regulatory and conceptual frameworks, allowing for more accurate and comprehensive data. The 2019 survey not only examines violence experienced by women throughout their lives, but also focuses on incidents in the past 12 months. It also introduced new topics, including gynecological-obstetric violence, and made a preliminary attempt to study cyber violence and political violence.

== Extent and social views ==
The extent of domestic violence is difficult to estimate, due to differing definitions of abuse and due to problems with self reporting in studies.

Data from the 2004 survey with the collaboration between the Pan American Health Organization and the Centers for Disease Control and Prevention, with technical input from MEASURE DHS, ICF International reveal l:

- 32.4% of the women interviewed aged 15–49 said they had suffered physical or sexual violence by a current or former partner.
- 38.2% of the women interviewed justified wife beating in certain circumstances. The most common reason for justification was when the wife "is or is suspected of being unfaithful" with 29.9% of women justifying wife beating in this situation.

Data from the 2011 Survey on Family Relations and Gender-Based Violence against Women, carried out in Ecuador, reveal that female population aged 15 and older:

- 1 in 2 women (48.7%) have experienced some form of aggression from the men with whom they have or had an intimate or romantic relationship. Psychological aggression is the most frequently reported, affecting 43.4% of women, followed by physical aggression at 35%.
- At least 1 in 4 women reported that the aggression from their husbands, boyfriends, or partners occurred very frequently—regardless of the type of violence—whether physical (22.5%), psychological (27.9%), sexual (27.4%), or economic (31.6%).
- 47.4% of the women who experienced abuse identified it as male jealousy the main trigger behind violent behavior by a partner.

Data from the 2019 Survey on Family Relations and Gender-Based Violence against Women, carried out in Ecuador, reveal that female population aged 15 and older:

- 65 out of every 100 women have experienced some form of violence at some point in their lives.
- Over the course of their lives, 43 out of every 100 women in Ecuador have experienced some form of violence at the hands of their partner. Psychological aggression is the most frequently reported, affecting 40.8% of women, followed by physical aggression at 25%.
- 57 out of every 100 women believe that women should behave and dress modestly in order to avoid provoking men.

=== Femicide ===
The femicide rate in Ecuador has been increasing over the past decade, reaching a peak of 332 reported femicides in 2022 and staying relatively high ever since. Although Ecuador's rate of 1.2 femicides per 100,000 women is lower than the United States (which in 2023 reported a femicide rate 2.6 per 100,000 women), a 2017 study published in the Qualitative Sociology Review found that Ecuadorian women often under reported abuse because they do not trust Ecuador’s legal institutions; thus, it is largely considered that for crimes such as domestic violence, Ecuadorian men “are able to act with impunity.”

According to the 2022 report on femicides in Ecuador by the Asociación Latinomericana para el Desarrollo Alternativo (ALDEA), the vast majority of perpetrators have an existing relationship with the victim.

- 72% had a current or previous romantic relationship
- 9% had a familial relationship
- 15% had no past or present relationship of any kind

=== Awareness campaigns ===
In 2010, the Transitional Commission to the National Council for Women and Gender Equality decided to scale up the campaign "Reacciona Ecuador, el machismo es violencia" (React, Ecuador — Machismo is Violence) The initiative aimed to deliver a clear and direct call to break away from the social and cultural inertia that normalized machismo. As part of this effort, an audiovisual production was created, including television and radio ads. These pieces were notable for presenting the issue of machismo in an uncommon and striking way, conveying powerful messages that illustrated gender inequality and the violent treatment many women endure.

In 2013, the “Ecuador actúa ya. Violencia de género, ni más” (Ecuador Acts Now: No More Gender-Based Violence) campaign was launched under the leadership of the Ministry of the Interior. The initiative focused specifically on violence against children and adolescents. During the first quarter of 2014, the campaign was broadcast across television networks and shown in movie theaters throughout the country. It featured four public service announcements addressing different forms of abuse, including physical and sexual violence, general violence, and peer-to-peer aggression.

In 2022, the campaign "¡Rompe el silencio!, llama al 9-1-1" (Break the Silence! Call 9-1-1) was launched as part of a national effort to combat domestic violence. This initiative, led by Ecuador’s ECU-911 emergency response system, aims to raise public awareness by sharing messages through its official communication channels. The campaign encourages citizens to take an active role in preventing and reporting domestic abuse. Its core message urges people to take action if they witness violence in their neighborhoods, families, or social circles.

== Legal treatment ==
Although prohibited by law, domestic violence in Ecuador is widespread, identified as a pervasive issue and its prevalence remains high, while case resolution rates continue to be low. Testimonies from both survivors and justice system professionals highlight the urgent need for improved training of officials and the allocation of sufficient resources to the institutions responsible for enforcing the law. Cultural and social barriers still pose major obstacles to reporting abuse and ensuring effective intervention.

Evaluations of public policies indicate that, although there are some promising prevention programs and victim support services in place, their impact varies significantly depending on the region and the availability of resources. Awareness campaigns have contributed to shifting certain public attitudes, but a sustained effort is still needed to challenge and dismantle the deep-rooted cultural norms that perpetuate domestic violence.

Family courts can impose fines for domestic violence, and have the power to remove an abusive spouse from the home. Ecuador has created specialized judicial units under the Ministry of Justice, with judges specializing in family violence. Serious cases of abuse can be referred to the Office of the Public Prosecutor for prosecution.

The Judicial Council expanded judicial coverage. There were 357 judges with the authority to oversee and resolve these cases, including 115 who are specialized in this area.Across the country, 173 judicial units handle cases of violence against women and family members—39 are specialized units, and 134 have general jurisdiction. Additionally, 240 professionals, including doctors, psychologists, and social workers, form technical teams that offer support services to victims.

Between 2014 and 2023, Ecuador’s Judicial Council recorded 498,344 cases of violence against women or family members. However, only 31.63% of these (157,689 cases) resulted in a formal sentence, leaving over 340,000 cases unresolved. Notably, 51.32% of the rulings issued were acquittals, suggesting that a significant number of complaints did not lead to sanctions. This may reflect a broader issue within the judicial system, such as a lack of understanding or sensitivity to the power imbalances and coercive dynamics that often characterize gender-based violence.

La Ley Contra la Violencia a la Mujer y la Familia (Law on Violence against Women and the Family) is Ecuador's principal law dealing with domestic violence. In addition, a new Criminal Code came into force in 2014, which also addresses domestic violence.

- Sexual abuse laws list a minimum punishment of 3 years and a maximum punishment of 10 years in prison.
- Rape laws list a minimum punishment of 19 years and a maximum punishment of 26 years in prison.

== Intersection with the Ecuadorian state ==
There have been a couple of highly publicized cases of domestic violence in Ecuador in the past 10 years, a number of which have been complicated by law enforcement either inhibiting the investigation process or directly perpetrating the crime. Even when law enforcement does investigate these crimes, the Ecuadorian protocol for investigating domestic violence—and gendered-violence as a whole—often revictimizes the person who has reported the crime.

=== Activism at the intersection ===
==== Salomé Aranda ====
One high-profile case of domestic abuse occurred in October 2020, when an indigenous activist, Salomé Aranda, “responded” to the chronic abuse of her partner, Abel Vargas. Aranda’s defense resulted in her arrest because Vargas reported her to the police. In the investigation, both parties were found to have been physically harmed, but there was no evaluation of their mental well-being. Aranda received an expedited sentence of 10 days, following the guidelines of Ecuador’s Comprehensive Organic Criminal Code. Aranda maintained that she was not being tried fairly.

Those defending Aranda claim that the Ecuadorian justice system’s treatment of her during this process violated her constitutional rights to liberty because it did not take into account her specific identity as an indigenous woman and her lower socio-economic status. Additionally, in support of Aranda, Amnesty International wrote, we are “concerned about the lack of progress in relation to the attacks and threats that Salomé Aranda faced for her work to defend human rights related to the environment.” The attacks referred to here are from May 2018 when Salomé Aranda and her family were physically attacked and threatened while in their home because of her involvement with the Amazonian Women collective. Aranda and three other members of Amazonian Women faced a series of violence and threats of violence following their protests defending indigenous territories from the expansion of oil fields. All four women filed a complaint with the police, but the investigations into the attackers’ identities were never conclusive. In response to this, Erika Guevara-Rosas, the Americas Director at Amnesty International, says that “Despite the promises of [the Ecuadorian] government, the lack of will to seriously investigate these attacks against human rights defenders and provide them with adequate protection sends a clear message to society: that these crimes are tolerated in Ecuador.”

==== María Belén Bernal ====
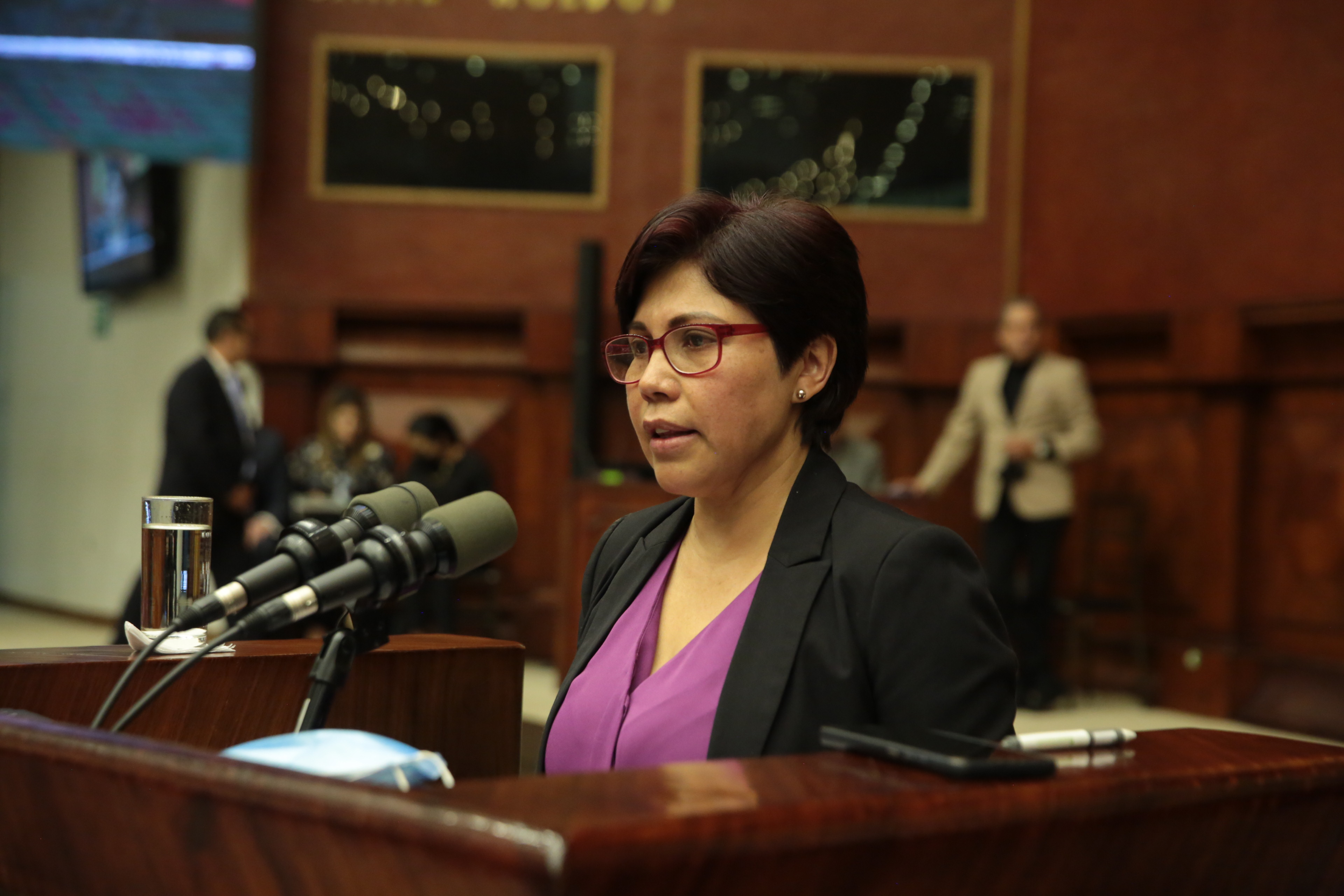
Appearance of Mrs. Elizabeth Otavalo Paredes, mother of citizen María Belén Bernal Otavalo (+) at Session No. 799 of the Plenary Session of the National Assembly

Another high-profile case of femicide occurred on September 21, 2022, when the body of lawyer María Belén Bernal was found 5 km from a police facility in Quito where her husband, police lieutenant Germán Cáceres, was working. At the time of her death, Bernal was 34; she and Cáceres had been together for 6 years. Bernal was a criminal defense lawyer and a mother to a 12-year-old son from a previous relationship. Bernal was murdered by Cáceres 10 days prior, on September 11, when she had visited him at the police facility where he was in charge of training young officers. Although multiple people in the building reported hearing a woman’s screams from his room, Cáceres was allowed to come and go from the building freely in the days after. Two days after Bernal had last been seen, Cáceres formally reported that she was missing. Cáceres was questioned on September 14, but he disappeared after his interview, triggering a nationwide manhunt. When he was found and brought into custody three months later, he was adamant that he was the sole perpetrator of this femicide. Cáceres was sentenced to 34 years in prison.

In the weeks following the discovery of Bernal’s body, protests took place in cities around Ecuador

calling for an end to femicide. To feminist activists, and to Bernal’s own mother, Bernal’s murder was not only a matter of domestic violence but also an example of how Ecuador’s justice system fails to protect women from gender-based violence. In this case, it was a state agent who was the perpetrator of such harm. The women who protested, carried signs with messages like "Ni Una Menos" or "Vivas Nos Queremos" which translated are "Not one less" and "We want each other alive" respectively. News outlets report that hundreds of women protesting outside of the National Police Headquarters in Quito joined together in the chant: “What does it take to be a policeman? To be a murderer by night and by day!”

==== Social media and relevance today ====
The slogans "Ni Una Menos" and "Viva Nos Queremos" are still prominent hashtags for Ecuadorian activists against gender-based violence, now joined by the hashtag “#BastaDeImpunidad” translated to "#StopImpunity" as the role of the Ecuadorian government is increasingly scrutinized. Violence against women remains a stringent issue in Ecuador today; ALDEA reports that 27 of the femicides committed in 2024 took place after domestic violence had been reported to the police or restraining orders had been filed. In the same report, ALDEA warns that femicides in Ecuador seem to be on the rise as 40 femicides occurred in the month of January alone.

== See also ==
- Women in Ecuador
- Crime in Ecuador
