= Sociedad Feminista Luz del Pichincha =

Sociedad Feminista Luz del Pichincha (Light of Pichincha Feminist Society), was a women's organization in Ecuador, founded in 1922.

It played a pioneering role in the organized women's movement in Ecuador, where the women's movement was not strong and developed slowly.

It was founded by the pioneering feminists María Angélica Idrobo and Zoila Ugarte de Landívar, editor of the pioneering women's magazine La Mujer (1905), who became its first chairperson. The organization supported and worked for women's right to higher education, financial independence and right to vote, founded a school and an evening school and worked for prison reform for women.

In 1930, the organization, under Ugarte, invidted Spanish feminists to speek at the Instituto Nacional Mejía in Quito, and toured the country to speek on women's rights.

In 1929, women's suffrage was finally introduced in Ecuador. The leading place of the Sociedad Feminista was thereafter somewhat replaced by the Alianza Femenina Ecuatoriana, which was founded in 1938 to educate women about their new rights.
