= La Vicentina =

District of Quito, Ecuador

Coordinates: 0°13′4.2″S 78°29′21.2″W

La Vicentina is an electoral parish (Spanish: parroquia electoral urbana) or district of Quito, Ecuador. It was established as a result of the October 2004 political elections, when the city was divided into nineteen urban electoral parishes. Obelisco de la Vicentina is also located here.
