= Hipatia Cárdenas de Bustamante =

Ecuadorian writer, politician, suffragist and feminist

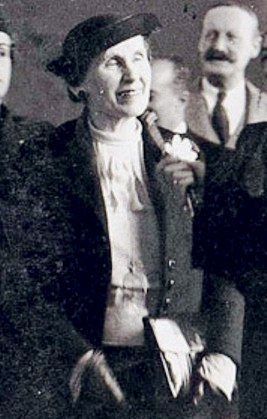
- Hipatia Cárdenas, 1938
- Born: March 23, 1889; Quito, Ecuador
- Died: February 9, 1972 (aged 82); Quito, Ecuador
- Other names: Aspacia
- Occupation: Writer
- Spouse: José Rafael Bustamante

Hipatia Cárdenas de Bustamante (also known by her pseudonym Aspacia) (1889–1972) was an Ecuadorian writer, politician, suffragist, and feminist.

== Biography ==
Cárdenas was born in Quito on March 23, 1889 to politician and legal expert Alejandro Cárdenas and to Ana Navarro Nájera.

Together with Zoila Ugarte de Landívar (1864-1969), Cárdenas was one of the pioneers fighting for women's suffrage in Ecuador. In 1929, she became the first female state councilor, and in 1932, she was the first female presidential candidate.

She fought for the continued right for women's suffrage after controversy following the establishment of women's suffrage in 1929. In 1943, she published Gold, red and blue'; she also worked for El Día, El Comercio, and the magazine América.

Cárdenas died in Quito on February 9, 1972.
