= Obelisco de la Vicentina =

Monument in Quito, Ecuador

- Interactive map of Obelisco de la Vicentina
- 0°12′55″S 78°29′14″W
- Location: Itchimbia, Quito, Ecuador

History
- Built: 1951
- Built for: Monument

The Obelisco de la Vicentina is a monument built in 1951 located in the La Vicentina neighborhood of Quito, Ecuador. It's considered one of La Vicentina's best-known landmarks.
