= María Angélica Idrobo =

Ecuadorian writer and feminist activist

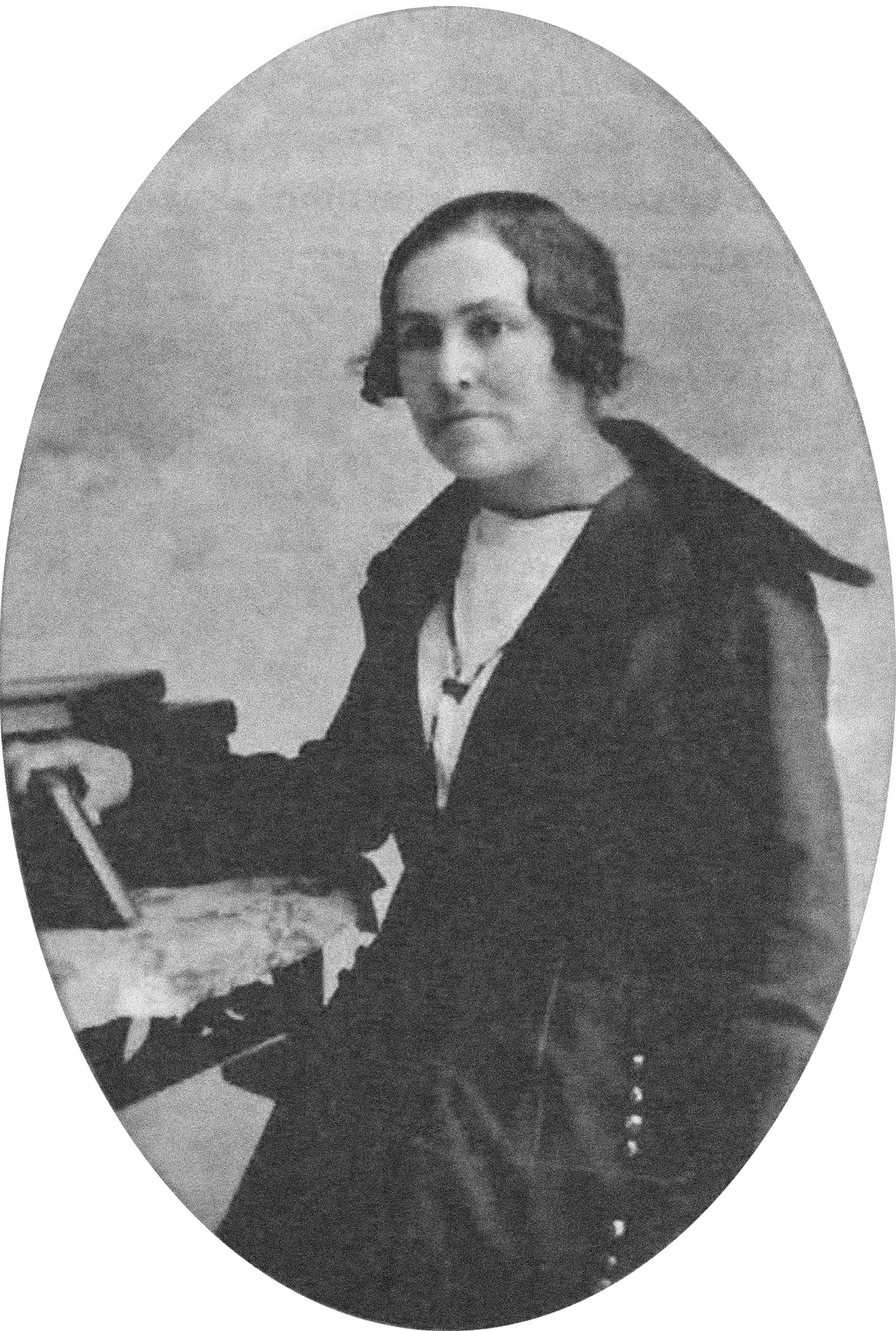
A photograph of María Angélica Idrobo.

María Angélica Idrobo (July 29, 1890 – February 26, 1956) was an Ecuadorian writer and feminist activist.

== Biography ==
María Angélica Idrobo was born in 1890 in Otavalo canton in the province of Imbabura, Ecuador. Her surname is also sometimes spelled Hidrovo or Idrovo.

Idrobo stood out as a student at an early age, and she received a scholarship to a normal school, which trained women to become teachers, in Quito.

After graduating, she dedicated herself to teaching, becoming experienced in pedagogy and receiving further scholarships to train in Argentina and Uruguay. She settled permanently in Quito and founded several schools, including Ariel de Guayaquil, Fernández Madrid, and Simón Bolívar, and she also worked as the rector of the Manuela Cañizares Normal School, shaping its curriculum for many years. She was a firm defender of secularism in education.

Beyond her teaching career, Idrobo was also a pioneering women's rights activist. Along with her colleague Zoila Ugarte, she founded the Sociedad Feminista Luz de Pichincha, a feminist organization, in 1922. She also served as president of the organization and was heavily involved in the Alianza Femenina Ecuatoriana, serving as the group's secretary of education for two years. She focused on the importance of education for women and argued that women should be welcomed into the country's intellectual circles.

Idrobo also distinguished herself as a writer. She contributed to various publications including La Nación, and in 1934 she collaborated on the founding of Revista Alas, a feminist magazine. Her most important publication is considered to be the childcare manual Homenaje a la Madre, first published in 1934.

Idrobo remained single throughout her life. She died in Quito in 1956. Multiple schools have been named in her honor, and in 1960 a bust of her was installed in Quito.

== Selected works ==
- Homenaje a la Madre (1934)
