= Human trafficking in Ecuador =

Ecuador ratified the 2000 UN TIP Protocol in September 2002.

Victims of human trafficking in Ecuador are generally women and children trafficked within the country from border and central highland areas to urban centers for commercial sexual exploitation, as well as for involuntary domestic servitude, forced begging, and forced labor in mines and other hazardous work. Ecuador prohibits human trafficking in its penal code, and penalties are commensurate with other serious crimes. Despite robust law enforcement efforts to combat trafficking, conviction rates remain low. The Ecuadorian government has ensured trafficking victims' access to legal, medical, psychological, and shelter services, in large part through its partnership with a network of NGOs. The government has also undertaken advertising campaigns against human trafficking, particularly child labor and child sex tourism.

The U.S. State Department's Office to Monitor and Combat Trafficking in Persons placed the country in "Tier 2" in 2017 and 2023.

In 2023, the Organised Crime Index noted the high level of human trafficking in the country.

== Incidence in 2010 ==
Ecuador was a source, transit, and destination country for men, women, and children subjected to trafficking in persons, specifically forced prostitution and forced labor. The majority of trafficking victims were believed to be women and children trafficked within the country from border and central highland areas to urban centers for commercial sexual exploitation, as well as for involuntary domestic servitude, forced begging, and forced labor in mines and other hazardous work. There were also reports of Ecuadorian children being forced to engage in criminal activity, such as drug trafficking and robbery. Parents sometimes sent their children to neighboring countries in order to earn money, and Ecuadorian children were found in conditions of forced labor in Colombia, Venezuela, Chile, and the Dominican Republic, particularly as domestic servants, forced vendors, and beggars. Ecuadorian women were subjected to forced prostitution in Colombia, Peru, Venezuela, and Western Europe. To a lesser extent, Ecuador was a destination country for Colombian, Peruvian, and Chinese women and girls in forced prostitution. Indigenous Ecuadorians were vulnerable to forced labor in domestic servitude. Child sex tourism occurs mostly in urban areas, and in tourist destinations, such as Tena and the Galapagos Islands. Ecuador was a transit country for Chinese nationals smuggled to destinations elsewhere in the Western Hemisphere; some of these migrants were trafficked.

== Prosecution (2010) ==
Ecuador prohibits all forms of human trafficking in Article 190 of its penal code, amended in 2005; trafficking for the purpose of labor exploitation carries a punishment of six to nine years' imprisonment, and trafficking for sexual exploitation carries a penalty of eight to 12 years' imprisonment. Penalties for human trafficking may be increased, by aggravating circumstances, to a maximum of 35 years' imprisonment. Such penalties are commensurate with those prescribed for other serious crimes, such as rape. Other statutes, such as Article 528.13, which prohibits the commercial sexual exploitation of children, are also used to prosecute human trafficking crimes.

Despite reports of trafficking-related corruption, particularly related to civil registry officials issuing false identity documents to children, no investigations, prosecutions, or convictions of potentially complicit officials took place last year. According to Ecuadorian police, brothel owners commonly use false identity documents to exploit children in prostitution, and to avoid criminal liability for immigration and trafficking violations in the event of a police raid.

Most cases of human trafficking investigated in Ecuador during 2009 involved forced prostitution, particularly of children. A growing number of investigations are related to labor exploitation of children and adults, but do not appear commensurate with the incidence of forced labor in the country, particularly the large number of children exploited for forced begging and forced domestic work. The government has provided police specializing in crimes against children with specific training on trafficking in persons. Ecuadorian authorities have formed partnerships with Colombian, Venezuelan, U.S., and Chinese officials to jointly investigate several trafficking cases.

== Protection (2010) ==
The Ecuadorian government has ensured trafficking victims' access to legal, medical, psychological, and shelter services, in large part through its partnership with a network of NGOs that received funding from the government and international organizations. Women and girls are eligible for shelter services, while the government provides boys and men with victim services on an ad hoc basis, though shelters for trafficking victims remain lacking in parts of the country. Foreign victims are eligible for the same services as Ecuadorian trafficking victims. In addition to these short-term services, the government provides victims with counseling, protection, job training, and educational training, and ensures that child victims received long-term care as needed. Through its Victim and Witness Protection Program, the Ecuadorian government operates specialized police units in the cities of Guayaquil, Machala, Portoviejo, Cuenca, and Quito. These units accompany other police authorities on brothel raids to coordinate immediate protective services toward identified trafficking victims, and assistance for victim witnesses during court proceedings. The government encourages victims to assist with the investigation and prosecution of trafficking offenders. While Ecuadorian authorities have conducted raids on establishments to rescue children in prostitution, according to the U.S. government they did not demonstrate adequate efforts to identify adult trafficking victims among women exploited in brothels and other vulnerable populations. In 2009, police removed 33 children from commercial sexual exploitation and five from conditions of forced labor. Authorities did not penalize identified trafficking victims for unlawful acts committed as a direct result of their being trafficked. The Ecuadorian government does not provide legal alternatives to the removal of foreign victims to countries where they face hardship or retribution, though foreign victims are not typically deported from the country. The government provides victim services to repatriated Ecuadorian trafficking victims. Ecuadorian authorities have developed trafficking in persons protocols for consular officers abroad and have begun training their diplomatic corps in these procedures.

== Prevention (2010) ==
The Ecuadorian government has undertaken vigorous public awareness campaigns against child forced labor and prostitution. The government has forged partnerships with private telecommunications companies and a bank to combat child labor, in part through a network of schools for former child laborers. During December 2009, the government launched a national campaign against child begging and a radio soap opera series about the dangers of forced labor, which was broadcast on provincial radio stations in Spanish and Kichwa, a local language. State-owned radio stations have also donated airtime to an NGO in the highlands to broadcast messages on how to identify and avoid human trafficking situations. The Ecuadorian Ministry of Tourism has launched a nationwide campaign to prevent the commercial sexual exploitation of children in the tourism industry, and the government has continued a multimedia campaign in 20 departments to encourage citizens to identify and report trafficking cases.
