= El Guabo, Ecuador =

El Guabo
- Town
- Location within Ecuador
- Coordinates: 3.24505°S 79.83143°W
- Country: Ecuador
- Province: El Oro
- Canton: El Guabo Canton

Area
  - Town: 4.94 km^{2} (1.91 sq mi)

Population (2022 census)
  - Town: 26,635
  - Density: 5,390/km^{2} (14,000/sq mi)

El Guabo is a town in El Oro, one of the provinces of Ecuador. It is the seat of El Guabo Canton, located a few kilometers from the provincial capital, Machala. The town has a bypass, so cars coming mainly from Guayaquil or Naranjal can drive towards Machala without passing it.
