= El Guabo Canton =

- Canton
- Location of El Oro Province in Ecuador.

- El Guabo Canton in El Oro Province
- Coordinates: 3.2388°S 79.8292°W
- Country: Ecuador
- Province: El Oro Province

Area
  - Total: 580.2 km^{2} (224.0 sq mi)

Population (2022 census)
  - Total: 59,536
  - Density: 102.6/km^{2} (265.8/sq mi)
- Time zone: UTC-5 (ECT)

The Guabo is a canton in the province of El Oro in Ecuador. Its capital is the city cantonal Guabo. Its population in the 2010 census was 50,009 inhabitants. The date of canton of El Guabo was September 7, 1978. The mayor for the period 2009-2014 was John Franco Aguilar.

== Geographic Location ==
The Guabo is located in the north of the province of El Oro, has an area of 580.2 km^{2}, at a distance of 18 km from Machala capital of the province. To the north the canton Orangery (Canton), south to the cantons Machala and Pasaje Canton, east to the Canton Ponce Enriquez and Pasaje Canton, and west by the Pacific Ocean, Gulf of Guayaquil. The canton is located in the coastal region with a tropical humid climate, in which the most important crop is bananas for export.

== Demographics ==
Ethnic groups as of the Ecuadorian census of 2010:

- Mestizo 82.3%
- Afro-Ecuadorian 6.9%
- White 6.0%
- Montubio 4.0%
- Indigenous 0.7%
- Other 0.2%

== Political division ==
The Guabo is divided into five parishes: The Guabo (cantonal) Bourbons (Sucre) The Iberia Tendales (heads in Puerto Tendales) Rio Bonito Works of Mr. John Franco called: The Linear Park course is not a straight line.

== Guabo Colleges ==
- National Joint College Dr. Jose Maria Velasco Ibarra
- National Joint College Dr. Jose Miguel Garcia Moreno
- College Night "The Guabo"
- Latin American Private College
- Mora Private College Quinonez
- Ati II Private College Pillahuaso
