= National Library of Ecuador =

- Biblioteca Nacional del Ecuador Eugenio Espejo
- 0.21607996174671323°S 78.49906124668672°W
- Location: Quito, Ecuador
- Established: 25 May 1792

The National Library of Ecuador (Spanish: Biblioteca Nacional del Ecuador "Eugenio Espejo") is located in Quito, Ecuador. The library is named after the writer and lawyer Eugenio Espejo.

In 1859, an earthquake destroyed the library.

== See also ==
- List of national and state libraries
