= Assassination of Omar Menéndez =

2023 murder in Puerto López, Ecuador

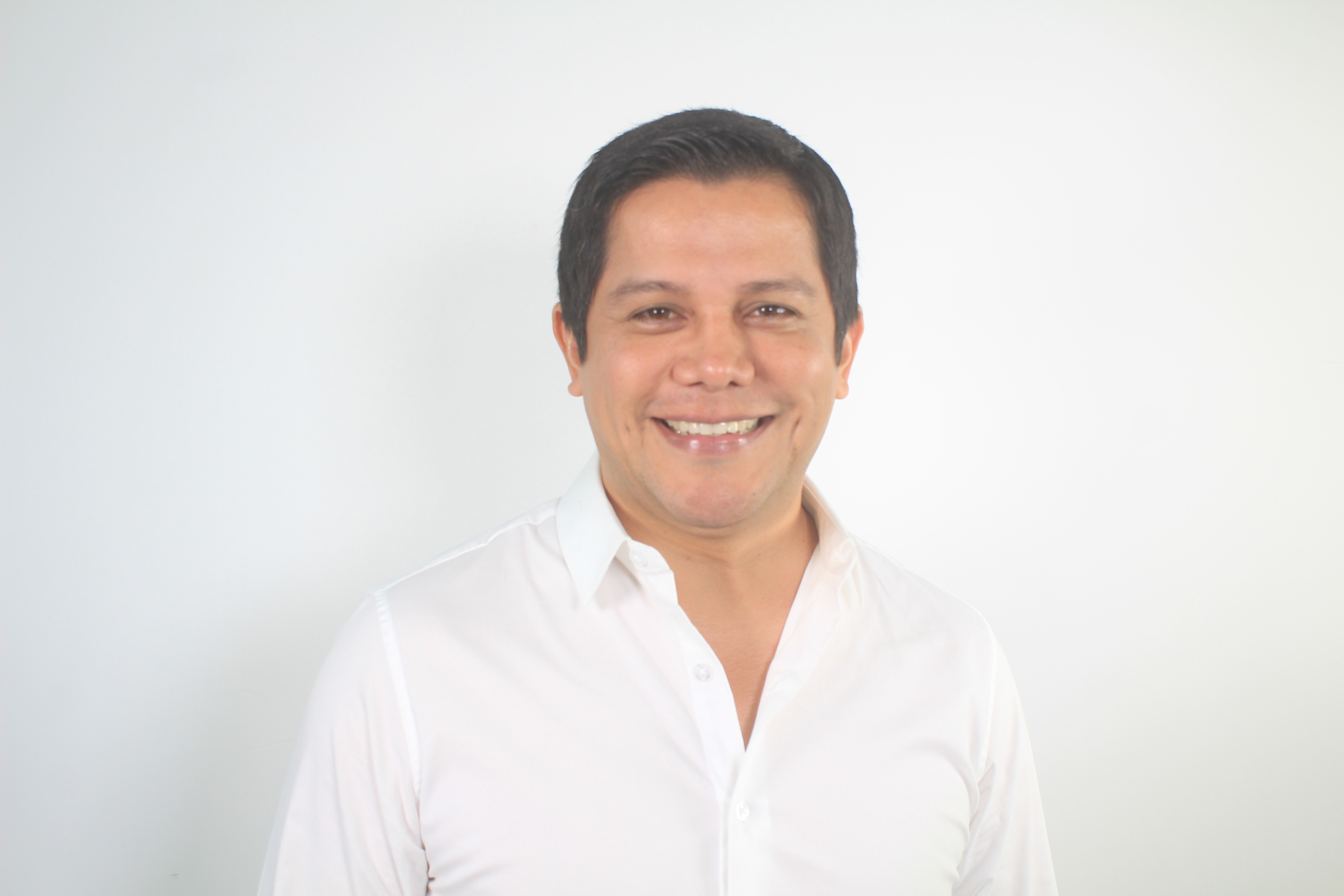
- Omar Menéndez in 2022

- Assassination of Omar Menéndez (Ecuador)
- Location: 01°33′39″S 80°48′42″W; Puerto López, Manabí Province, Ecuador
- Date: 4 February 2023; 3 years ago Circa 8 PM (UTC−5)
- Target: Omar Menéndez
- Attack type: Assassination by shooting
- Deaths: 2 (including Menéndez)
- Injuries: 2
- Perpetrator: Unknown

On 4 February 2023, Omar Menéndez, a 41-year-old Ecuadorian man who was running as the Citizen Revolution Movement party's candidate for mayor in the canton of Puerto López, Manabí Province in the 2023 Ecuadorian local elections, was shot and killed by two unidentified men just a few hours before the ballots were officially opened. Three other people were injured in the same shooting, including a 16-year-old volunteer, who eventually died from complications after being taken to the hospital.

Menéndez was one of the several candidates targeted by violent attacks in the run-up to the elections, which were held alongside the 2023 Ecuadorian constitutional referendum and in the midst of an escalating wave of crime and violence across Ecuador, mainly linked to the then ongoing nationwide security crisis and the growing influence of criminal organizations with connections to drug trafficking in the country.

Despite his assassination, Menéndez would go on to win the election posthumously, becoming the mayor of Puerto López. As for Article 112 of the Code of Democracy, the regional office of the Citizen Revolution Movement was allowed to indicate a new candidate to replace him: Verónica Lucas Marcillo was chosen to step in to fill the post on behalf of Menéndez, and would eventually be sworn in as the new mayor of the canton on 14 May 2023.

== Background ==
=== Social-political scenario ===
Menéndez's assassination took place in the context of the 2023 Ecuadorian local elections, which were held on 5 February 2023, alongside the 2023 Ecuadorian constitutional referendum, called by President Guillermo Lasso. The campaign period for both the voting sessions was marred by the consequences of an escalating wave of violence across Ecuador, which was mainly linked to the rise of drug trafficking-associated criminal organizations in the country. As a result of conflicts between the aforementioned organizations, since 2021 Ecuador had gone through a nationwide security crisis, which stemmed from a series of violent clashes and riots in penitentiaries across the nation and manifested itself outside of prisons, as well, causing a sharp rise in the country's overall murder rate.

Lasso, originally elected as President in April 2021, aimed to tackle the rising crime wave through one of the eight changes to the constitution proposed in the referendum, which would legalize the extradition of Ecuadorian citizens involved in criminal activities related to international organized crime, including drug trafficking itself, whether they were facing a trial abroad or they were already sentenced in absentia. The proposal sparked debate and criticism, although several sources noted that neighboring Colombia already had a similar law in place since 1997, with officials from the country stating that narcotraffickers might often see an extradition to maximum security jails in the United States as a particularly harsh punishment, and one they should avoid by any means.

=== Violence during the elections ===
In the weeks preceding the local elections and the referendum, several prominent episodes of violence against local candidates were reported across the country.

On 20 December 2022, Javier Pincay, the Advance Party's candidate for mayor in Portoviejo, Manabí Province, survived a violent attack, having been shot down during a peaceful march with his supporters and subsequently going under surgery. On 9 January 2023, Richard Firmat, the Popular Unity Movement's candidate for mayor in Simón Bolívar, and one of his volunteers were left wounded in a shooting. Finally, on 22 January, Julio César Farachio, the Popular Unity Movement's candidate for mayor in Salinas, was shot and killed while hosting an electoral rally.

== Victim ==
Omar Menéndez, who was 41 at the time of his killing, was best known as an entrepreneur, who had lived in Guayaquil during his university studies before moving back to Puerto López around 2007, to take over Intercable, a local retail company specialized in IT and telecommunications and owned by his own family. He was married to Génesis Gonzáles, and the couple had two children.

After stepping down from his role at Intercable, on 1 August 2022 Menéndez had officially announced his candidacy for mayor of the canton of Puerto López in the 2023 Ecuadorian local elections, being nominated by the Citizen Revolution Movement, a left-wing political party led by former President Rafael Correa. He mainly centered his electoral campaign around security and industrial development: he proposed to install a video-surveillance system all across the canton, as well as raise funds for the Tourist Security branch of the National Police of Ecuador and support local seafood commerce.

Just a few hours before his assassination, Menéndez had posted several videos in support of his own campaign on his Facebook account.

== Assassination and aftermath ==
=== Shooting ===
According to the reconstructions of local police authorities, at around 8 PM (UTC−5) of 4 February 2023, two armed men on motorcycles arrived to an office building in Puerto López, and then ran up to the third floor of the complex, where Menéndez was working with volunteers to coordinate the last operations of his campaign before the ballots for the local elections were officially opened.

As soon as they burst into the room, the gunmen started shooting at the candidate and his collaborators, killing Menéndez on the spot and wounding three more people, before escaping immediately from the crime scene. The three injured people were all taken to the hospital, to receive emergency treatments: one of them, a 16-year-old volunteer, was pronounced dead later at the same night, due to complications.

Local police immediately opened an investigation on the murder, although no immediate arrests were made, due to the unknown identity of the two killers at the time. However, officers revealed that Menéndez had suffered an extortion attempt just a few days before being assassinated.

=== Reactions ===
The Citizen Revolution Movement, the party that had been supporting Menéndez during his campaign, confirmed his death on their official social media pages, denouncing the state of violence and turmoil surrounding the elections and asking institutions to open an investigation and find the perpetrators of the murder. The party's leader, Rafael Correa, who had been on voluntary exile in Belgium since 2017, followed suit by posting a message on his Twitter page. Another member of the same party, Marcela Aguiñaga, who was running for governor of the Guayas Province in the same election, also condemned the killing.

During the ceremony that opened the voting sessions for the 2023 Ecuadorian constitutional referendum, both President Guillermo Lasso and the president of the National Electoral Council, Diana Atamaint, condemned the assassination of Menéndez, with the latter urging the Public Ministry to investigate on the facts that "attacked the peace and the serenity of Ecuadorians, and attacked our democracy". Another counsellor of Lasso's government, Aparicio Caicedo, mourned the loss of the candidate, as well.

Finally, Menéndez's wife, Génesis Gonzáles, paid tribute to him by posting a message on her Facebook page.

== Election results ==
On 5 February 2023, the day after the assassination of Menéndez, the local elections in Puerto López took place as planned: according to the results shared by the National Electoral Council, the late candidate received 6958 votes (45.98% of the total preferences) across the towns of Machalilla, Puerto López and Salango, being elected posthumously as mayor of the canton.

As for Article 112 of the Code of Democracy, the regional office of the Citizen Revolution Movement was allowed to indicate a new candidate to replace the late Menéndez: shortly after the election's results were publicly shared, Verónica Lucas Marcillo was registered by the party as the newly-appointed mayor of Puerto López, as she was set to be officially sworn in on 14 May 2023.

== See also ==
- 2023 Ecuadorian local elections
- Crime in Ecuador
- Ecuadorian security crisis
- List of assassinations in Ecuador
