= Agua Blanca, Ecuador =

Coordinates: 1°32′S 80°44′W

Agua Blanca
- Commune
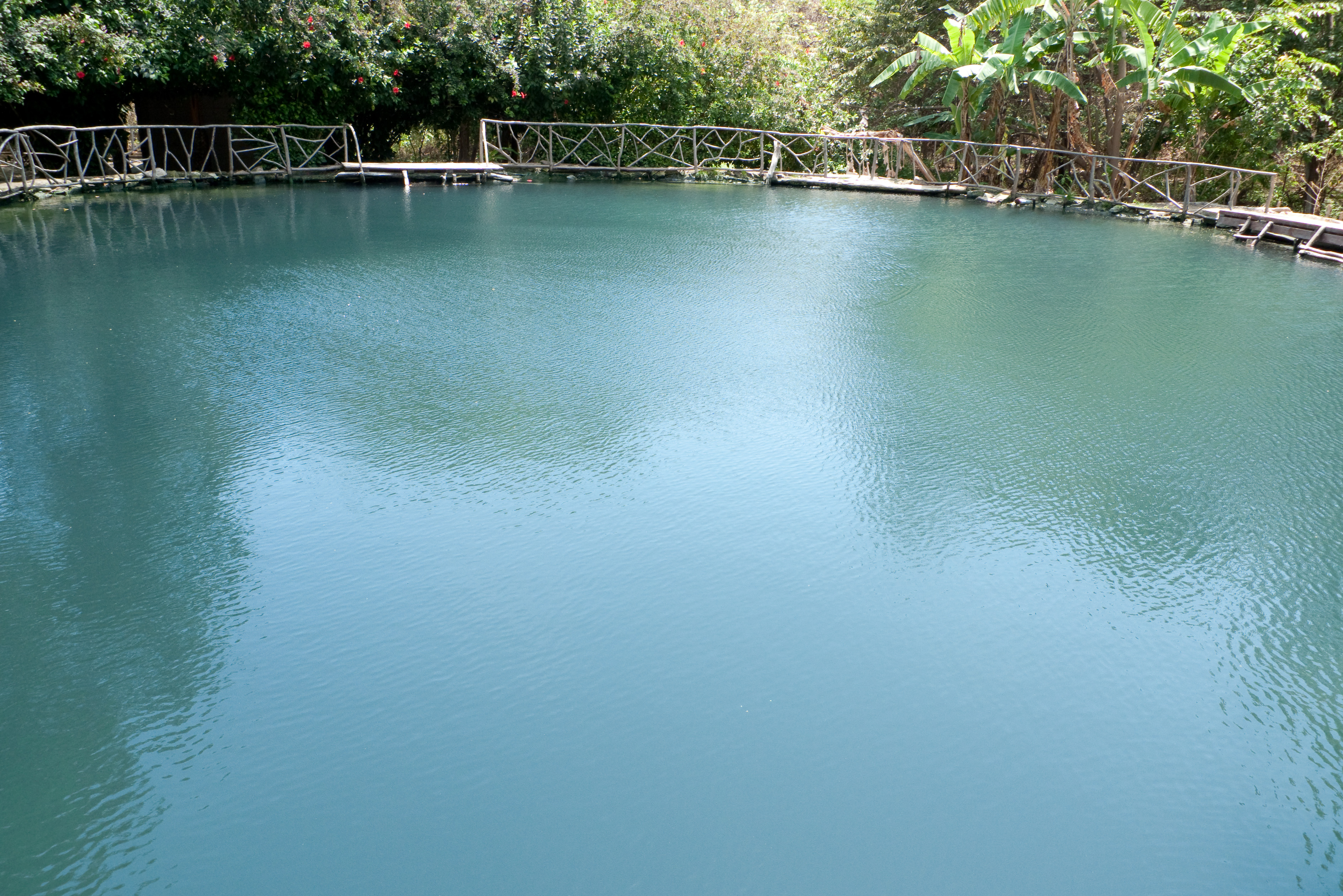
- The healing sulfurous waters of Agua Blanca
- Interactive map of Agua Blanca
- Country: Ecuador
- Province: Manabí
- Canton: Puerto López
- Parish: Machalilla
- Time zone: UTC-5 (ECT)

Agua Blanca is a commune in Machalilla Parish, Puerto López Canton, Manabí Province, Ecuador. It is east of the city of Puerto López.

The community has a small church and a museum in the center of the village. The church is fantastically painted in bright colours.

The area itself is in Machalilla National Park and it requires a small entry fee for tourists. The park is home to a sulphur lake which smells strongly of rotten eggs. The water and the underlying mud are extremely good for the skin because of the sulphur in deposits. Around the lake one frequently sees humming birds feeding at the flowers overhanging the water.
