= Machalilla =

Machalilla may refer to:

- Machalilla culture, an ancient culture/people in Ecuador
- Machalilla Parish, a rural parish of Puerto López Canton, Manabí Province
- Machalilla National Park, a national park around Machalilla Parish
