= Salango =

- Rural parish
- Location within Ecuador
- Coordinates: 01°35′40″S 80°50′30″W
- Country: Ecuador
- Province: Manabí
- Canton: Puerto López
- Time zone: UTC-5 (ECT)
- Climate: BWh
- Website: www.salango.com.ec
- Fuente: Comunicación Salango

Communidad Salango is a rural parish of Puerto López Canton, Manabí Province, Ecuador.

== Location and dimensions ==
- Elevation: 0–108 m
- Coordinates: 01°35′40″S 80°50′30″W
- Area: 2,536 hectares
- Province: Manabí
- Capital: Portoviejo
- Cantón: Puerto López
- Population: 3,200
- Location: North: Puerto Lopez - South: Guayas - East: Guayas - West: Pacific Ocean.
- Sector:641 km southwest of Quito, 251 km northeast of the city of Guayaquil.

== Description ==
Community venues Río Chico.

== Economy ==
Natural Resources: Fishery, Flora, Fauna Marina

Factory :Fishery.

Tourism: Whale watching, beach, museum, crafts, diving, ecotourism trails, snorkeling, trekking, scenic beauty, flora and fauna, cultural events, archaeology.

The Salango community has deep ancestral roots that represent about 5,000 years of history and culture.

== Worldview ==
Salango is a pre-Columbian settlement that is located at the southern end of a sandy cove on the south coast of the province of Manabi. Salango Island is located just off the coast.

The worldview of the people has been developed through the different cultures that have existed here starting from the Valdivia culture, Machalilla, Engoroy-Chorrera, Bahia, Guangala and Manteños.

Through the archaeological remains found, it is surmised that their ancestors’ spirituality and understanding of the world around them was very large, but in particular, it was bound up with their environment as alive, of ocean and hilly forest, preserving and protecting it as well as transmitting their spiritual knowledge to new generations.

The Pueblo Manta that consists of the comunas Salango, Las Tunas, El Pital and Agua Blanca keeps alive these spiritual, cultural and pre-Columbian symbols of their own ancient worldview, which are presented in their cultural celebrations.

The worldview of the Pueblo Manta has always been connected to the shell spondylus, from the Valdivia culture until today.

== Salango. Salango Town. Comuna Salango ==
Salango is located on the shores of the Pacific, in southern Manabi Province, in the buffer zone of the Machalilla National Park. The community seeks to consolidate its development process by promoting ecotourism. This would allow them to use their natural and cultural resources in a way related to the ancient heritage of their ancestors.

Amongst the natural attractions is the island of Salango, home to beautiful species of seabirds such as blue-footed boobies, frigates, and pelicans among others. Nearby is a marine sanctuary, a site with schools of tropical fish and coral reefs, ideal for diving.

In the heart of the community is the Research Center and Museum Salango CIMS. It protects and exhibits an archaeological collection of 245 pieces that represent more than 4500 years of cultural heritage before the conquest. The center operates laboratories and has collections of archaeological, fauna, fish, and mollusks for studies and investigations. Included in the center is the hacienda house. It is operated as a historic museum devoted to the last 100 years of Salango's history.

== Salango Museum ==
The museum grounds function as an educational center for deepening the understanding of the area's cultural and marine resources. Programs are provided for children and adults of different educational levels.

== Geopolitics ==
They are located on the southern coast of Ecuador, in the canton Puerto Lopez, Manabi province. The Salango community is located along the south of the Ecuadorian coast, in the canton of Puerto López, Manabí Province. It is composed of villages of Salango Rio Chico.

== Land - legalization ==
Salango acquired legal status as a commune in the No. 074 Agreement, under the Ministry of Agriculture and Livestock on October 30, 1979. After a process of analysis and discussion of its historical past and identification, it was recorded in the Development Council for Nationalities and Peoples of Ecuador CODENPE by Agreement 016 on 19 April 2004, as a community of ancestral roots.

It has a communal territory of 2536 hectares. Its principal economic activity is fishing. The Community of Salango of the Canton Puerto Lopez, Manabì Province, holds property rights to a territory of about 2,536 hectares. It is made up of the small towns of Salango and Rio Chico.

These communities are descendants of the Pueblo Manta Huancavilca, with 5,000 years of history and culture. The first settlements belonged to the Valdivia culture, followed by Machalilla, Engoroy-Chorrera, Bahia, and Guangala. The last period before Spanish exploration has been called the Regional Integration Period Manteña (800-1530 AD).

In 1526, Spanish explorers first encountered native sailors of Salango. At that time the powerful chiefdom known as Salangome was the nucleus of a "League of Merchants" that dominated the sea trade. (Historian Jacinto Jijón y Caamaño, who was one of the first to study the Manta, likened this group to the Hanseatic League of Europe.)

They traded in a large variety of seafood and related products, including the Spondylus shell, or thorny oyster (actually a scallop). It was sacred to many pre-Hispanic cultures in South America. These shells were traded to inland communities, such as that of the Quitu in Ecuado, as well as to other indigenous peoples in a larger network reaching to present-day Chile, Peru, Argentina, Colombia and Mexico.

During the colonial era, the Spanish colonists imposed Catholicism on the indigenous peoples. By a synod of 1535, they also abolished the use of the original languages of Ecuador's coastal communities and required the use of Spanish. Traces and words of native languages remain, such as colonche, vine, Tuzco, Sercapez, Valdivia, and Salango.

Due to their natural advantages and resources, outside parties attempted to take over many communities, or to appropriate their resources.

In 1937 the Ecuadorian government enacted the Law of Organization and Management of Communes, which was intended to protect and ensure the existence and functioning of rural peasant communities and place them under the protection and supervision of the Ministry of Agriculture and Livestock. The creation of a comuna in an area included "every town that does not have the status of parish and was known as annexed, neighborhood, community, bear the name of community."

But the Act assumed that all rural communities were peasant communities, and did not account for the cultural and historical diversity of either towns and or their ancestral communities.

Subsequent reforms have not changed this view. In the 21st century, indigenous communities have appealed to constitutional law and international norms to protect themselves.

The Salango commune, aware of its historical and ancestral roots chose to separate the regime of the Communal rights and its former legal status. It exercised collective rights guaranteed in the Ecuadorian constitution and in Convention 169 of the International Labour Organization (ILO).

It recorded its new status as the Community Salango under Agreement No. 016 on April 19, 2004, in the Consejo de Desarrollo de las Nacionalidades y Pueblos del Ecuador CODENPE. This agency is responsible for defining policies for the reconstruction, strengthening and development of the indigenous towns and communities in the country.

In 2004 Salango developed its Comprehensive Plan for Community Development of Salango "PIDCOSA"; this was the basis for the Parish Development Plan. In addition, it has helped stimulate the projects "Ecotourism and Community Development of Handicraft" and "Production of Ecosystem Services".

In 2001 the Salangome Ecological Association declared a section of ocean to the north of the island Salango as a marine sanctuary. It intends to develop it for conservation, especially conservation of those species that reside on the seafloor. The site will also serve as a venue for research and tourism in Salango.

As part of PIDCOSA, the "Community Management Research Center and Museum Salango CIMS," project was developed in the beginning of 2005. The community officially took over the management of CIMS. The National Institute of Cultural Heritage declared the archaeological collections, which include 245 museum pieces, as belonging to the cultural heritage of the Commune Salango.

On March 31, 2011, the Ecuadorian Ministry of Tourism, issued the regulations for the Registration of Tourist Community Centers. By this traditional communities, which are legally organized and trained, can develop community tourism activities.
