= Ayampe =

Town in Puerto Lopez, Ecuador

- Town
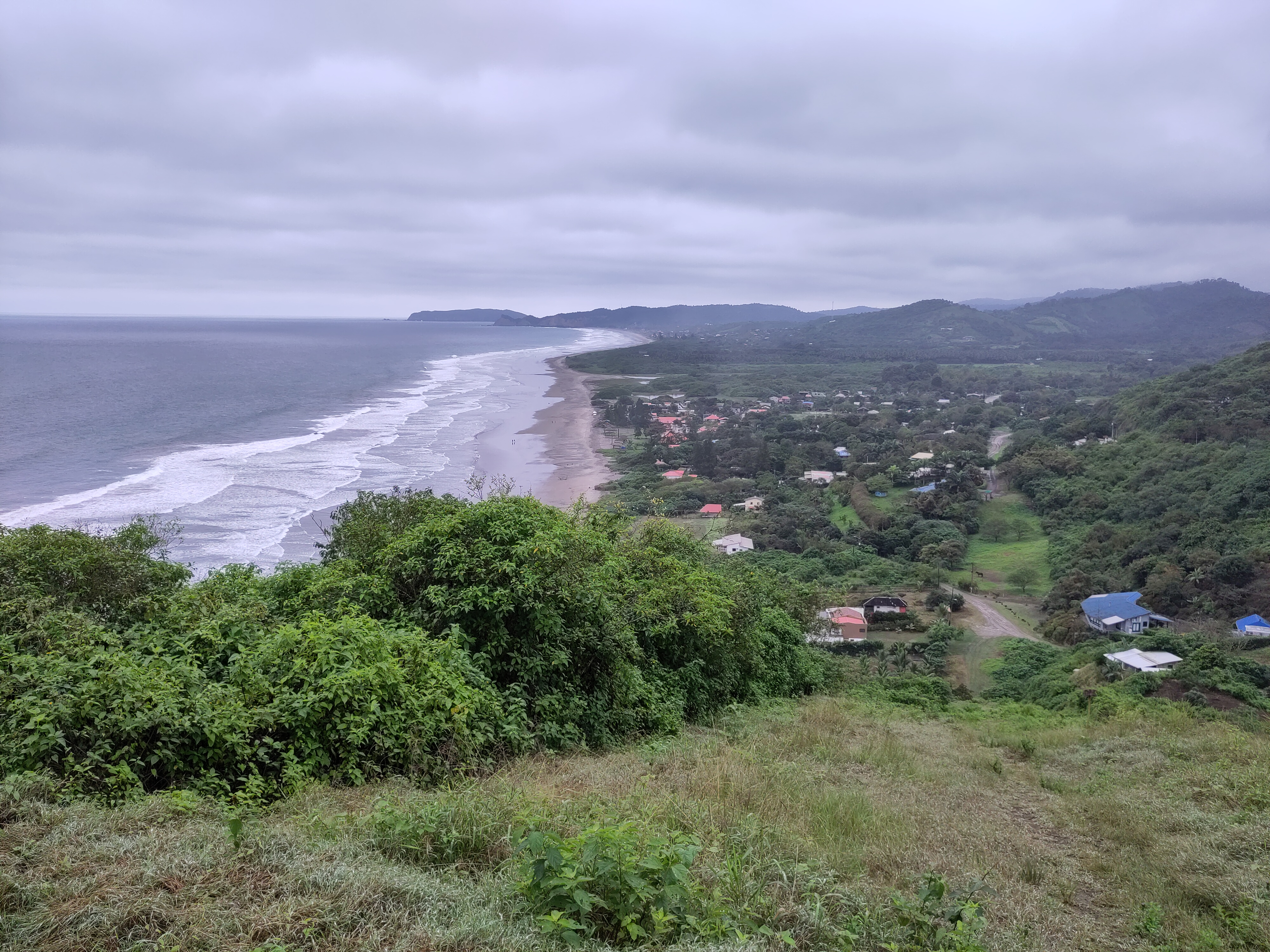
- Beach of Ayampe seen from the hill when entering Ayampe from the south

- Location within Ecuador Location within South America
- Coordinates: 1°40′40″S 80°48′45″W
- Country: Ecuador
- Province: Manabí Province
- Canton: Puerto López Canton

Population
  - Total: 400
- Time zone: UTC−5

Ayampe is a small coastal town located in the canton of Puerto Lopez, in Manabí province, approximately 301 km away from Quito, Ecuador.

== Description ==
Ayampe is a coastal town with a population size of approximately 400. While originally economically relying on the fishery, the last 2 decades evolved the town into a touristic hotspot. Although the area around Ayampe is not a protected area, it does provide a valuable area for the study around Ecuadorian coastal biodiversity due to its connectivity with the Machalilla National Park. Ayampe is part of the Ecuadorian Ruta del Sol.
