= Isla de la Plata =

Island of Manabí Province, Ecuador

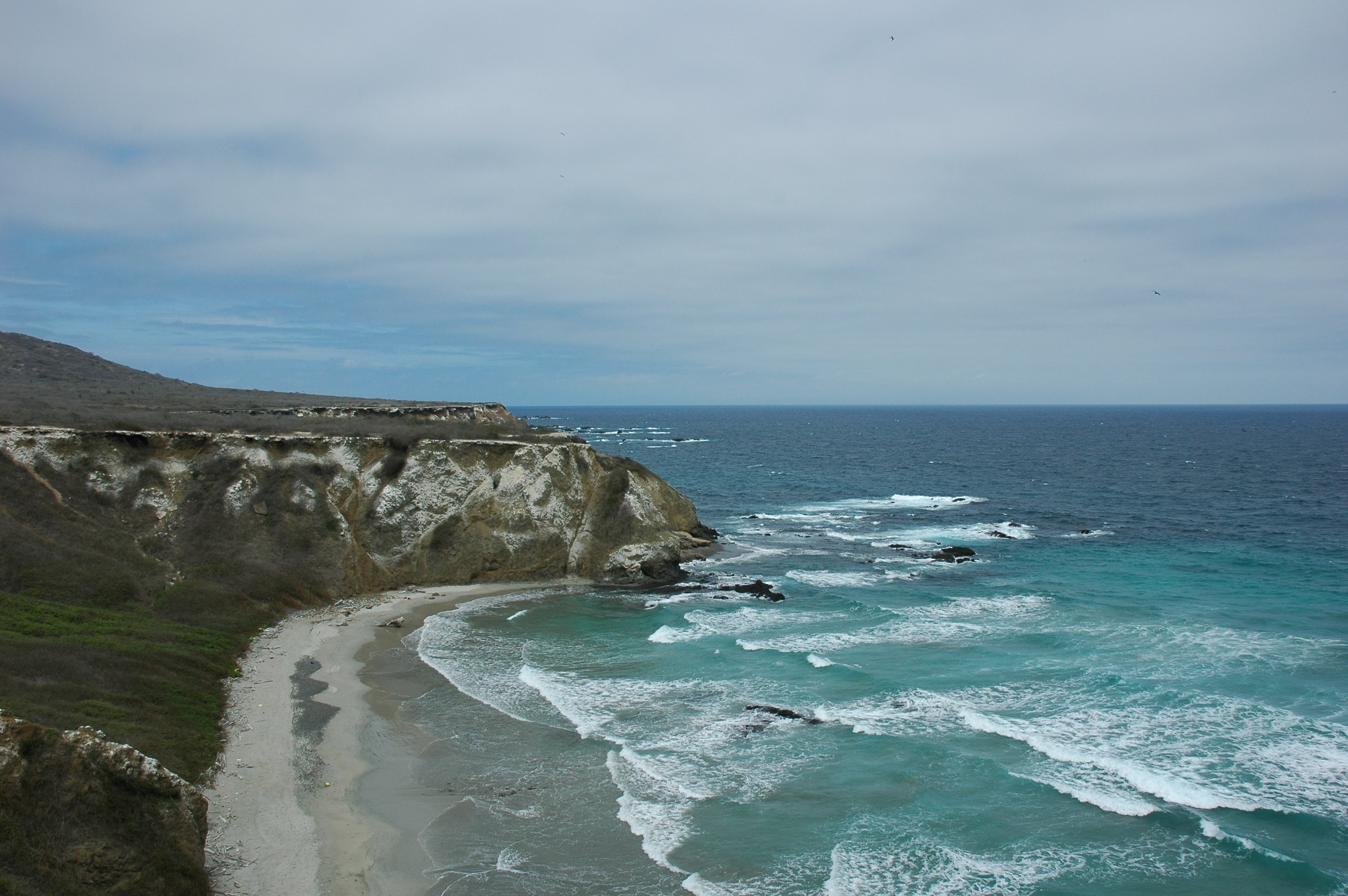
- Isla de la Plata

- Location within Ecuador
- Location: Manabí Province, Ecuador
- Coordinates: 1°16′43″S 81°04′07″W
- Area: 5.9 km^{2} (2.3 sq mi)

Isla de la Plata is a small island off the coast of Manabí, Ecuador, and is part of Parque Nacional Machalilla. Guided tours of the island are given on a couple of different hiking trails. It can be reached by boat from the city of Puerto López, which is 40 km away.

== History ==
There is a shrine from Inca times located on the island.

== Environment ==
On the island, there is a large diversity of animal species, including the blue-footed booby, red-footed booby, and the Nazca booby. Another species found here is the South American sea lion.

=== Important Bird Area ===
The island has been designated an Important Bird Area (IBA) by BirdLife International because it supports significant populations of resident Esmeraldas woodstars, magnificent frigatebirds and blue-footed boobies, breeding waved albatrosses, and wandering tattlers on passage.

== Gallery ==
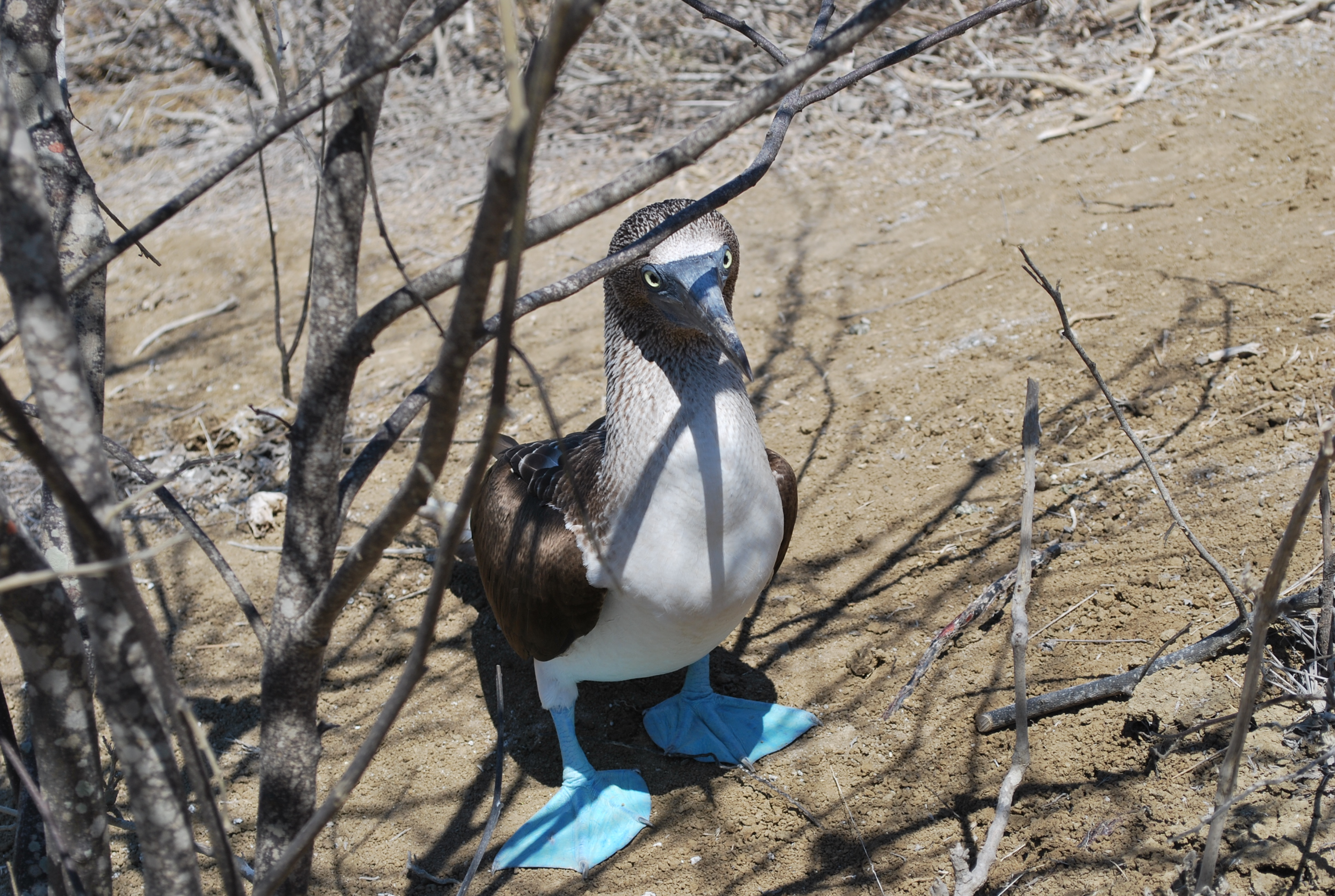
Blue-footed booby on Isla de la Plata in winter.

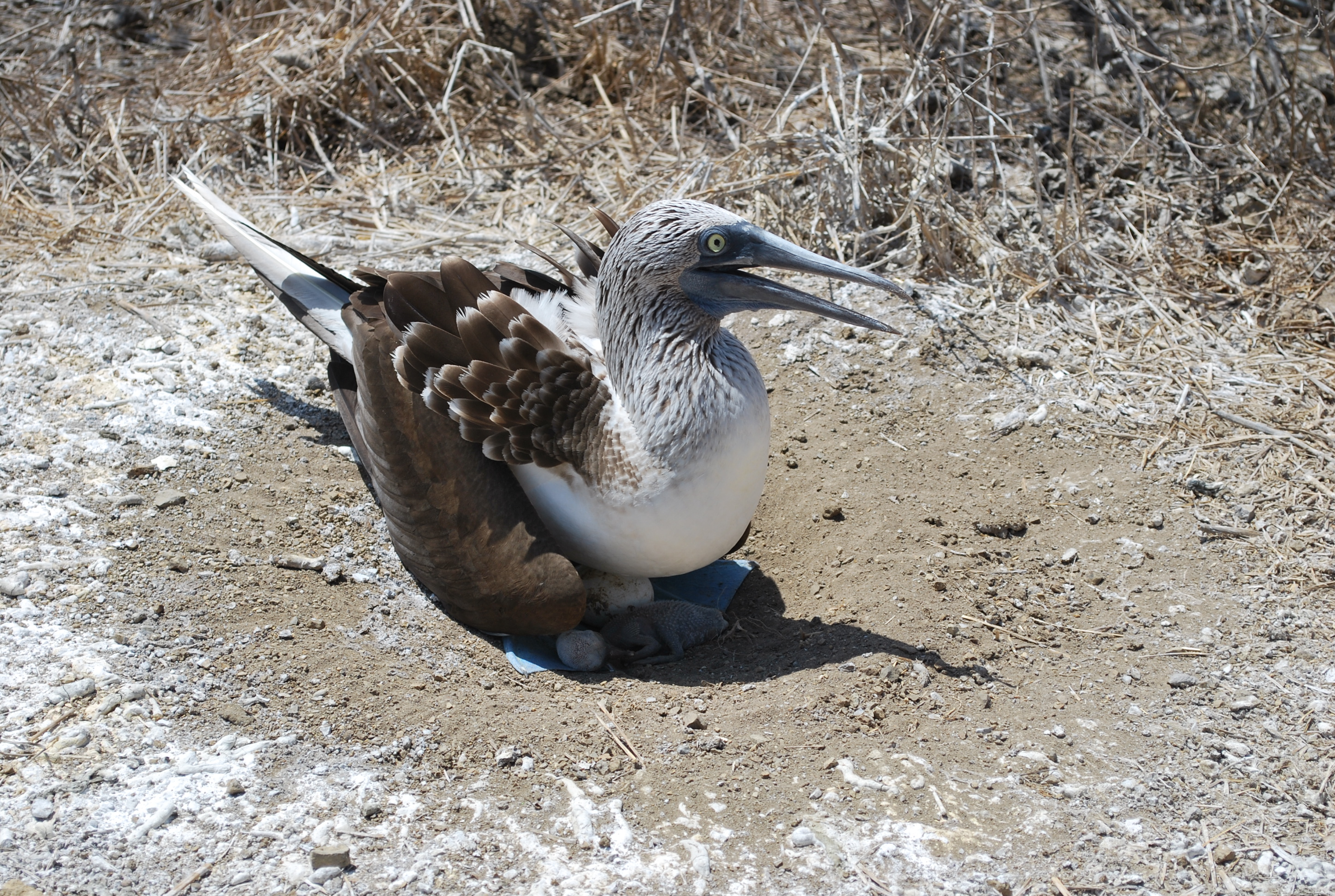
Blue-footed booby with new young on Isla de la Plata.

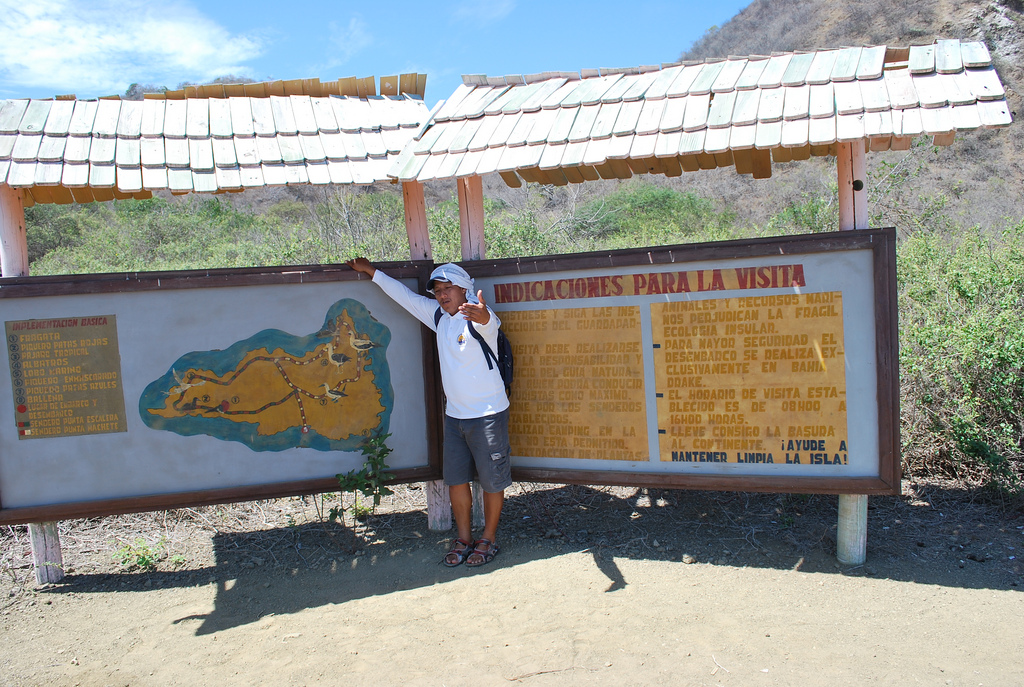
Tour guide addresses customers at the beginning of a tour.
