= Sport in Ecuador =

Sports in Ecuador influence the culture and its people. Football is the most popular sport, followed by Ecua-volley, basketball, tennis and cycling.

Since 2005, Ecuador has been greatly involved in sports and hosted the Guayaquil Marathon in Ecuador's largest city.

== Football ==
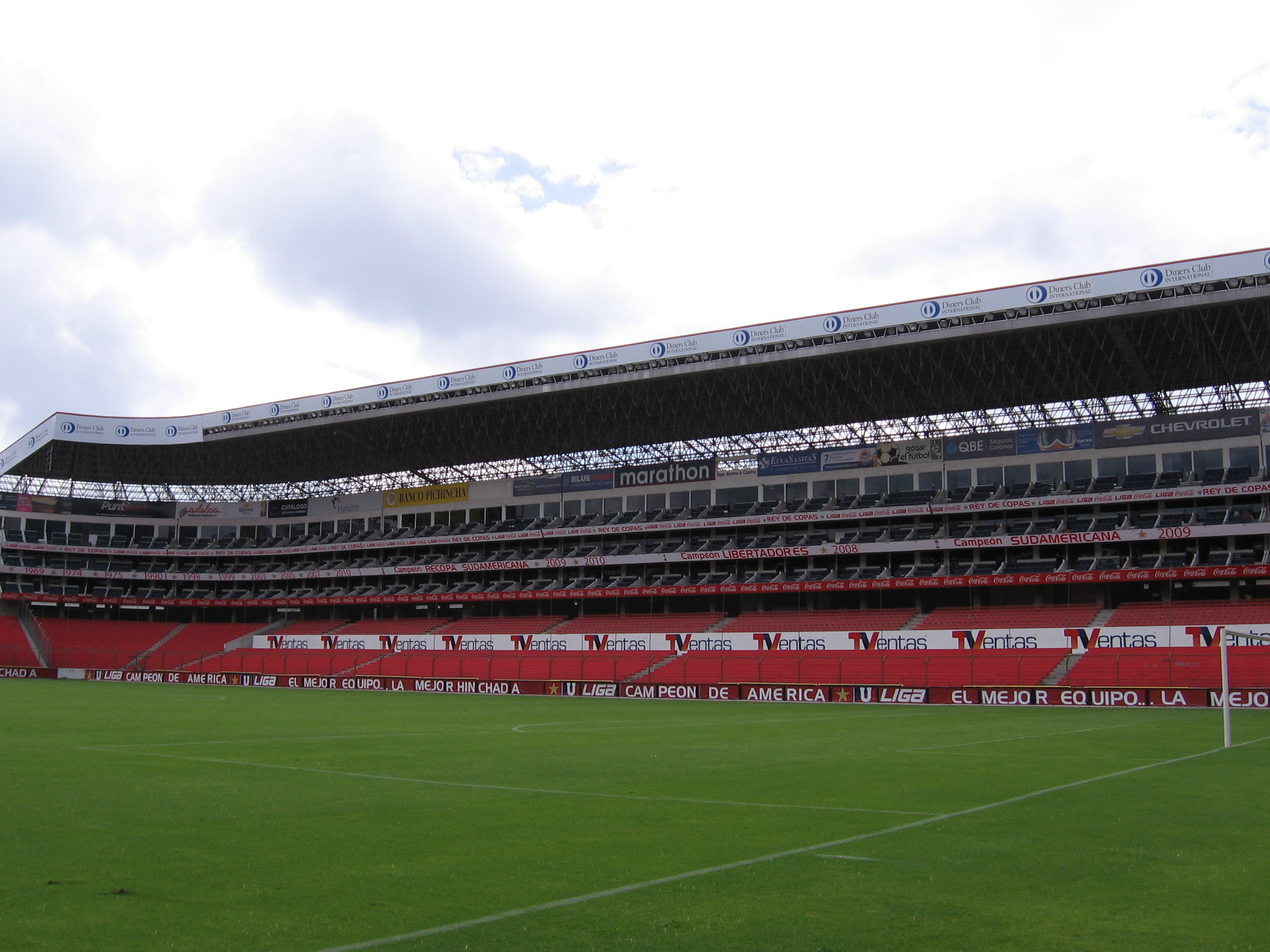
Estadio Casa Blanca, the largest stadium in Quito, and home of LDU Quito.

Football is the most popular sport in Ecuador. Its best known professional teams include Barcelona and Emelec from Guayaquil, LDU Quito, Deportivo Quito, El Nacional and Aucas from Quito, Deportivo Cuenca from Cuenca, Macará and Técnico Universitario from Ambato, Olmedo from Riobamba, LDU Portoviejo from Portoviejo, and Delfín Sporting Club from Manta.

The national team's matches are the most watched sporting events in the country. In June 2007, FIFA adopted a resolution, prohibiting international football games at or higher than 2,500m above sea level. Ecuador, Bolivia and other South American countries issued a joint letter of protest against this ruling. Ecuador qualified for the finals tournaments of the 2002, 2006, and 2014 editions of the FIFA World Cup.

Ecuador finished ahead of Poland and Costa Rica to come second to Germany in Group A in the 2006 FIFA World Cup, eventually falling to England in the Round of 16. Ecuador failed to advance past the group stage in 2002 and 2014, leaving the tournament in fourth and third place in their group, respectively.

== Tennis ==
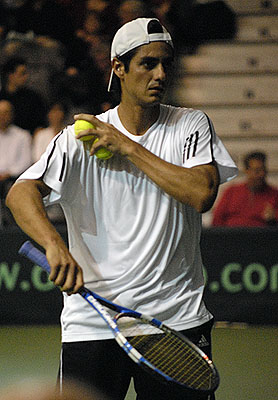
Nicolás Lapentti

There is a considerable interest in tennis in the middle and upper classes in Ecuadorian society, and several Ecuadorian professional players have attained national fame, including Nicolás Lapentti, Francisco Segura, and Andrés Gómez. As of 2015, Ecuador hosts an ATP World Tour 250 series event, the Ecuador Open Quito as part of the South-American summer clay-court circuit.

== Olympics ==
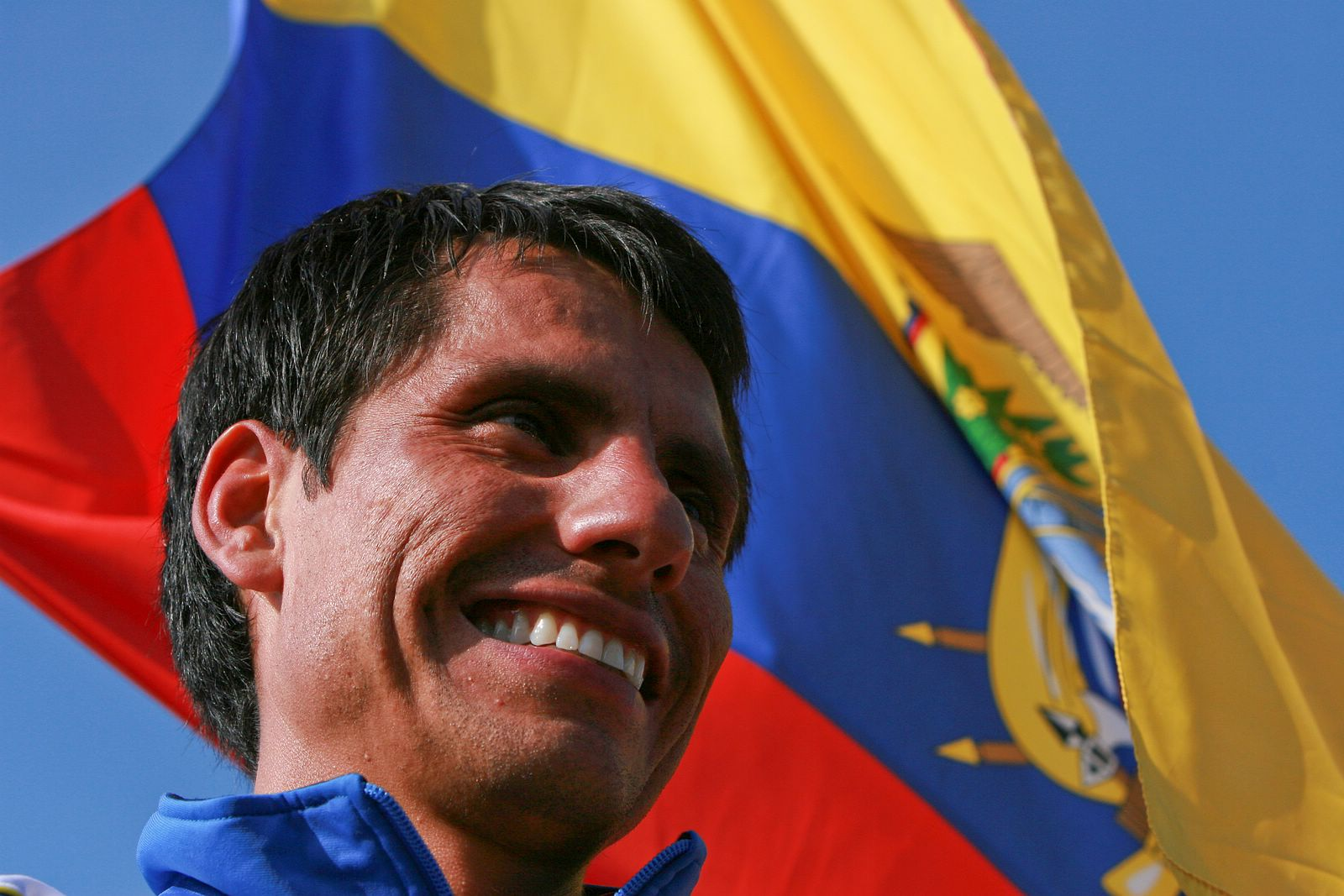
Jefferson Pérez is one of Ecuador's most successful sportsperson.

Ecuador has competed in eleven Summer Olympic Games. They participated in the Winter Olympic Games for the first time in 2018. The nation from South America won its first Olympic medal, when Jefferson Pérez won the gold medal in the Men's 20 km Walk. The Ecuadorian Olympic Committee was created in 1948 and recognized by the IOC in 1959.

== Other sports ==
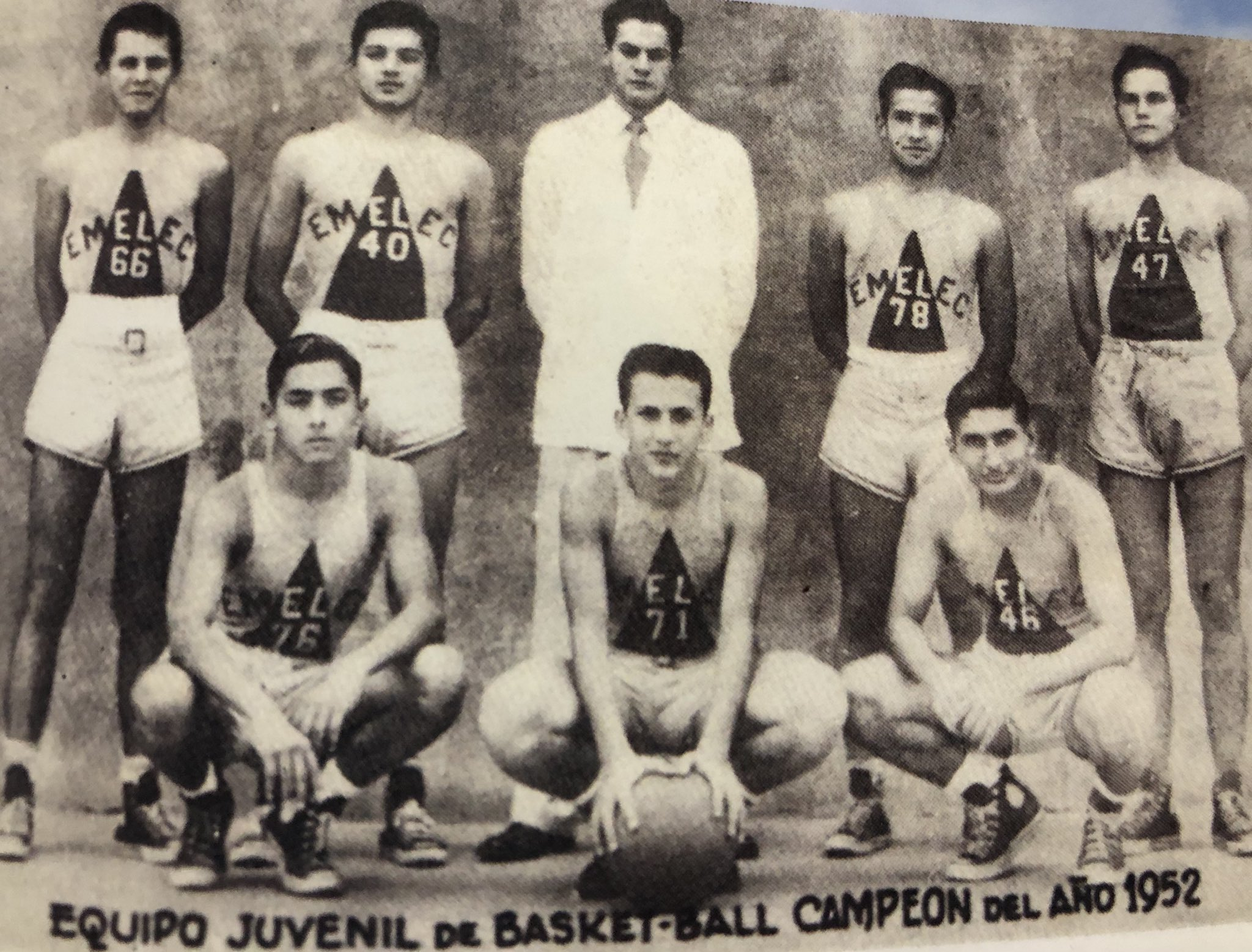
In the image, the Emelec youth team in 1952. Basketball, together with Equavolley, occupy the second place of the most practiced sports in Ecuador.

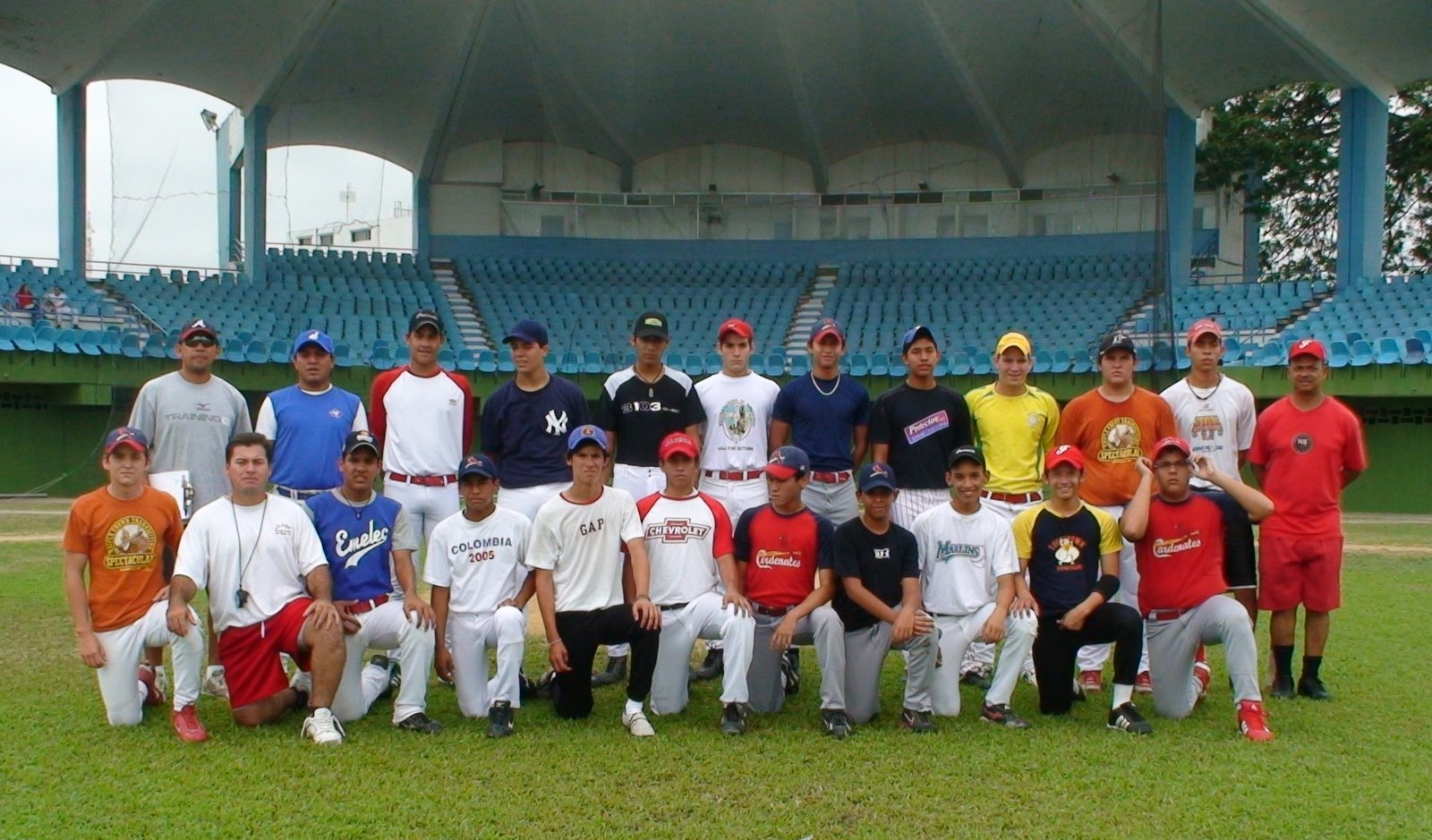
Youth baseball players at the Yeo Uraga stadium.

Basketball has a high profile, especially at amateur (high school and college) level as an alternative to football. It is sometimes considered as the second sport behind football; Ecuador even took part in the inaugural 1950 FIBA World Championship, finishing 8th out of 10 teams. There are regional leagues and a national league, which include clubs and teams from colleges as well.

One of Ecuador's specialties includes ecuavóley, a three-person variation of volleyball with more relaxed rules (the ball can be hit with the palm of the hand, and a football is traditionally used). Rugby union is found to some extent in Ecuador, with teams in Guayaquil, Quito, and Cuenca. Pelota nacional, an indigenous racquet sport, is also played. Surfing is popular in some coastal towns. Winter sports are very popular in the Andes Mountains, which have the most suitable climate for them.

Although Ecuador has several noteworthy areas for technical climbing, it is more known for its high-altitude volcanoes, which draw alpinists from all over the world.

There is flourishing activity in non-traditional sports such as inline hockey, capoeira, mountain biking, motorbiking, whitewater kayaking, skiing, snowboarding, and paintball. Martin Davalos, from Pichincha, Quito, is a well-known accomplished AMA motocross and supercross dirtbike rider and racer. Marlon Vera (aka Chito) is a champion mixed martial arts fighter from Manabi. In cycling, Richard Carapaz became the first Ecuadorian to win a Grand Tour. He won the 2019 Giro d'Italia

Some coastal resorts, particularly Montañita and Ayampe, have been developed as surfing centres. The 2005 World Rafting Championships were held on the Quijos River in Napo Province. Ecuador also hosted the 2007 Youth World Championship for rock climbing, held in Ibarra, becoming the first country outside of Europe or Asia to host the event.
