= 2023 Ecuadorian local elections =

The 2023 Ecuadorian local elections were held on 5 February 2023, alongside the 2023 Ecuadorian constitutional referendum. These elections determined 23 prefects, 23 vice-prefects, 221 mayors, 868 urban councilors, 437 rural councilors, and 4,084 principal members of the parish councils. The previous elections were held in 2019.

The results were widely hailed, alongside the rejection of all constitutional referendum questions, as a rebuke of President Guillermo Lasso, who had won the 2021 Ecuadorian general election. They were also seen as a major victory for leftist politician and former President Rafael Correa, whose Citizen Revolution Movement party won nearly every key race, including the mayoral races in both Quito and Guayaquil, with this last city having been a longtime stronghold of the right (and, most specifically, the Social Christian Party) until then.

More generally, the local elections were held during an escalating wave of crime and violence across Ecuador, linked by many sources to the growing influence of drug trafficking activities in the country, which was one of the issues President Lasso had originally aimed to tackle via the aforementioned constitutional referendum.

As a result of the generally increased tension, several politicians were directly attacked in the run-up to the election, with two of them being murdered: on 21 January 2023, Julio César Farachio, the Popular Unity Movement's candidate for mayor in the city of Salinas, was shot and killed while hosting an electoral rally; on 4 February, Omar Menéndez, the Citizen Revolution Movement's candidate for mayor in Puerto López, and one of his collaborators were shot dead by two unidentified men just a few hours before the ballots opened. Menéndez himself went on to win the election posthumously, although he was set to be replaced by another candidate from the same party.
