= Salango Island =

Ecuadorian island

Geography
- Location: Pacific Ocean
- Coordinates: 1°36′S 80°52′W
- Area: 1 km^{2} (0.39 sq mi)
- Length: 1,3 km (8.1 mi)
- Width: 1,15 km (71.5 mi)
- Highest point: 75 m

Administration
- Ecuador
- Province: Manabí Province

Demographics
- Population: 0
- Pop. density: 0/km^{2} (0/sq mi)

Salango Island is a South American island of approximately one square kilometer located in the Pacific Ocean one kilometer off the coast of the province Manabí in Ecuador near the town of Salango.

The island is part of the Machalilla National Park and is home to species such as the blue-footed booby (Sula nebouxii), while in the waters of the island, it is occasionally possible to observe whales. In the surroundings of Salango Island it is possible to observe blue-footed booby, sea lions and large rocks that, due to their peculiar shapes, the work of nature, receive the names of the King Kong monkey and the giant turtle

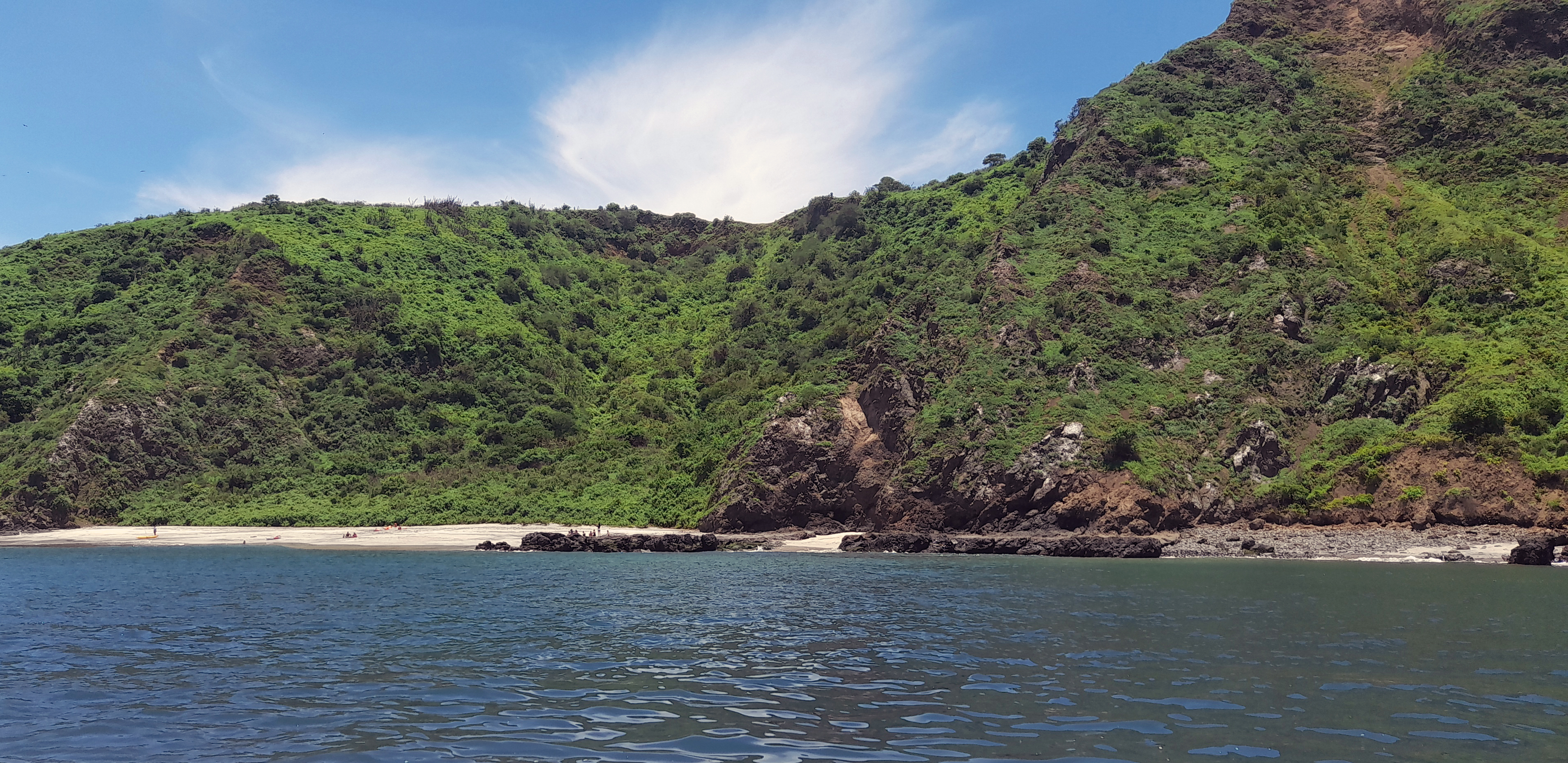
Salango Island

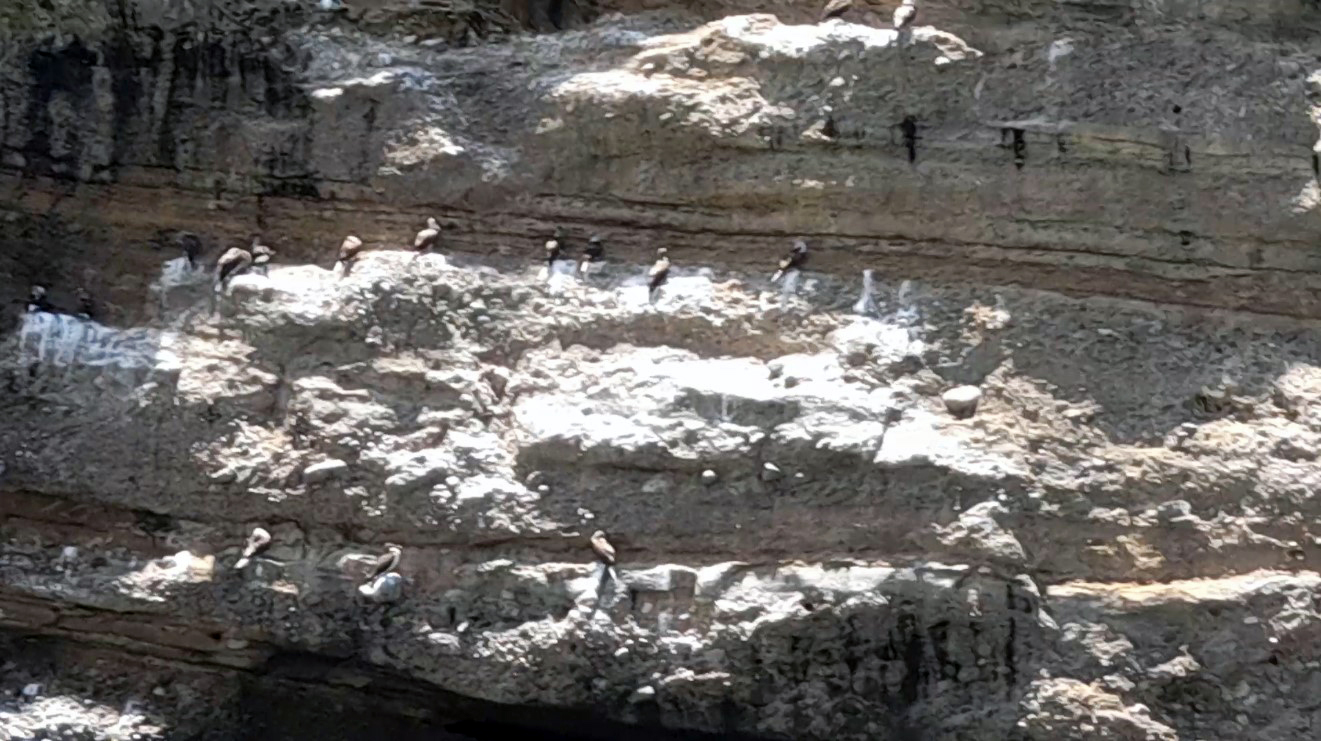
Blue-footed booby around Salango Island

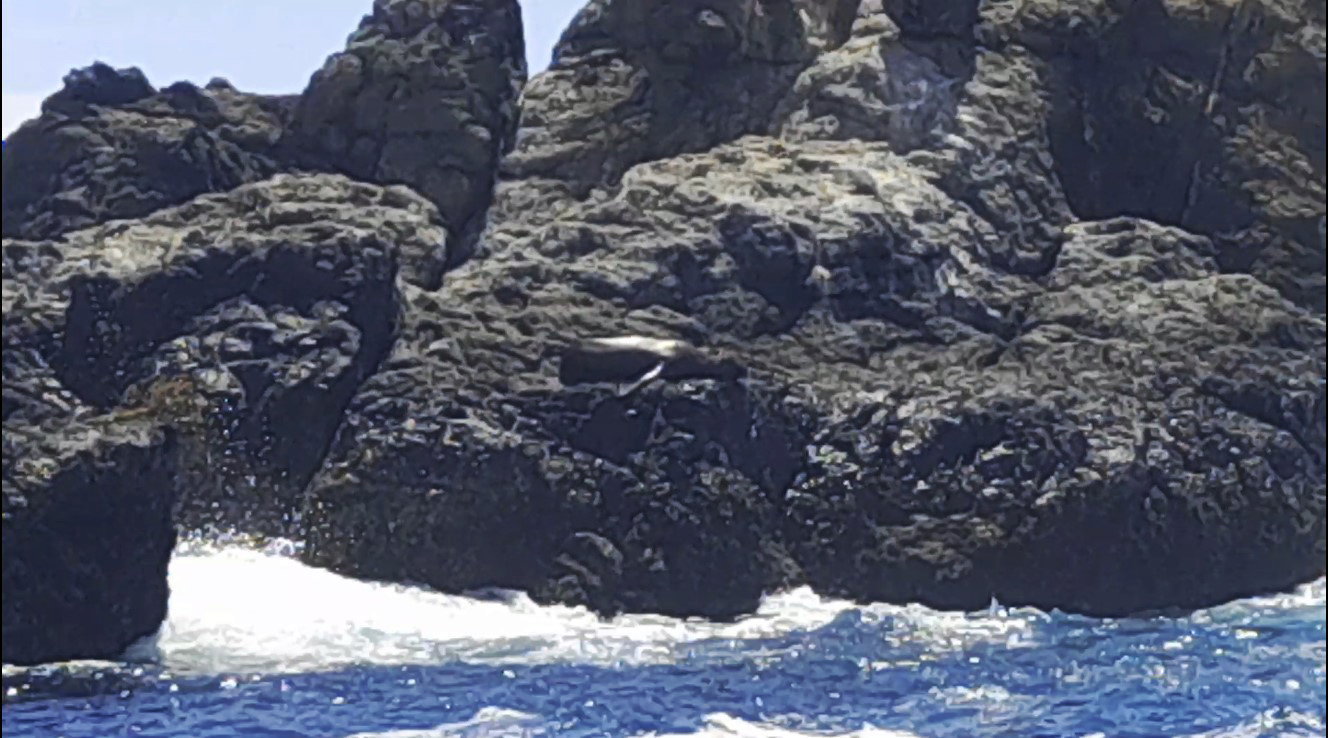
Sea lions in the surroundings of Salango Island

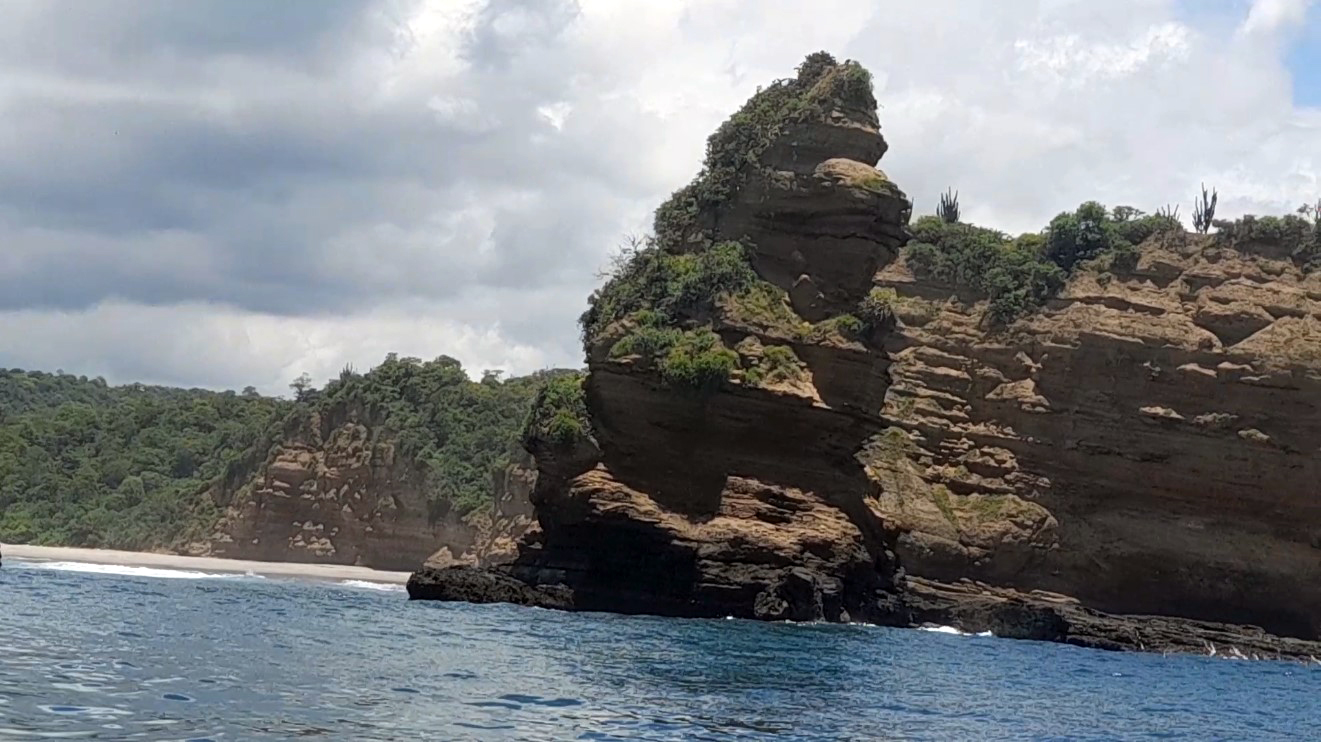
King Kong rock in the surroundings of Salango Island

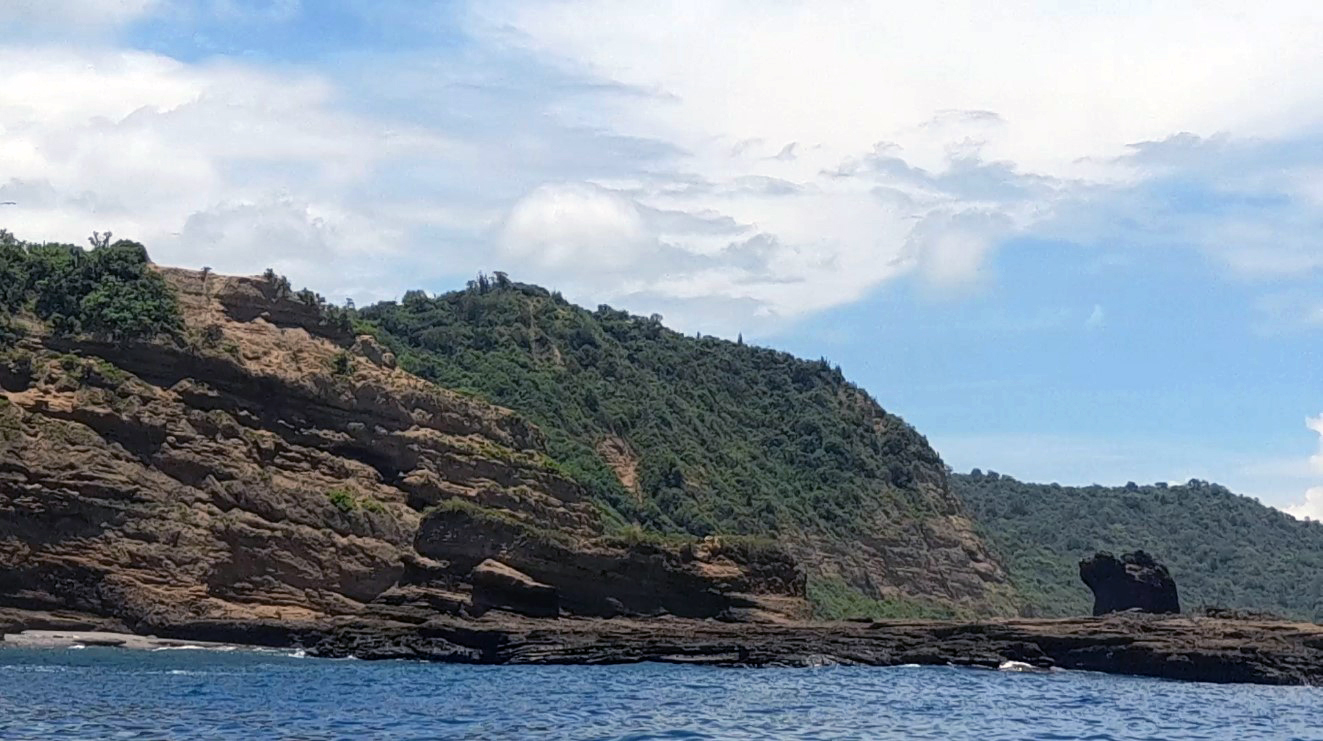
Turtle rock in the surroundings of Salango Island

== See also ==
- Geography of Ecuador
