= 2023 Ecuadorian constitutional referendum =

A constitutional referendum was held in Ecuador on 5 February 2023, alongside local elections. The binding consultation was called on 29 November 2022 by President Guillermo Lasso. Voters were asked to approve or reject a total of eight questions surrounding changes to the Constitution of Ecuador. Soon after the referendum, Reuters, Al Jazeera, CNN en Español and the Financial Times projected the failure of all eight of its proposals, with president Guillermo Lasso eventually conceding defeat.

== Background ==
Guillermo Lasso was elected President of Ecuador in the 2021 Ecuadorian general election against a candidate supported by former President Rafael Correa. Lasso had previously been defeated in the 2013 and 2017 elections before winning in 2021. However, Lasso's CREO party did not receive a majority of seats in the National Assembly, leading to a minority government.

Upon assuming the presidency, Lasso faced a number of crises in parliament, which added to the strikes and protests by indigenous groups against poverty and mining activities and oil exploration on their ancestral lands. These protests led to six deaths and hundreds of injuries before a new agreement was reached with the government at the end of June 2022.

In a politically fragile position, Lasso announced on 12 September 2022 his plans to hold a popular vote on eight questions which would allow him to "face problems Ecuador has not been able to solve in the past". This included extradition of Ecuadorians accused of working in international organised crime, reducing the number of National Assembly members from 137 to 100, establishing protection of water resources and funding for communities and groups for nature conservation. Many of these issues would involve revising the constitution to be implemented.

Lasso's predecessors Lenin Moreno and Rafael Correa both sought public input through a popular vote, in 2018 and 2017 respectively.

After the questions were approved by the constitutional court, President Lasso signed a decree on 29 November to hold a referendum on 5 February 2023, the same day as elections for municipal and provincial councillors as well as members of the Council for Citizen Participation and Social Control. The results of the referendum are legally binding. The official campaign period begins on 3 January at midnight.

== Referendum questions ==
The referendum has eight questions, each of which modify one or more articles of the constitution.

Currently, extradition of Ecuadorian citizens is prohibited, regardless of the crime committed. The first referendum question would permit the extradition of individuals demanded by other countries for the crimes related to international organised crime, including drug trafficking, arms trafficking, human trafficking and migrant smuggling. This has been called the most controversial of the referendum questions. Since 2016, Ecuador has seen an increase in its rate of homicide, from 5.8 per 100,000 in 2016 to 19.6 per 100,000 in 2022, the highest rate ever recorded in the country. Authorities believe this to be due to clashes between rival gangs for control of the drug market.

The second referendum question focuses on judicial reform. Currently, the Judicial Council selects, trains, evaluates, promotes and sanctions prosecutors. The proposal suggests putting that control in the hands of the Attorney General, who would exercise these powers through a Fiscal Council.

Currently, the National Assembly is composed of 137 seats, of which 116 are elected through districts that correspond to the borders of the 24 Provinces of Ecuador, 15 from a national list, and six seats reserved for the diaspora. The seats are due to increase to 152 seats in the next elections to correspond with increases in the country's population. The third referendum question asks whether to reduce the number of seats to 100: one seat for each of the 24 provinces, then one seat for every 250,000 inhabitants per province, two seats for every million inhabitants in the national constituency, and one seat for every 500,000 members of the diaspora.

In 2023, Ecuador had 272 political parties. The fourth referendum question suggests setting a minimum number of members for a political party to be registered and participate in elections. This minimum would be set at 1.5% of the total number of registered voters in district where they are running. Political parties will have to keep a register of their members which can be audited by the National Electoral Council.

The Council for Citizen Participation and Social Control has the power to appoint 77 government positions, including Attorney General, State Comptroller, the Ombudsman and members of the National Electoral Council. The fifth referendum question suggests entrusting this power with the National Assembly, within a framework of public policies guaranteeing citizen participation, meritocracy and citizen control.

Members of the Council for Citizen Participation and Social Control (CPCCS) are directly elected every four years by the population during national elections. Referendum question six proposes allowing the National Assembly to choose members of the council through indirect suffrage.

Currently, the constitution excludes water protection areas from the National System of Protected Areas in Ecuador. Referendum question seven would create a water protection agency within the National System.

The eighth referendum question would provide compensation to individuals, communities, and indigenous peoples for environmental damages.

== Opinion polls ==
Opinion polls conducted prior to the voted consistently indicated that all the questions would receive positive responses, mostly by ample margins.

Date	Source	Sample	Confidence	Q1		Q2		Q3		Q4		Q5		Q6		Q7		Q8	
Date	Source	Sample	Confidence	Yes	No	Yes	No	Yes	No	Yes	No	Yes	No	Yes	No	Yes	No	Yes	No
6 January 2023	Clima Social	3,910	95%	69.3%	21.1%	61.9%	23.6%	82.3%	11.1%	79.9%	11.7%	49.4%	27.1%	54.8%	21.4%	79.9%	10.7%	77.8%	12.3%
21 December 2022	IPSOS	2,490	95%	68%	32%	72%	28%	86%	14%	82%	18%	69%	31%	76%	24%	88%	12%	84%	16%
15 December 2022	CEDATOS	2,508	95%	61.3%	30.9%	64.1%	24.5%	73.3%	18.9%	65.1%	22.0%	58.5%	25.1%	54.9%	26.8%	71.1%	17.0%	69.2%	21.1%
1–4 October 2022	IPSOS	2,490	95%	72%	28%	72%	28%	81%	19%	75%	25%	67%	33%	-	-	76%	24%	77%	23%
14–17 September 2022	CEDATOS	2,300	+/- 2.4%	71.9%	21.7%	71.5%	17.8%	81.4%	12.2%	75.1%	13.8%	66.7%	18.3%	-	-	75.6%	13.2%	76.8%	14.5%

== Results ==
Despite opinion polls predicting a large majority in favor of approving all measures, each was rejected. However, the electoral authority claims a lot of counterfeit ballots were submitted with "no".

Question		For		Against		Blank	Invalid	Registered voters	Turnout	Outcome
Question		Votes	%	Votes	%	Blank	Invalid	Registered voters	Turnout	Outcome
1	Extradition	3,930,186	48.46	4,180,555	51.54	1,937,911	937,766	13,450,047	81.68	Rejected
2	Changes in the Office of the Prosecutor	3,433,089	43.29	4,497,565	56.71	2,103,472	948,593	13,450,047	81.66	Rejected
3	Reduction of Assembly members	3,722,695	46.93	4,209,161	53.07	2,098,319	956,393	13,450,047	81.68	Rejected
4	Reduction of political organizations	3,595,753	45.45	4,315,829	54.55	2,118,974	956,377	13,450,047	81.69	Rejected
5	Power to designate control authorities	3,381,729	42.37	4,600,312	57.63	2,036,592	968,370	13,450,047	81.69	Rejected
6	Form of election of the CPCCS	3,321,974	42.13	4,563,193	57.87	2,137,580	962,260	13,450,047	81.67	Rejected
7	Water protection subsystem	3,501,821	44.59	4,352,017	55.41	2,182,036	949,381	13,450,047	81.67	Rejected
8	Compensation for environmental damages	3,438,661	44.04	4,368,848	55.96	2,236,660	939,646	13,450,047	81.66	Rejected
Source: CNE
