= Puerto López =

- Town
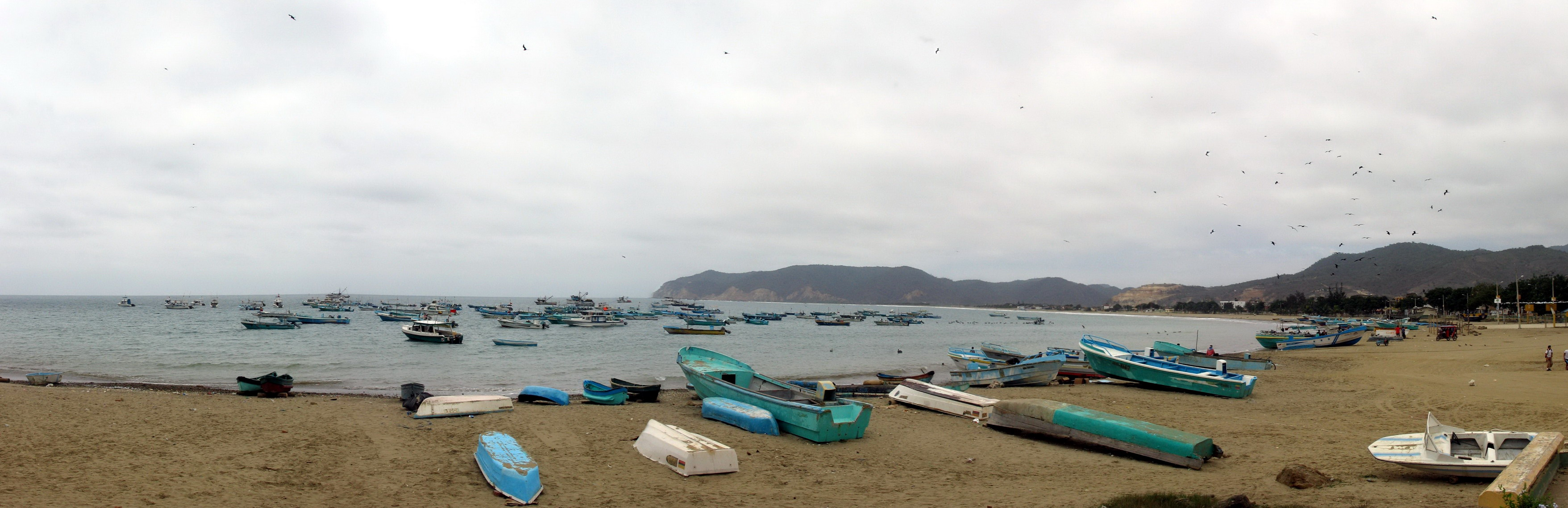
- The beach at Puerto Lopez

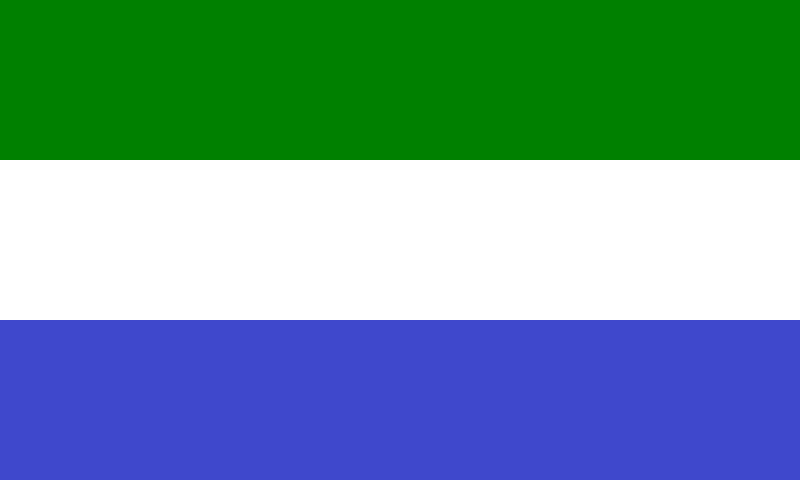
- Flag

- Location in Ecuador
- Coordinates: 01°33′32″S 80°48′38″W
- Country: Ecuador
- Province: Manabí
- Canton: Puerto López

Area
  - Town: 4.7 km^{2} (1.8 sq mi)

Population (2022 census)
  - Town: 12,598
  - Density: 2,700/km^{2} (6,900/sq mi)
- Time zone: UTC-5 (ECT)
- Climate: BWh

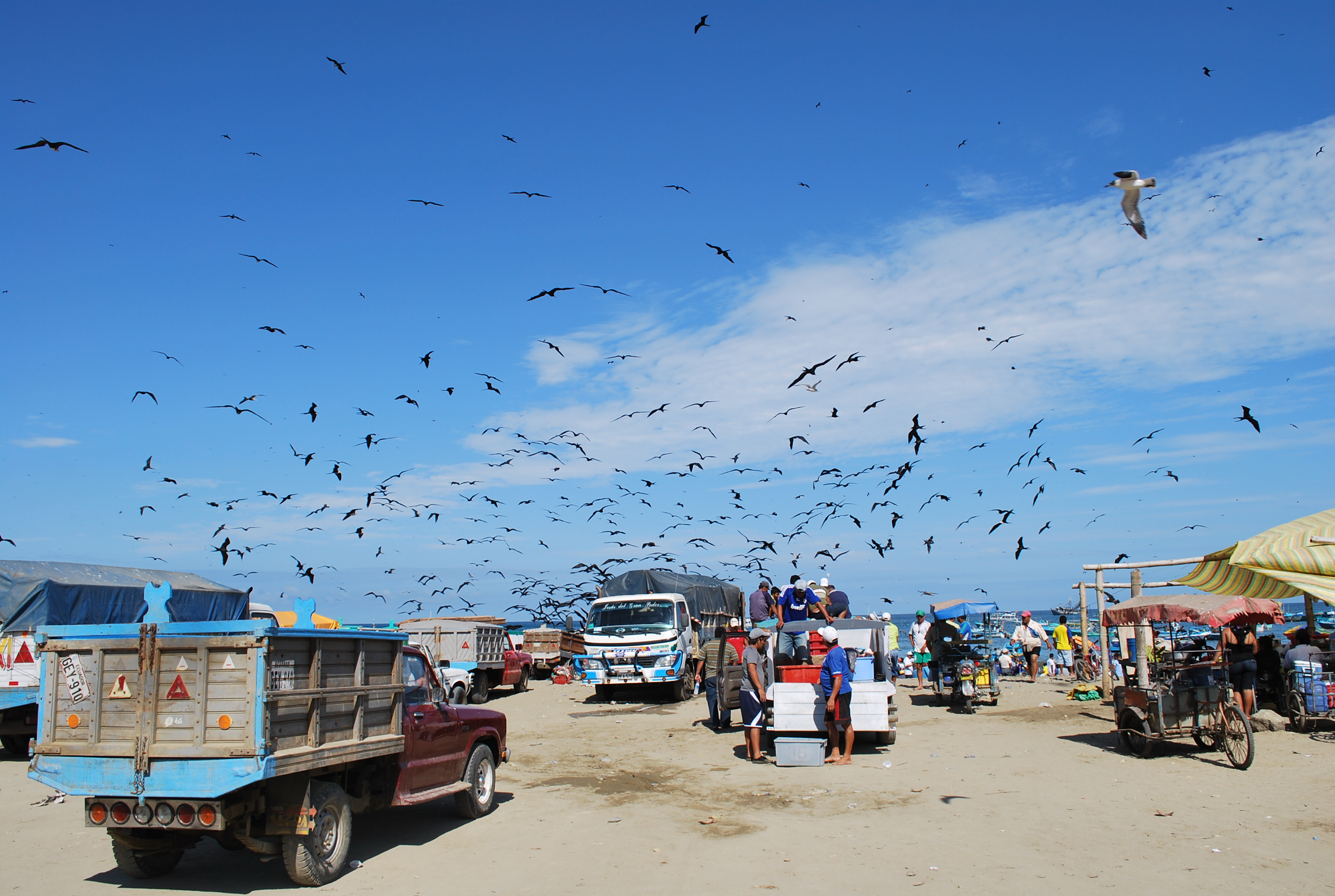
Local fishermen attract sea birds as they prepare to load the morning's catch in Puerto López.

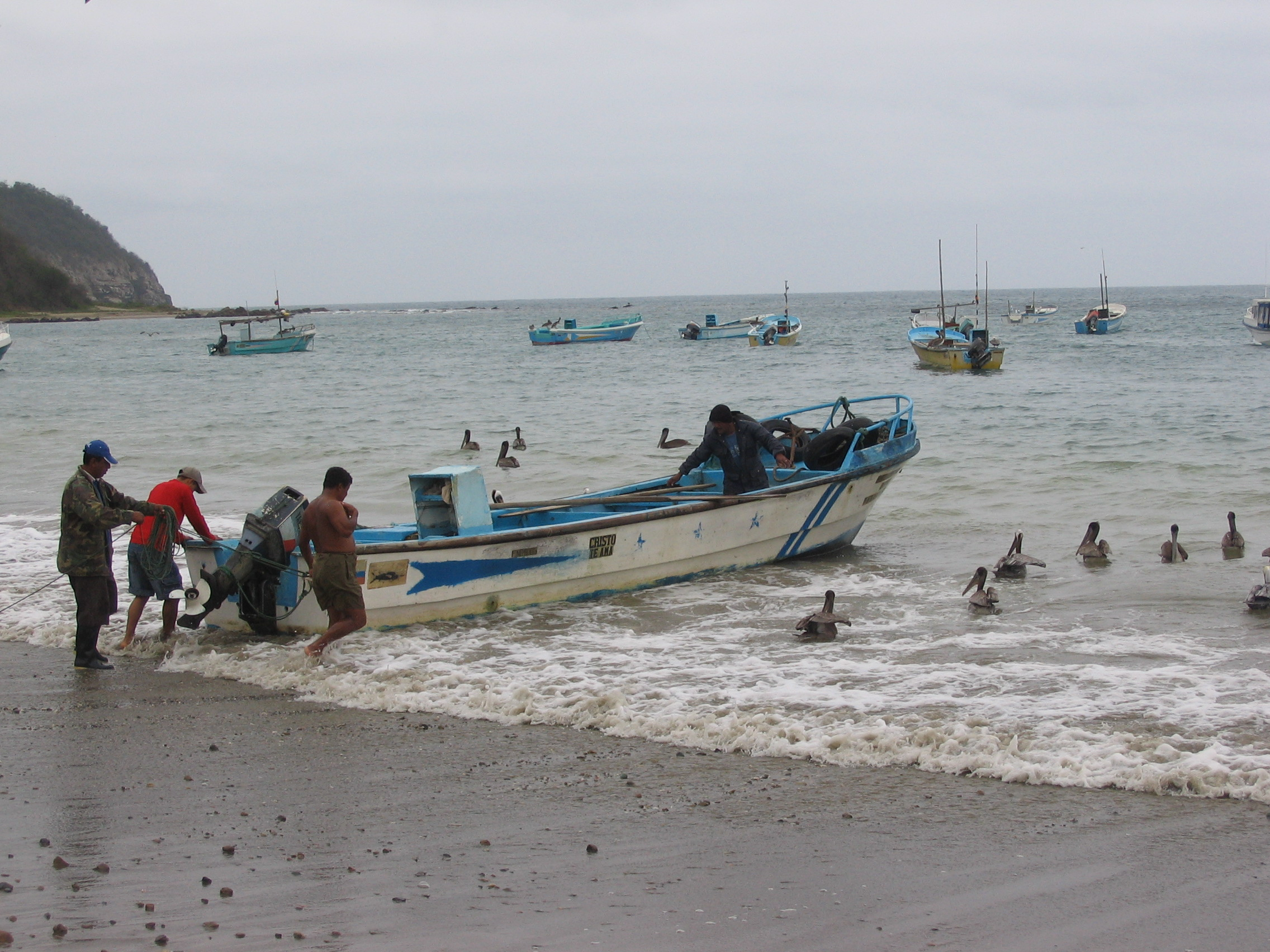
Fishermen leaving Puerto Lopez

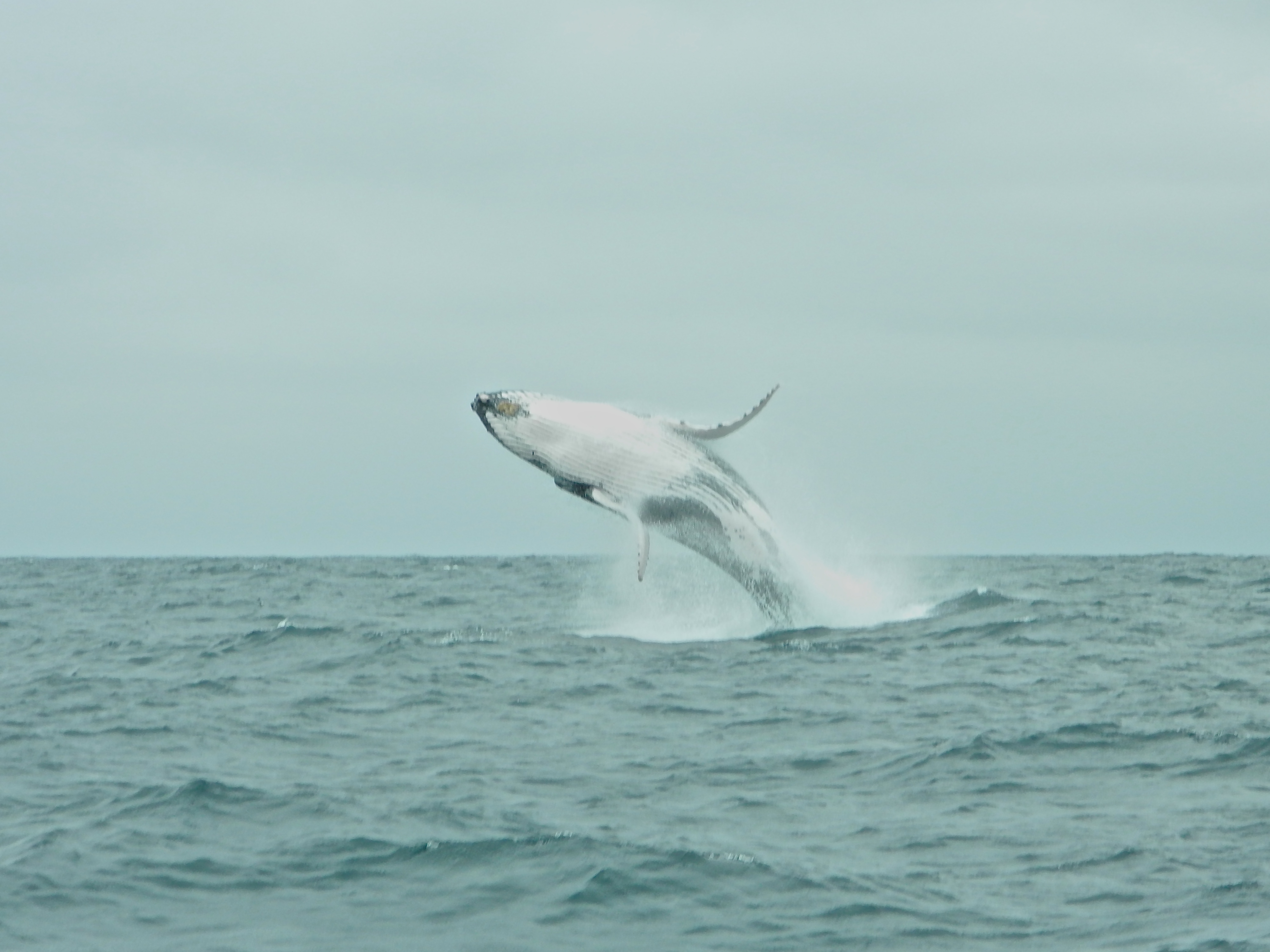
Humpback whale breaching off the village.

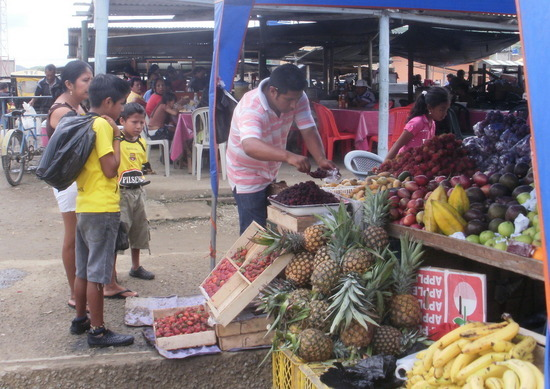
Shopping at the market in Puerto Lopez

Puerto López, with a population of 12,598, is a fishing village set in an arched bay on the Pacific coast in the Ecuadorian Manabí Province. Puerto Lopéz is the Machalilla National Park headquarters. The main industries include fishing and ecotourism. The street closest to the beach has many restaurants, cabanas that provide drinks, and some nightclubs.

Fishing is an important activity in Puerto Lopéz. In local waters there are amberjack, dolphin, wahoo, marlin, and tuna of many different species.

== Tourism ==
Whale watching is popular from mid-June to October and tours can be booked in town. At this time of year the huge humpback whales mate and the odds of spotting whales is high. Humpback whales mate behind Salango Island, this island is in the community Salango.

=== Isla de la Plata ===
40 kilometres offshore is Isla de la Plata (named from its history as a pirate hideout, the Island of the Silver), also referred to as "The Poor Man's Galapagos." There some species that also inhabit the Galapagos like the blue and red-footed booby, nazca booby, frigatebirds, albatross, pelican and other seabirds that are nesting in colonies can be found. The island is surrounded by coral reef and snorkeling is a popular activity. On the boat ride from Puerto Lopez to the island pods of dolphins can often be seen.

=== Los Frailes ===
Just north of Puerto Lopez is the beach of Los Frailes, which is part of the National Park of Machalilla. There is an approximately 2 hour hike in this area that goes first to Playita Negra, a black sand beach, then to La Tortuguita beach, to a lookout point over the beaches (Mirador), and ends at Los Frailes.

=== Agua Blanca ===
Also north of Puerto Lopez is the indigenous village and archaeological site of Agua Blanca. There is a museum in the small town, and a guide is included in the $5 cost to enter the area. There is a hike around the site, which ends at a sulfur lagoon, where guests can swim and cover themselves in mud from the bottom of the lagoon. There is also a lookout point and 2 small restaurants there.

=== Salango ===
The Salango community has deep ancestral roots that represent about 5000 years of history and culture.

Salango is located on the shores of the Pacific, in southern Manabi Province, in the buffer zone of the Machalilla National Park. The community seeks to consolidate its development process with the promotion of one of the main features the community-based ecotourism, taking advantage of the natural and cultural resource that are related to the ancient heritage of those who settled in this sector. Amongst its natural attractions is the island of Salango, home to beautiful species of seabirds like blue-footed boobies, frigates, pelicans among others; just off the island's pristine beach is the marine sanctuary, a site with schools of tropical fish and coral reefs, ideal for diving.

In the heart of the community is the Research Center and Museum Salango CIMS that protects and exhibits in its original place an archaeological collection of 245 pieces of cultural heritage that represent over 4500 years before the conquest. The center possesses laboratories and collections of archaeological, fauna, fish, and mollusks for studies and investigations. Part of the center includes the hacienda house that functions as a historic museum that recounts the last 100 years of Salango's history.
