= Machalilla Parish =

Machalilla
- Rural parish
- Location within Ecuador
- Coordinates: 1°29′S 80°45′W
- Country: Ecuador
- Province: Manabí
- Canton: Puerto López
- Time zone: UTC-5 (ECT)

Machalilla is a rural parish of Puerto López Canton, Manabí Province, Ecuador.
