= Puerto López Canton =

- Canton
- Location of Manabí Province in Ecuador.

- Puerto López Canton in Manabí Province
- Coordinates: 01.54°S 80.80°W
- Country: Ecuador
- Province: Manabí Province

Area
  - Total: 430.5 km^{2} (166.2 sq mi)

Population (2022 census)
  - Total: 25,630
  - Density: 59.54/km^{2} (154.2/sq mi)
- Time zone: UTC-5 (ECT)

Puerto López Canton is a canton of Ecuador, located in Manabí Province. Its capital is the town of Puerto López. Its population at the 2001 census was 16,626.

== Demographics ==
Ethnic groups as of the Ecuadorian census of 2010:

- Mestizo 80.8%
- Montubio 6.9%
- Afro-Ecuadorian 5.9%
- White 3.4%
- Indigenous 2.6%
- Other 0.5%

== See also ==
- Salango
