= Machalilla National Park =

National park in Ecuador

- IUCN category II (national park)
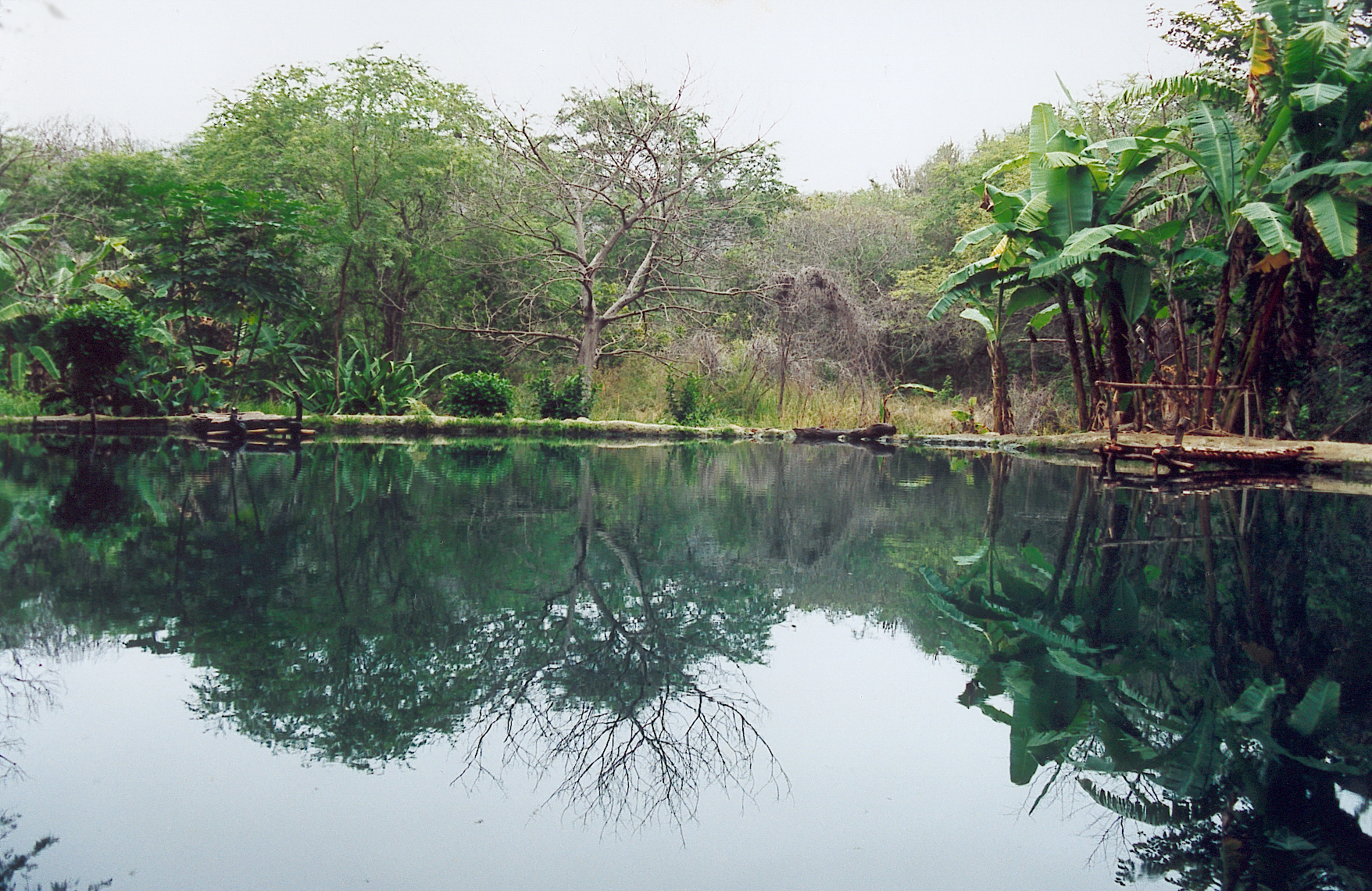
- Sulfur lagoon, Aguablanca, Machalilla National Park

- Location within Ecuador
- Location: Ecuador; Manabí Province
- Nearest city: Puerto López
- Coordinates: 1°33′45″S 80°49′48″W
- Area: 750.59 km^{2} (289.80 sq mi)
- Established: 26 July 1979

Ramsar Wetland
- Official name: Zona Marina Parque Nacional Machalilla
- Designated: 7 September 1990
- Reference no.: 503

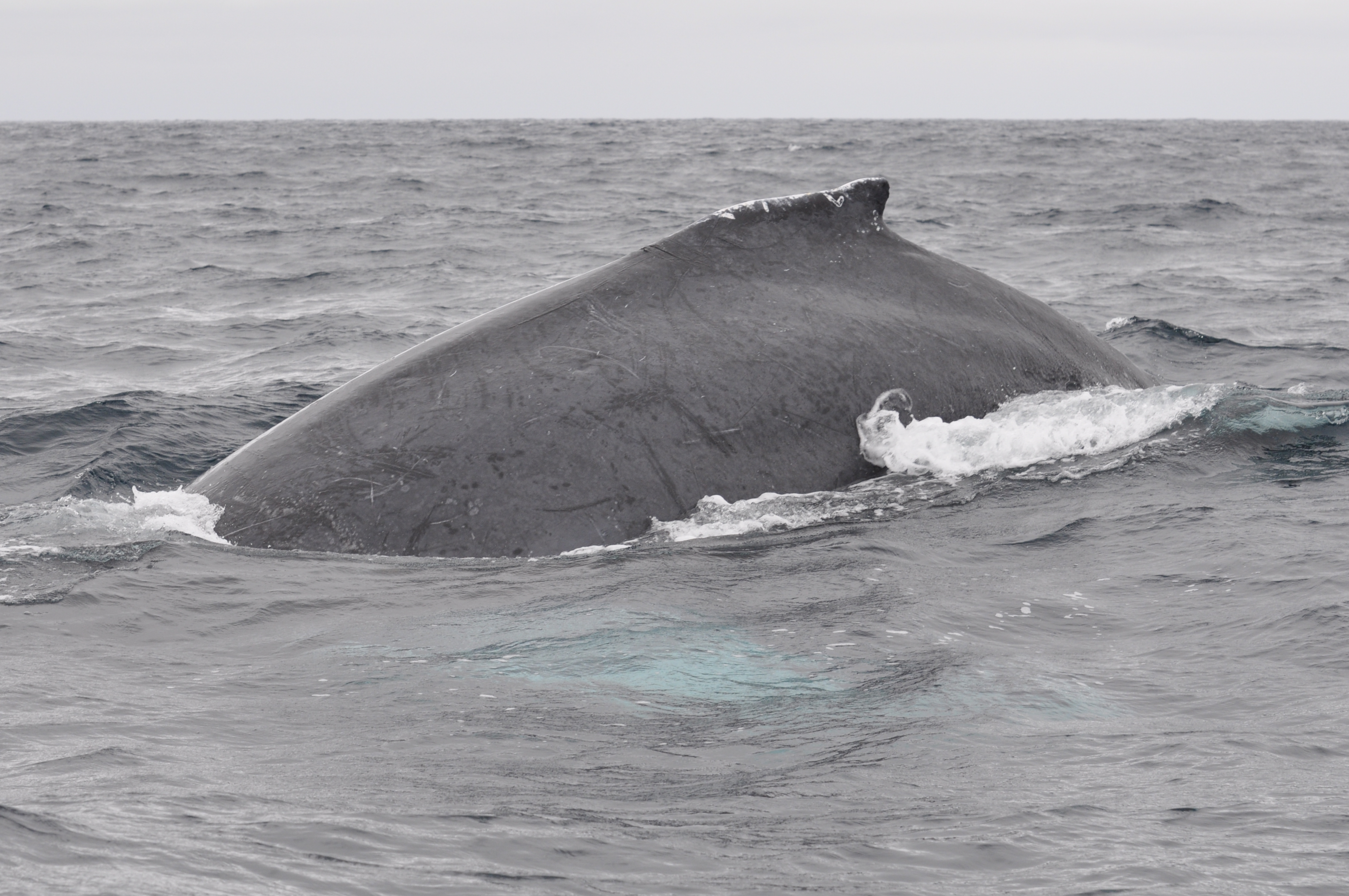
Humpback whale off the park coasts

Machalilla National Park (Spanish: Parque Nacional Machalilla) is a preserve in the Ecuadorian Manabí Province near Puerto López and the rural parish of Machalilla, a small fishing village in the vicinity of the park.

Established in 1979, Machalilla National Park near Puerto Lopéz rests along the Pacific coast. It incorporates beaches, fog forest, dry forest, small islands and two larger islands, Salango and Isla de la Plata, the latter named for a legendary hoard of silver left by Sir Francis Drake.

In 1990 the park was named an internationally important wetland under the Ramsar Convention. Wildlife includes armadillos, two species of monkeys and birds of more than 270 species. Many of the large mammals in Machalilla National Park are regionally and locally endangered. Machalilla National Park is the only habitat outside of the Galapagos Islands of waved albatross. The only known records of the Belted Kingfisher in Ecuador also come from the coastland of Ecuador. The ocean regions of the park also provide a breeding ground for humpback whales. Vegetation includes opuntia cactus, palo santo trees, Ceiba pentandra (kapok) trees and the algaroba tree. Most of the tropical scrub desert and forest of western Ecuador, once 25 percent but now only one percent, can be found in the park.

Machalilla National Park has been threatened by a number of factors, including deforestation, commercial fishing, poaching and the ecological impact of the tourist industry. In 1991, The Nature Conservancy, the United States Agency for International Development and a group of partner organizations across Latin America and the Caribbean began contributing funds for conservation as part of the Parks in Peril (PiP) program. Machalilla National Park opened an on-site center for educating visitors about the ecology of the park and conservation issues. The park also hired locals to serve as guards, increasing local awareness of the issues impacting the park. Machalilla's partner organization, Fundación Natura, has also worked with local communities to provide training on environmentally agricultural and fishing practices.

Machalilla culture received its name from the archaeological excavations in the area. This culture may go back to as early as 1800 BCE, and is known for its ceramics.
