= Reincarnation in popular culture =

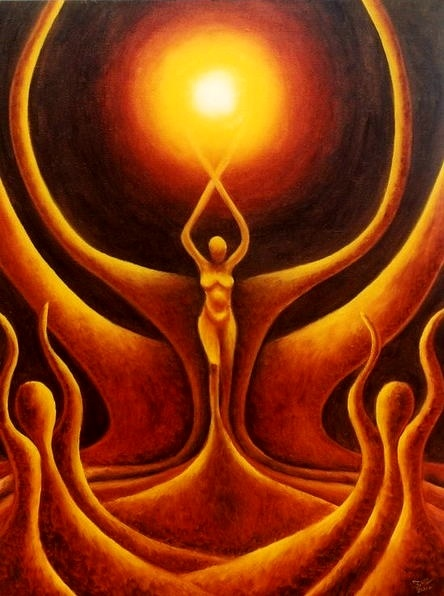
The Golden Bough, by Jeroen van Valkenburg, illustrates the artist's idea of reincarnation

Reincarnation is regularly mentioned in feature films, books, and popular music. The similar concept of transmigration has been used frequently to the point of cliché in the sense of people "switching bodies", in which the identity of a character transfers to another's body, either unilaterally or by exchange (e.g. Vice Versa), or to an animal (e.g. The Once and Future King) or object (e.g. The Picture of Dorian Gray). This concept has been used many times in various films, particularly in Indian cinema and television.

== Literature ==
Metempsychosis is the title of a work by the metaphysical poet John Donne, written in 1601. The poem, also known as the Infinitati Sacrum, consists of two parts, the "Epistle" and "The Progress of the Soule". In the first line of the latter part, Donne writes that he "sing[s] of the progresse of a deathlesse soule".

During the classical period of German literature, metempsychosis attracted much attention: Goethe played with the idea, and it was taken up more seriously by Lessing, who borrowed it from Charles Bonnet, and by Herder.

Reincarnation is a key plot device in Edgar Allan Poe's short story "Metzengerstein" (1832), in his "Morella" (1835) and "The Oval Portrait" (1842). Mark Twain mentions this concept in "A Word of Explanation" at the beginning of his "A Connecticut Yankee in King Arthur's Court." He comes across a "curious stranger" at Warwick Castle in England who shows him ancient armor that supposedly once belonged to the knights of the Round Table. He interrupts his musings by saying: "You know about transmigration of souls; do you know about transposition of epochs -- and bodies?" He later claims to have killed one of the knights himself ... with a bullet!

Metempsychosis recurs as a theme in James Joyce's modernist novel, Ulysses (1920). In Joycean fashion, the word famously appears, mispronounced by Molly Bloom, as "met him pike hoses."

J. D. Salinger's short story "Teddy" (Nine Stories, 1953) concerns reincarnation. An examination of transmigration in the arts is Philip K. Dick's novel The Transmigration of Timothy Archer.

John Brunner's story The Vitanuls speculates about a limited quantity of reincarnating souls and an unlimited population growth.

The bestselling suspense reincarnation series of M. J. Rose inspired the FOX-TV series Past Life, Chuck Palahniuk's book Diary centers around an artist whose reincarnated soul is repeatedly used in order to keep the residents of an island rich. American author Suzanne Weyn's romance novel, Reincarnation (2008), follows two lovers who keep searching for one another as they progress through the centuries. The Power of Five series by Anthony Horowitz involves children from 8000 B.C. returning as ordinary 21st century children.

In the novel "Donations to Clarity" by Noah Baird, the town sheriff is Elvis Presley incarnate.

=== Books on reincarnation ===
The belief in past lives and the use of perceptions and knowledge of these to help with one's current life is central to the New Age movement. Individuals within this movement who have spoken about reincarnation include Jane Roberts and Walter Semkiw, Patricia-Rochelle Diegel, Vicki Mackenzie and Carol Bowman.

Vicki Mackenzie's primary interest is to make Buddhist philosophy accessible to the general public. Her books on Buddhism and Reincarnation include: Reincarnation: The Boy Lama, Reborn in the West, Cave in the Snow and Why Buddhism? In 1988, Brian Weiss, an American psychiatrist, started using past life regression using hypnosis on his patient, later published, best-selling Many Lives, Many Masters.

Carol Bowman is an author, and the maintainer of a website dealing with Children's Past Lives, also the title of one of her books. In her books and on her website, she writes about cases of children who seem to recall past lives.

Other notable books and authors are:

- Many Lives, Many Masters by Brian Weiss
- Reliving Past Lives by Helen Wambach
- The Third Eye by T. Lobsang Rampa
- Falcon by Ada F Kay (A.J. Stewart)
- Origin of the Soul and the Purpose of Reincarnation, Born Again and Return of the Revolutionaries by Walter Semkiw, M.D.
- The Man Who Was Born Again, a 1921 novel by Paul Busson
- The Secrets of Witch Falls series by Vitelli Grigorowski.
- The Years of Rice and Salt, an alternate history novel by Kim Stanley Robinson.
- Dante's Equation is a 2003 science fiction novel by Jane Jensen, in which the laws of physics dictate which world in the multiverse you will next be reincarnated into, based loosely on your Sefirot and a sort of Karma or Saṃsāra.
- A Dog's Purpose by W. Bruce Cameron
- A Dog's Journey by W. Bruce Cameron

=== Comic ===
- Along with the Gods by Joo Ho-min
- Butsu Zone a manga by Hiroyuki Takei

== Films ==
Many feature films have made reference to reincarnation, including;

- The Man from Beyond (1922)
- The Road to Yesterday (1925)
- The Mummy (1932)
- She (1935)
- Professor Beware (1938)
- The Flying Deuces (1939)
- Here Comes Mr. Jordan (1941)
- I Married a Witch (1942)
- The Mummy's Ghost (1944)
- The Mummy's Curse (1944)
- Angel on My Shoulder (1946)
- The Return of October (1948)
- You Never Can Tell (1951)
- The Undead (1957)
- Vertigo (1958)
- The Haunted Palace (1963)
- Goodbye Charlie (1964)
- She (1965)
- Bedazzled (1967)
- 2001: A Space Odyssey (1968)
- The Vengeance of She (1968)
- On a Clear Day You Can See Forever (1970)
- Blacula (1972)
- Scream Blacula Scream (1973)
- Bram Stoker's Dracula (1973)
- The Reincarnation of Peter Proud (1975)
- Audrey Rose (1977)
- Heaven Can Wait (1978)
- All of Me (1984)
- Made in Heaven (1987)
- Mannequin (1987)
- Garfield: His 9 Lives (1988)
- Chances Are (1989)
- The Phantom of the Opera (1989)
- Omen IV: The Awakening (1991)
- Dead Again (1991)
- Switch (1991)
- Defending Your Life (1991)
- Bram Stoker's Dracula (1992)
- Please Save My Earth (1993)
- Jason Goes to Hell: The Final Friday (1993)
- Little Buddha (1993)
- Fluke (1995)
- Tale of the Mummy (1998)
- What Dreams May Come (1998)
- Jack Frost (1998)
- Bedazzled (2000)
- Down to Earth (2001)
- The Mummy Returns (2001)
- Birth (2004)
- The Eye 2 (2004)
- Reincarnation (2005)
- The Fountain (2006)
- Wendy Wu: Homecoming Warrior (2006)
- Love Story 2050 (2008)
- Enter the Void (2009)
- The Last Airbender (2010)
- Cloud Atlas (2012)
- I Origins (2014)
- Dracula Untold (2014)
- Jupiter Ascending (2015)
- Along with the Gods: The Two Worlds (2017)
- A Dog's Purpose (2017)
- Along with the Gods: The Last 49 Days (2018)
- A Dog's Journey (2019)
- Infinite (2021)

=== Indian film ===
Reincarnation is a common theme in contemporary Indian popular culture, particularly in Hindi cinema. The concept has appeared as a main theme in Indian films including:

- Mahal (1949)
- Madhumati (1958)
- Mooga Manasulu (1963)
- Nenjam Marappathillai (1963)
- Milan (1967)
- Neel Kamal (1968)
- Sonar Kella (1971)
- Mehbooba (1976)
- Karz (1980)
- Kudrat (1981)
- Enakkul Oruvan (1984)
- Bees Saal Baad (1988)
- Yuga Purusha (1989)
- Suryavanshi (1992)
- Prem Shakti (1994)
- Karan Arjun (1995)
- Kundun (1997)
- Hamesha (1997)
- "Mayilpeelikkavu"(1998)
- Ab Ke Baras (2002)
- Mr Ya Miss (2005)
- Valley of Flowers (2006)
- Om Shanti Om (2007)
- Dasavathaaram (2008)
- Karzzzz (2008)
- Love Story 2050 (2008)
- Arundhati (2009)
- "Anegan"(2012)
- Dangerous Ishhq (2012)
- Raabta (2017)
- Eega (2012)
- Shyam Singha Roy (2021)

== Video games ==
- Digital Devil Story: Megami Tensei (1987)
- Shin Megami Tensei (1992)
- Cosmology of Kyoto (1993)
- Terranigma (1995)
- The Granstream Saga (1997)
- Xenogears (1998)
- Omikron: The Nomad Soul (1999)
- Silent Hill (1999)
- Cubivore: Survival of the Fittest (2002)
- The Elder Scrolls III: Morrowind (2002)
- Castlevania: Aria of Sorrow (2003)
- Silent Hill 3 (2003)
- Shadow of the Colossus (2005)
- Silent Hill: Origins (2007)
- Inuyasha: Secret of the Divine Jewel (2007)
- Tales of Innocence (2007)
- Silent Hill: Shattered Memories (2009)
- BioShock 2 (2010)
- Shin Megami Tensei V (2021)
- Xenoblade Chronicles 3 (2022)
- The Sims 4: Life and Death (2024)

== Music ==
Popular songs or albums which refer to reincarnation include:

- Reincarnation by Broken Poets
- Reincarnation of a Love Bird by Paul Motian
- "The Reincarnation of Benjamin Breeg" by Iron Maiden
- The Reincarnation Song by Roy Zimmerman
- Eternal Caravan of Reincarnation by Santana
- The Reincarnation of Luna by My Life With The Thrill Kill Kult
- Mother and Child Reunion by Paul Simon
- Highwayman by The Highwaymen
- Tommy and "Glow Girl" by The Who
- "Galileo" by The Indigo Girls
- Metropolis Pt. 2: Scenes from a Memory by Dream Theater
- "Champagne Supernova" by Oasis
- "Jillian (I'd Give My Heart)" by Within Temptation, itself a recapturing of the central story of the Deverry cycle
- Reincarnation by Deine Lakaien
- "Snowed in at Wheeler Street" by Kate Bush feat. Elton John
- "El Paso City" by Marty Robbins
- "Next Lifetime" by Erykah Badu
- Re-Mix-In-A-Carnation by Wendy and Lisa
- "Where or When" by Rodgers and Hart
- "Cosmic Dancer" by T. Rex
- "Reincarnation" by Roger Miller, from the album The Return of Roger Miller
- "A National Acrobat" by Black Sabbath
- "Wings of an Eagle" by Russell Morris

== See also ==
- Isekai
- Mind uploading in fiction
