= A Dog's Perfect Christmas =

2026 Christmas film

- Release poster
- Directed by: Cathryn Michon
- Screenplay by: W. Bruce Cameron
- Based on: A Dog's Perfect Christmas by W. Bruce Cameron
- Produced by: Dan Angel; Michael G. Nathanson; Jane Charles
- Starring: Dennis Quaid; Milo Ventimiglia; Brooke Lena Johnson; Jennifer Tilly; Mary Steenburgen
- Music by: Rachel Portman
- Production company: Fezziwig Studios
- Distributed by: Netflix
- Release date: November 4, 2026
- Running time: 101 minutes
- Country: United States
- Language: English

A Dog's Perfect Christmas is a 2026 Christmas film based on the novel of the same name by W. Bruce Cameron. The film stars Dennis Quaid, Milo Ventimiglia, Brooke Lena Johnson, Jennifer Tilly and Mary Steenburgen.

A Dog's Perfect Christmas was released by Netflix on 4 November 2026.

== Cast ==
- Dennis Quaid as Sander
- Milo Ventimiglia as Hunter
- Brooke Lena Johnson as Ello
- Kathleen Rose Perkins as Juliana
- Jennifer Tilly as Lucille
- Thomas Haden Church as the voice of Winstead
- Mary Steenburgen as Claire
- Ethan Loomis as Sean
- Marissa Jaret Winokur as Nurse Miller
- Cathryn Michon as Mrs. O'Brien
- W. Bruce Cameron as Peter Altbef
- Karen LeBlanc as Allison
- Rebecca Staab as Barbara

=== Dog Actors ===
- Rufus as Baby Winstead the Basset Hound
- Candy and Jenkins as Adult Winstead the Basset Hound
- Charles, William and Harry as Ruby the Corgi
- Peaches as Mrs. O'Brien's Mastiff

Animals Provided by Canine Co Stars of Canada

- Animal Coordinator, Bonnie Judd
- Animal Trainers Tiffany Carson and Ryan Judd
- Assistant Animal Trainer, Brylee Brand

Dedicated to Tucker Michon Cameron

== Production ==
The film is based on the novel of the same name by W. Bruce Cameron. The film is directed by Cathryn Michon from a script by Cameron and Michon. The pair had previously also collaborated on A Dog's Purpose (2017) and A Dog's Journey (2019). Dan Angel, Michael G. Nathanson, and Jane Charles are producers.

The cast is led by Dennis Quaid, Milo Ventimiglia, Brooke Lena Johnson, Jennifer Tilly and Mary Steenburgen, with Kathleen Rose Perkins and Thomas Haden Church as the voice of Winstead. Steenburgen is also the narrator on a 2026 audiobook of the story. Rachel Portman composed the film's score.

== Release ==
The film was released on Netflix on November 4, 2026.

== Reception ==
On review aggregator Rotten Tomatoes, the film holds an approval rating of 33% based on 12 reviews, with an average rating of 4.5/10.
