= List of 2019 box office number-one films in Ecuador =

This is a list of films which placed number-one at the weekend box office in Ecuador during 2019.

== Number-one films ==
#	Weekend end date	Film	Box office	Openings in the top ten	Ref.
1	January 6, 2019	Mortal Engines	$124,428		
2	January 13, 2019	Dragon Ball Super: Broly	$1,329,009		
3	January 20, 2019	Dragon Ball Super: Broly	$314,224		
4	January 27, 2019	Spider-Man: Into the Spider-Verse	$8,170		
5	February 3, 2019	Escape Room	$81,256		
6	February 10, 2019	Escape Room	$51,495		
7	February 17, 2019	How to Train Your Dragon: The Hidden World	$527,164		
8	February 24, 2019	How to Train Your Dragon: The Hidden World	$368,145		
9	March 3, 2019	A Dog's Way Home	$112,429		
10	March 10, 2019	A Dog's Way Home	$94,943		
11	March 17, 2019	How to Train Your Dragon: The Hidden World	$78,737		
12	March 24, 2019	Five Feet Apart	$94,473		
13	March 31, 2019	Us	$72,223		
14	April 7, 2019	Five Feet Apart	$38,912		
15	April 14, 2019	After	$112,259		
16	April 21, 2019	Us	$11,954		
17	April 28, 2019	Five Feet Apart	$1,229		
18	May 5, 2019	Little	$62,390		
19	May 12, 2019	The Hustle	$85,897		
20	May 19, 2019	A Dog's Journey	$215,871		
21	May 26, 2019	A Dog's Journey	$172,822		
22	June 2, 2019	A Dog's Journey	$94,975		
23	June 9, 2019	A Dog's Journey	$44,461		
24	June 16, 2019	Men in Black: International	$206,501		
25	June 23, 2019	Men in Black: International	$96,338		
26	June 30, 2019	The Secret Life of Pets 2	$232,161		
27	July 7, 2019	Spider-Man: Far From Home	$997,906		
28	July 14, 2019	Spider-Man: Far From Home	$575,213		
29	July 21, 2019	Spider-Man: Far From Home	$227,524		
30	July 28, 2019	Spider-Man: Far From Home	$164,566		
31	August 4, 2019	Fast & Furious Presents: Hobbs & Shaw	$588,680		
32	August 11, 2019	Fast & Furious Presents: Hobbs & Shaw	$417,434		
33	August 18, 2019	Fast & Furious Presents: Hobbs & Shaw	$169,048		
34	August 25, 2019	The Angry Birds Movie 2	$116,912		
35	September 1, 2019	The Angry Birds Movie 2	$93,112		
36	September 8, 2019	The Angry Birds Movie 2	$48,960		
37	September 15, 2019	Yesterday	$61,573		
38	September 22, 2019	Yesterday	$34,524		
39	September 29, 2019	Good Boys	$20,545		
40	October 6, 2019	Abominable	$145,844		
41	October 13, 2019	Abominable	$84,902		
42	October 20, 2019	Abominable	$46,518		
43	October 27, 2019	The Addams Family	$155,313		
44	November 3, 2019	The Addams Family	$173,507		
45	November 10, 2019	The Addams Family	$64,679		
46	November 17, 2019	The Addams Family	$42,726		
47	November 24, 2019	47 Meters Down: Uncaged	$16,957		
48	December 1, 2019	47 Meters Down: Uncaged	$5,984		
49	December 8, 2019	Knives Out	$43,558		
50	December 15, 2019	Knives Out	$24,115		
51	December 22, 2019	Last Christmas	$55,411		
52	December 29, 2019	Jumanji: The Next Level	$513,603		

== See also ==
- 2019 in Ecuador

Preceded by 2018 Box office number-one films	Box office number-one films 2019	Succeeded by 2020 Box office number-one films
