= A Dog's Way Home =

2019 film directed by Charles Martin Smith

- Theatrical release poster
- Directed by: Charles Martin Smith
- Screenplay by: W. Bruce Cameron; Cathryn Michon
- Based on: A Dog's Way Home; 2017 novel by W. Bruce Cameron
- Produced by: Gavin Polone
- Starring: Ashley Judd; Jonah Hauer-King; Edward James Olmos; Alexandra Shipp; Barry Watson; Wes Studi; Bryce Dallas Howard; Shelby
- Cinematography: Peter Menzies Jr.
- Edited by: Debra Neil-Fisher; David S. Clark; Sabrina Plisco
- Music by: Mychael Danna
- Production companies: Columbia Pictures; Bona Film Group
- Distributed by: Sony Pictures Releasing
- Release dates: January 3, 2019 (limited release): January 11, 2019 (United States)
- Running time: 96 minutes
- Countries: China; United States
- Language: English
- Budget: $18 million
- Box office: $80.7 million

A Dog's Way Home is a 2019 adventure comedy drama film directed by Charles Martin Smith from a screenplay by W. Bruce Cameron and Cathryn Michon, based on the 2017 novel of the same name by Cameron. The film stars Bryce Dallas Howard, Ashley Judd, Edward James Olmos, former dog actor Shelby, Alexandra Shipp, Wes Studi, Barry Watson, and Jonah Hauer-King. The film follows a dog named Bella (voiced by Howard and acted by Shelby) who travels more than 400 miles to find her owner.

It was released in the United States on January 11, 2019, to mixed reviews from critics and grossed $80 million worldwide.

== Plot ==
In a neighborhood in Denver, Colorado, a mother stray dog and her three newborn puppies live peacefully with a colony of feral cats in an abandoned house. One day, Animal Control officers discover the animals and capture most of the cats, two of the puppies, and the mother dog. Luckily, Bella is saved by a mother cat, who then adopts and raises her. Lucas Ray and his friend Olivia, two local residents who visit often to feed the cats, find Bella in the old house along with many kittens and the mother cat. He names the dog Bella and takes her home to live with him and his veteran mother, Terri.

Over the years, Lucas plays with and takes care of Bella. However, Lucas also continues to feed the cats at the old house, putting himself in the crosshairs of Günter Beckenbauer, who intends to demolish the house. He calls the city about the cats who live there, which delays the demolition. Vengeful, Günter notifies Animal Control that Bella is a pitbull because in Denver, pitbulls were illegal, due to their reputation as a dangerous breed. That evening, overzealous animal control officer Chuck Millits comes by to warn Lucas that if he finds Bella on the street, he will impound her.

The next day, when Bella gets out to chase a squirrel, Lucas catches up to her and prepares to take her home, but Chuck confiscates Bella and takes her into the local animal shelter. Lucas picks Bella up, pays a fine, and is allowed to take her home, but he is warned that if Bella is captured again, she will be euthanized. To avoid this, Lucas sends Bella to live with Olivia's aunt and uncle in Farmington, New Mexico, until he and his mother can find another home outside of Denver's urban limits.

However, Bella misses Lucas and leaves Farmington to begin a 400-mile journey home, which will take two and a half years to complete. During Bella's journey, she befriends an orphaned cougar cub, whom she names "Big Kitten". Bella and Big Kitten encounter many ordeals together, including being hunted by a pack of coyotes, but a group of men help Bella and frighten the coyotes away. The three men give Bella food at their campsite and upon learning who her owner is, try to call Lucas, only to be scared away by the sudden arrival of Big Kitten.

During the winter, Bella helps rescue a man buried in an avalanche and is taken in by two men. Next winter, she reaches a small town, where she is taken in by a homeless veteran named Axel until he soon dies in spring while Bella is tethered to him and Bella then gets unchained by a boy saving her from dehydration. Back in the wilderness, Bella is attacked by coyotes again, but Big Kitten, now fully grown, returns and intervenes, successfully fighting off the coyotes. After encountering further challenges, Bella finally makes it back to Denver, and she bids Big Kitten farewell before they part ways. After briefly reuniting with the cat that looked after her as a puppy and also bidding her farewell, Bella reaches the city's VA hospital, where she joyfully reunites with Lucas, Terri, and Olivia. Lucas prepares to take her to the vet to treat an injury she received when struck by a car, but when Lucas, Terri, and Lucas's friends bring Bella outside, Chuck arrives with several police officers, including police captain Mica.

Chuck claims that he needs to confiscate Bella again, with the threat to have Lucas and anyone who interferes arrested otherwise. Captain Mica states that he enforces the law, which states that Bella must be impounded, but Lucas and Terri stand up for Bella and point out he cannot confiscate her as the VA hospital is federal property, and thus is not technically part of Denver. Captain Mica allows Lucas to keep Bella as he has no jurisdiction.

Chuck threatens to pull Lucas over if he sees Bella leave the premises, but Captain Mica pulls him from public field duty for his over-zealousness and the number of complaints against him. He then orders the police officers not to pull anybody over just to impound a dog. Lucas and Olivia manage to move into a new house in Golden with Bella, where they allow pitbulls. Meanwhile, Big Kitten is now revealed to be a mother herself as she and her cub watch over the city of Denver.

== Cast ==
- Bryce Dallas Howard voice acts as Bella
  - Shelby physically acts as Bella
- Jonah Hauer-King as Lucas Ray
- Ashley Judd as Terri Ray
- Edward James Olmos as Axel
- Alexandra Shipp as Olivia
- John Cassini as Chuck Millits
- Wes Studi as Captain Mica
- Brian Markinson as Günter Beckenbauer
- Chris Bauer as Kurch
- Barry Watson as Gavin
- Tammy Gillis as Officer Leon

== Production ==
On November 7, 2017, Ashley Judd, Edward James Olmos and several others were cast in the film. On January 24, 2018, Barry Watson was added to play Gavin. Filming began in Vancouver, British Columbia on October 16, 2017, lasting through December 15.

== Release ==
The film was released theatrically in the United States on January 11, 2019, by Sony Pictures.

Sony spent $18.8 million on the production of the film.

It was also released on Blu-ray on April 9, 2019, by Sony Pictures, while the digital copy was released on December 31, 2020.

== Reception ==
=== Box office ===
A Dog's Way Home grossed $42 million in the United States and Canada, and $38.7 million in other territories, for a total worldwide gross of $80.7 million, against a production budget of $18 million.

In the United States and Canada, A Dog's Way Home was released alongside the openings of Replicas and The Upside, as well as the wide expansion of On the Basis of Sex, and was projected to gross $9–10 million from 3,090 theaters in its opening weekend. It made $3.3 million on its first day, including $535,000 from Thursday night previews. It went on to have a debut of $11.3 million, finishing third at the box office, behind The Upside and holdover Aquaman. In its second weekend the film made $7.1 million, finishing sixth.

=== Critical response ===
On review aggregator Rotten Tomatoes, the film holds an approval rating of 59% based on 79 reviews with an average rating of 5.4/10. The website's critical consensus reads "A Dog's Way Home may not quite be a family-friendly animal drama fan's best friend, but this canine adventure is no less heartwarming for its familiarity." On Metacritic, which uses a weighted average, the film has a score of 50 out of 100, based on 14 critics, indicating "mixed or average" reviews. Audiences polled by CinemaScore gave the film an average grade of "A−" on an A+ to F scale, while those at PostTrak gave it 3.5 out of 5 stars.

Chris Nashawaty of Entertainment Weekly called the film "heartwarming, mildly funny, and occasionally thrilling without ever being anything more than just fine." Tomris Laffly, writing for RogerEbert.com, called it "a good dog movie with its heart in the right place" and gave it 3 out of 4 stars. Courtney Howard of Variety wrote: "For every shameless trick the filmmakers employ to pluck our heartstrings, resonant chords are struck elsewhere, teaching audiences about family, the power of unconditional love, and the ripple effects of compassion." Paul Byrnes of The Sydney Morning Herald gave it 3/5 stars and wrote: "There's not much variation on the old themes here. What's new is the film's definition of community and family."

Kennith Rosario of The Hindu was more critical, writing: "If a dog has to make a 400-mile journey across more than two years, there's enough scope to go beyond regurgitation of old dog film tropes." Jude Dry of IndieWire gave it a D grade, writing: "This franchise should follow its own advice: Find a purpose, a way home, or show yourself the doggy door."

== See also ==
- A Dog's Journey (2019 film)
- A Dog's Purpose (2017 film)
- The Adventures of Milo and Otis
- Bobbie the Wonder Dog
- Fluke (1995 film)
- Homeward Bound: The Incredible Journey
- Quigley (2003 film)
- Napoleon (1995 film)
- Cats & Dogs
