= A Dog's Purpose =

A Dog's Purpose may refer to:

- A Dog's Purpose (novel), a 2010 novel by W. Bruce Cameron
- A Dog's Purpose (film), a 2017 American adventure drama film, based on the novel
