= A Dog's Courage =

A Dog's Courage may refer to:

- A Dog's Courage (book) – 2021 sequel to the novel: A Dog’s Way Home
- Underdog (2018 film) – 2018 film by Oh Sung-yoon and Lee Chun-baek
