= Muffin Top: A Love Story =

- Film poster
- Directed by: Cathryn Michon
- Written by: Cathryn Michon; W. Bruce Cameron
- Based on: The Grrl Genius Guide to Sex (With Other People) by Cathryn Michon
- Produced by: Cathryn Michon; W. Bruce Cameron; Tom Rooker
- Starring: Cathryn Michon; David Arquette; Marissa Jaret Winokur; Diedrich Bader; Melissa Peterman
- Cinematography: Tom Clancey
- Edited by: Yoshio Kohashi
- Music by: Michelle Featherstone
- Production company: Cameron Productions
- Distributed by: MarVista Entertainment
- Release date: November 2014
- Country: United States
- Language: English

Muffin Top: A Love Story is a 2014 American romantic comedy directed by Cathryn Michon, who also starred in the film. The film's script was written by Michon with her husband W. Bruce Cameron. It is based on her 2004 novel The Grrl Genius Guide to Sex (With Other People), which was partially based on her life. Muffin Top was Michon's second directorial effort, after 2007's Cook Off!, though that film would not be released until 2017. The film stars Michon as a woman who must re-enter the dating world after her husband (played by Diedrich Bader) leaves her for a younger woman. It had its world debut on October 18, 2014, at the Carmel International Film Festival. Distribution for the film was handled by the on-demand movie distribution website Tugg, which allowed Michon to show her film in areas with high enough demand. Muffin Top was also released via VOD.

== Plot ==
Suzanne (Cathryn Michon) is a professor of Women's Studies Pop Culture at Malibu University. On her birthday her husband Michael (Diedrich Bader) surprises her by saying that he's divorcing her in favor of his co-worker Jessica (Haylie Duff), prompting her to go on a quest to find herself.

== Cast ==
- Cathryn Michon as Suzanne Nicholson
- Marissa Jaret Winokur as Elise
- Diedrich Bader as Michael Nicholson
- Jill Holden as Dr. Nadja Borman
- Haylie Duff as Jessica
- Jane Morris as Dr. Khalsa
- Wayne Federman as Hayes Greenberg
- Michael Hawley as Jarod
- Dot-Marie Jones as Christina
- Cristine Rose as Deborah
- Melissa Peterman as Kim
- Michael Helpi as Barnaby
- Gary Anthony Williams as Gregory David Gregory
- Victoria Bohush as Andrea
- Dominique Dorian as Sophie
- David Arquette as Cameron Scott
- Meredith Scott Lynn as Katey
- Tucker as BooBoo

== Production ==
Filming for Muffin Top took place in Hollywood, California over a four-week period with a budget of under $1 million. While choosing the film's music Michon decided to only use music composed by female performers and she has billed Muffin Top as the "first rom-com to have an all-female soundtrack and score" and as a "body image romantic comedy".

== Reception ==
Critical reception has been mixed. The Oakland Press wrote a favorable review for Muffin Top, stating that "most readers have probably never heard of this movie, which I think is a shame." The Windy City Times commented upon the film's central focus on women, which they felt was "one of the reasons The Babadook and why actor-writer-director Cathryn Michon's comedy Muffin Top: A Love Story are such refreshing finds."

The Star Tribune wrote a mixed review, criticizing it for utilizing vignettes while also encouraging viewers to support the flawed lead heroine while laughing at her unbearable dates. However they also stated that while the film did not match up to female oriented films like Bridesmaids, it was also "tolerably funny" and deserved a B for effort. A reviewer for Chicagoist panned Muffin Top and included it in their "worst of the year" list, writing "Made with obvious good intentions, the indie comedy Muffin Top: A Love Story has little else going for it. Its basic plea for women to not allow their self-esteem to be damaged by unrealistic, media-enforced notions of an ideal body is a welcome message. Unfortunately, it is delivered via a frequently irritating and laugh-free feature made almost bearable by some talented cast members."
