= Shelby (dog) =

Dog actor (2016)

- Species: Canis lupus familiaris
- Breed: Rottweiler–German Shepherd
- Sex: Female
- Born: April 10, 2016 (age 10) possibly Nashville, Tennessee (Note: It is implied she was born in Nashville, Tennessee, since she was found in a landfill there, but it isn't confirmed.)
- Years active: 2017–present (Note: This combines both her acting, (including her training), and therapy dog career.)
- Known for: Playing Bella in A Dog's Way Home
- Owner: Debbie Pearl
- Residence: United States

Shelby (born April 10, 2016) is the dog who played Bella in the movie A Dog's Way Home. Shelby was found in a landfill before being taken to a shelter. She was then trained by Debbie Pearl to act in the movie. Debbie adopted her after the film's production and she is now a therapy dog. Shelby was featured on a cast Q&A, Inside Edition, and the Los Angeles Times.

== Life ==
Shelby was found in a landfill, scavenging for food, before being taken to a shelter in Nashville, Tennessee on June 8, 2017. It took a national internet search to find a dog actor for the movie A Dog's Way Home, more specifically a rescue dog to better convey the message of the film.

Shelby was chosen and then trained by Debbie Pearl for 3 months before the film's production, which involved a variety of tests to prove she was eligible enough for acting as the main character of the film, Bella. After the film's production, she was adopted by Debbie and is now a therapy dog for disabled children.

Shelby was in a cast Q&A with Bryce Dallas Howard and W. Bruce Cameron, and she was featured on Inside Edition. She was also featured on the Los Angeles Times.

== See also ==
- List of individual dogs
- List of animal actors
