= List of 2015 box office number-one films in Ecuador =

This is a list of films which placed number-one at the weekend box office in Ecuador during 2015.

== Number-one films ==
#	Weekend end date	Film	Box office	Openings in the top ten	Ref.
1	January 4, 2015	Big Hero 6	$457,083	Exodus: Gods and Kings #2, Paddington #5, The Giver #6	
2	January 11, 2015	Big Hero 6	$264,588	Fury #4, This Is Where I Leave You #6, The Haunting of Helena #9	
3	January 18, 2015	Penguins of Madagascar	$531,771	Seventh Son #2	
4	January 25, 2015	Penguins of Madagascar	$373,376	Taken 3 #2, Unbroken #6, Foxcatcher #10	
5	February 1, 2015	Taken 3	$260,500	Annie #3, The November Man #5	
6	February 8, 2015	The SpongeBob Movie: Sponge Out of Water	$482,779	Jupiter Ascending #2, Ouija #6, Birdman #7	
7	February 15, 2015	Fifty Shades of Grey	$506,926	Into the Woods #4	
8	February 22, 2015	Fifty Shades of Grey	$244,192	Tinker Bell and the Legend of the NeverBeast #2, American Sniper #4, The Theory of Everything #7, The Imitation Game #8	
9	March 1, 2015	Kingsman: The Secret Service	$164,628	The Seventh Dwarf #7, Selma #10	
10	March 8, 2015	Focus	$162,601	Chappie #4, McFarland, USA #10	
11	March 15, 2015	Cinderella	$610,537	The Boy Next Door #8	
12	March 22, 2015	Cinderella	$384,801	The Divergent Series: Insurgent #2, Inherent Vice #10	
13	March 29, 2015	Home	$281,899	Minuscule: Valley of the Lost Ants #4	
14	April 5, 2015	Furious 7	$1,638,082	Hector and the Search for Happiness #4	
15	April 12, 2015	Furious 7	$1,088,840	Thunder and the House of Magic #3, The Babadook #5, Still Alice #7	
16	April 19, 2015	Furious 7	$627,417	Paul Blart: Mall Cop 2 #2, Run All Night #3, Monkey Kingdom #6, Left Behind #7	
17	April 26, 2015	Furious 7	$312,565	The Lazarus Effect #5, Love of My Loves #6	
18	May 3, 2015	Avengers: Age of Ultron	$2,076,390		
19	May 10, 2015	Avengers: Age of Ultron	$753,279	The Cobbler #3, Ida #8	
20	May 17, 2015	Avengers: Age of Ultron	$519,304	Mad Max: Fury Road #2, The Second Best Exotic Marigold Hotel #6, The Gunman #9	
21	May 24, 2015	Tomorrowland	$324,061	The Possession of Michael King #4, Darker Than Night #7	
22	May 31, 2015	San Andreas	$581,811	Maya the Bee Movie #5, Child 44 #8, St. Vincent #10	
23	June 7, 2015	San Andreas	$470,721	Insidious: Chapter 3 #2, Pinocchio #4, Spy #5	
24	June 14, 2015	Jurassic World	$808,781		
25	June 21, 2015	Inside Out	$739,286	Dragon Ball Z: Resurrection 'F' #3	
26	June 28, 2015	Inside Out	$608,008	Poltergeist #3, The Age of Adaline #7	
27	July 5, 2015	Terminator Genisys	$443,530	Clown #6, The Crypt #8	
28	July 12, 2015	Minions	$965,635	Dark Awakening #6	
29	July 19, 2015	Minions	$668,583	Ant-Man #2, Dark Places #7, 13 Sins #9	
30	July 26, 2015	Pixels	$355,619	Paper Towns #4, The Gallows #5, The Devil's Hand #8	
31	August 2, 2015	Mission: Impossible – Rogue Nation	$346,173	Hot Pursuit #7	
32	August 9, 2015	Fantastic Four	$325,158	All Creatures Big And Small #5, Entourage #10	
33	August 16, 2015	Fantastic Four	$182,348	The Vatican Tapes #4, Vacation #7, The Loft #9	
34	August 23, 2015	Fantastic Four	$129,781	Ribbit #2, The Man from U.N.C.L.E. #4	
35	August 30, 2015	Hitman: Agent 47	$106,087	Ted 2 #2, Sinister 2 #5, War Room #7	
36	September 6, 2015	Hitman: Agent 47	$106,087		
37	September 13, 2015	The 33	$105,690	Trainwreck #9, Magic Mike XXL #10	
38	September 20, 2015	Maze Runner: The Scorch Trials	$354,614	Everest #3, Demonic #4	
39	September 27, 2015	Hotel Transylvania 2	$709,624	Black Mass #6	
40	October 4, 2015	Hotel Transylvania 2	$594,365		
41	October 11, 2015	Hotel Transylvania 2	$471,641		
42	October 18, 2015	Hotel Transylvania 2	$202,025	Crimson Peak #3, The Little Prince #5, Bridge of Spies #6	
43	October 25, 2015	Goosebumps	$177,955	Paranormal Activity: The Ghost Dimension #2	
44	November 1, 2015	Goosebumps	$131,646		
45	November 8, 2015	Goosebumps	$88,683	The Visit #3	
46	November 15, 2015	Spectre	$295,922	Scouts Guide to the Zombie Apocalypse #3, Abzurdah #8	
47	November 22, 2015	Spectre	$141,666		
48	November 29, 2015	Victor Frankenstein	$120,313	Lusers, los amigos no se eligen #6, Suffragette #8	
49	December 6, 2015	The Good Dinosaur	$458,418	Krampus #3, The Clan #5	
50	December 13, 2015	The Good Dinosaur	$284,114	In the Heart of the Sea #2, Love the Coopers #6, Huevos: Little Rooster's Egg-cellent Adventure #7, The Night Before #8	
51	December 20, 2015	Star Wars: Episode VII - The Force Awakens	$993,460		
No box office data for the weekend of 27 December 2015.					

== See also ==
- 2015 in Ecuador

Preceded by 2014 Box office number-one films	Box office number-one films 2015	Succeeded by 2016 Box office number-one films
