= List of 2017 box office number-one films in Ecuador =

This is a list of films which placed number-one at the weekend box office in Ecuador during 2017.

== Number-one films ==
#	Weekend end date	Film	Box office	Openings in the top ten	Ref.
1	January 8, 2017	No box office data for the weekend of 8 January 2017.			
2	January 15, 2017	No box office data for the weekend of 15 January 2017.			
3	January 22, 2017	Sing	$37,373		
4	January 29, 2017	Resident Evil: The Final Chapter	$423,114		
5	February 5, 2017	Resident Evil: The Final Chapter	$238,758		
6	February 12, 2017	Fifty Shades Darker	$265,210		
7	February 19, 2017	Fifty Shades Darker	$162,764		
8	February 26, 2017	A Dog's Purpose	$175,430		
9	March 5, 2017	A Dog's Purpose	$164,397		
10	March 12, 2017	A Dog's Purpose	$125,953		
11	March 19, 2017	Split	$83,118		
12	March 26, 2017	Power Rangers	$228,410		
13	April 2, 2017	The Boss Baby	$433,289		
14	April 9, 2017	The Boss Baby	$371,971		
15	April 16, 2017	The Fate of the Furious	$2,082,485		
16	April 23, 2017	The Fate of the Furious	$790,496		
17	April 30, 2017	The Fate of the Furious	$339,099		
18	May 7, 2017	The Fate of the Furious	$188,149		
19	May 14, 2017	The Fate of the Furious	$96,250		
20	May 21, 2017	The Fate of the Furious	$53,084		
21	May 28, 2017	Get Out	$16,647		
22	June 4, 2017	Get Out	$5,651		
23	June 11, 2017	The Mummy	$418,622		
24	June 18, 2017	The Mummy	$213,496		
25	June 25, 2017	The Mummy	$126,542		
26	July 2, 2017	Despicable Me 3	$778,294		
27	July 9, 2017	Spider-Man: Homecoming	$1,001,664		
28	July 16, 2017	Spider-Man: Homecoming	$501,474		
29	July 23, 2017	Spider-Man: Homecoming	$225,451		
30	July 30, 2017	Spider-Man: Homecoming	$140,081		
31	August 6, 2017	War for the Planet of the Apes	$380,694		
32	August 13, 2017	The Emoji Movie	$291,716		
33	August 20, 2017	The Emoji Movie	$115,556		
34	August 27, 2017	The Dark Tower	$94,863		
35	September 3, 2017	The Dark Tower	$74,157		
36	September 10, 2017	Girls Trip	$47,646		
37	September 17, 2017	The Nut Job 2: Nutty by Nature	$50,548		
38	September 24, 2017	American Made	$120,561		
39	October 1, 2017	American Made	$68,051		
40	October 8, 2017	Blade Runner 2049	$106,891		
41	October 15, 2017	Flatliners	$84,123		
42	October 22, 2017	Happy Death Day	$173,950		
43	October 29, 2017	Jigsaw	$164,151		
44	November 5, 2017	Jigsaw	$191,269		
45	November 12, 2017	Jigsaw	$86,811		
46	November 19, 2017	Jigsaw	$30,271		
47	November 26, 2017	Victoria & Abdul	$7,185		
48	December 3, 2017	Victoria & Abdul	$2,451		
49	December 10, 2017	Wonder	$115,570		
50	December 17, 2017	Wonder	$83,308		
51	December 24, 2017	No box office data for the weekend of 24 December 2017.			
52	December 31, 2017	Jumanji: Welcome to the Jungle	$347,766		

== See also ==
- 2017 in Ecuador

Preceded by 2016 Box office number-one films	Box office number-one films 2017	Succeeded by 2018 Box office number-one films
