= Markie Post =

American actress (1950–2021)

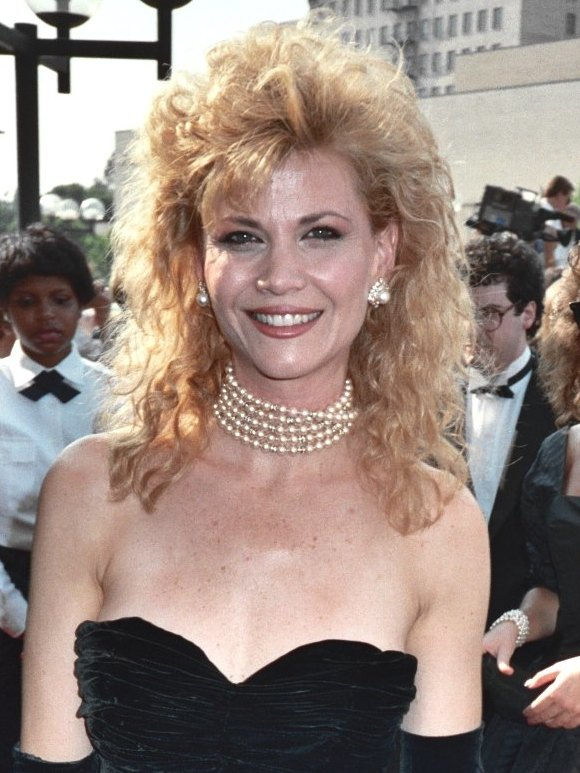
- Post at the 1988 Emmy Awards
- Born: Marjorie Armstrong Post; November 4, 1950; Palo Alto, California, U.S.
- Died: August 7, 2021 (aged 70); Los Angeles, California, U.S.
- Education: Lewis & Clark College (BA)
- Occupation: Actress
- Years active: 1978–2019
- Known for: The Fall Guy; Night Court; Hearts Afire
- Spouses: Stephen Knox (m. 1971; div. 1972) Michael A. Ross (m. 1982)
- Children: 2
- Father: Richard F. Post
- Relatives: Descendants of Robert Coe

Marjorie Armstrong Post (November 4, 1950 – August 7, 2021), known professionally as Markie Post, was an American actress. Her best known roles include bail bondswoman Terri Michaels in The Fall Guy on ABC from 1982 to 1985; public defender Christine Sullivan on the NBC sitcom Night Court from 1985 to 1992; Georgie Anne Lahti Hartman on the CBS sitcom Hearts Afire from 1992 to 1995; and Barbara ‘Bunny’ Fletcher, the mother of Detective Erin Lindsay (Sophia Bush), on the NBC drama series Chicago P.D. from 2014 to 2017.

== Early life ==
Post was born in Palo Alto, California, on November 4, 1950. Her father, Richard F. Post, worked as a physicist; her mother, Marylee (Armstrong) Post, was a poet. The second of the couple's three children, she and her two siblings were raised in Stanford and Walnut Creek. She attended Las Lomas High School where she was a cheerleader. Post then attended Lewis & Clark College in Portland, Oregon, and briefly attended Pomona College in California before returning to Lewis & Clark to earn her Bachelor of Arts degree.

== Career ==
Prior to acting, Post worked in the production staff on several game shows. She began her career with the production crew of the Tom Kennedy version of Split Second. She also served as associate producer of CBS's Double Dare and as a card dealer on NBC's Card Sharks. Later, after achieving fame as an actress, she played various game shows as a celebrity guest, including The Match Game-Hollywood Squares Hour, Super Password, The (New) $25,000 Pyramid, and The $100,000 Pyramid. She helped a contestant win the $100,000 grand prize in a November 1987 tournament episode of The $100,000 Pyramid.

Post's early acting credits include a 1979 appearance as a red spandex wearing femme fatale in the science-fiction series Buck Rogers in the 25th Century. She also appeared on a 1979 episode of the detective show Barnaby Jones, on a 1980 episode of Eight is Enough, the pilot episode of Simon & Simon in 1981, the season two premiere of The Greatest American Hero, two episodes of The A-Team (as two different characters: the 1983 episode "The Only Church in Town" and the 1984 episode "Hot Styles"), and a guest spot on the popular ABC Saturday night romance drama The Love Boat. She appeared as Diane Chambers' best friend in the sitcom Cheers, before eventually becoming a regular on the ABC action drama The Fall Guy. She left The Fall Guy, for her most popular role as Christine Sullivan, the tightly wound public defender on the NBC TV comedy series Night Court; the character was the foil to John Laroquette's misogynistic assistant district attorney, Dan Fielding, and the eventual love interest for Judge Harry Stone (Harry Anderson). She remained with the show from the third season until the end in 1992. She played Georgie Anne Lahti Hartman on the comedy series Hearts Afire, co-starring John Ritter. Post also had recurring guest-star roles on The District and on Scrubs as the mother of Dr. Elliot Reid.

Her film credits include There's Something About Mary (1998), in which Post played Mary's mother. She played a call girl and dominatrix in the 1988 TV movie Tricks of the Trade opposite Cindy Williams, and a singer in Glitz with Jimmy Smits, based on the novel by Elmore Leonard. She also had a starring role in NBC's 1995 movie Visitors in the Night. She appeared as reporter Christine Merriweather in the 2007 improvisational comedy film (released in 2017) Cook Off!. She appeared in the 30 Rock episode "The One with the Cast of Night Court" playing herself when Harry Anderson, Charles Robinson, and she staged a mock reunion of the Night Court cast.

Post was the voice of June Darby on the animated robot superhero TV series Transformers: Prime. She appeared as recurring character Barbara 'Bunny' Fletcher in the first four seasons of Chicago P.D.

== Personal life ==
From 1971 to 1972, Post was married to Stephen Knox, whom she met at Lewis & Clark College. She later married actor and writer Michael A. Ross, with whom she had two daughters.

== Death ==
Post died at the age of 70 at her home in Los Angeles, on August 7, 2021; she had been suffering from cancer.

== Filmography ==
=== Film ===
| Year | Title | Role | Notes |
|---|---|---|---|
| 1981 | Gangster Wars | Chris Brennan | Film debut |
| 1998 | There's Something About Mary | Sheila Jensen | |
| 2007 | Cook Off! | Christine Merriweather | Released in 2017 |
| 2014 | Muffin Top: A Love Story | Linda | |
| 2017 | Sweet Sweet Summertime | Lila Burns | |
| 2017 | Camp Cool Kids | Euginia | |
| 2018 | Keep the Gaslight Burning | Mrs. Maxwell | Short film |

=== Television ===
| Year | Title | Role | Notes |
|---|---|---|---|
| 1978 | Frankie and Annette: The Second Time Around | Denise | TV movie |
| 1979 | CHiPs | Roberta | Episode: "Rally 'Round the Bank" |
| 1979 | Barnaby Jones | Linda Woods | Episode: "Master of Deception" |
| 1979 | The Incredible Hulk | Pamela Norris | Episode: "The Confession" |
| 1979 | The Lazarus Syndrome | Lauren Place | Episode: "A Brutal Assault" |
| 1979 | Buck Rogers in the 25th Century | Joella Cameron | 2 episodes |
| 1979 | Hart to Hart | Sandy | Episode: "Cop Out" |
| 1980 | B.J. and the Bear | Valerie Wood | Episode: "Siege" |
| 1980 | House Calls | Linda | Episode: "A Slight Case of Quarantine" |
| 1980 | Eight Is Enough | Kerry | Episode: "The Commitment" |
| 1980 | Semi-Tough | Barbara Jane Bookman | 4 episodes |
| 1981 | The Gangster Chronicles | Chris Brennan | Television Miniseries; 13 episodes |
| 1981 | The Greatest American Hero | Deborah Dante | Episode: "The Two-Hundred-Mile-an-Hour Fast Ball" |
| 1981 | Simon & Simon | Carolyn Perry | Episode: "Details at Eleven" |
| 1981 | McClain's Law | Linda Smith | Episode: "Requiem for a Narc" |
| 1982 | Massarati and the Brain | Julie Ramsdell | Television movie |
| 1982 | Not Just Another Affair | Jan Thacker | Television movie |
| 1982–1983 | The Love Boat | Doris Holden/Dee Dee/Donna Baker | 2 episodes |
| 1982–1985 | The Fall Guy | Terri Michaels | Series regular; 64 episodes (1982–1985) |
| 1983 | Six Pack | Sally Leadbetter | Television movie |
| 1983 | Matt Houston | Courtney Garner | Episode: "A Novel Way to Die" |
| 1983 | Cheers | Heather Landon | Episode: "Just Three Friends" |
| 1983 | The Match Game-Hollywood Squares Hour | Herself | 5 episodes |
| 1983–1984 | Fantasy Island | Amy Marshall/Doreen Murphy | 2 episodes |
| 1983-1984 | The A-Team | Rina/Leslie Becktall/Sister Teresa | 2 episodes |
| 1983-1988 | The New $25,000 Pyramid | Herself | Recurring role; 80 episodes |
| 1984 | Glitter | Barbara Nelson | Episode: "Pilot" |
| 1984 | Scene of the Crime | Courtney Hollander | Episode: "Pilot" |
| 1984–1985 | Hotel | Anne Crowley/Jill Stanton | 2 episodes |
| 1984–1992 | Night Court | Christine Sullivan | Guest appearance in season 2, "Daddy for the Defense"; Series regular as of Season 3; 159 episodes |
| 1985 | The $25,000 Pyramid | Herself | 5 episodes |
| 1985–1987 | Super Password | Herself | Recurring role; 20 episodes |
| 1986 | Triplecross | Delia Langtree | Television movie |
| 1988 | Glitz | Linda Moon | Television movie |
| 1988 | Tricks of the Trade | Marla | Television movie |
| 1991 | Rockin' Through the Decades | Herself | Television special |
| 1991 | Stranger at My Door | Sharon Dancey | Television movie |
| 1992–1995 | Hearts Afire | Georgie Anne Lahti Hartman | Series regular; 54 episodes |
| 1993 | Beyond Suspicion | Joyce | Television movie |
| 1994 | Someone She Knows | Laurie Philips | Television movie |
| 1995 | VR.5 | Alexis Miller | Episode: "The Many Faces of Alex" |
| 1995 | Visitors of the Night | Judith English | Television movie |
| 1996 | Chasing the Dragon | Gwen Kessler | Television movie |
| 1996 | Dave's World | Lisa McCauley | Episode: "Falling" |
| 1997 | Dog's Best Friend | Horse | Television movie; voice role |
| 1997 | Survival on the Mountain | Amy Hoffman | Television movie |
| 1998 | I've Been Waiting for You | Rosemary Zoltanne | Television movie |
| 1999-2000 | Odd Man Out | Julia Whitney | Series regular; 13 episodes |
| 2000 | Twice in a Lifetime | Nancy Waldron/Peggy McIntrye | Episode: "It's a Hard Knock Life" |
| 2000 | Hollywood Squares | Herself | 5 episodes |
| 2001 | Till Dad Do Us Part | Virginia Corbett | Television movie |
| 2001 | Late Boomers | unknown | Television movie |
| 2002–2006 | Scrubs | Lily Reid | 3 episodes |
| 2003–2004 | The District | Audrey Livingston/Simone Fairgate/Audrey Livermore | 2 episodes |
| 2006 | Ghost Whisperer | Diana Lassiter | Episode: "The Woman of His Dreams" |
| 2007 | Holiday in Handcuffs | Katherine Chandler | Television movie |
| 2008 | 30 Rock | Herself | Episode: "The One with the Cast of Night Court" |
| 2010 | Backyard Wedding | Aunt Addie | Television movie |
| 2010–2013 | Transformers Prime | June Darby | Series regular; 15 episodes; Voice role |
| 2011 | Man Up | Linda | Episode: "Acceptance" |
| 2013 | Christmas on the Bayou | Lilly | Television movie |
| 2014–2017 | Chicago P.D. | Barbara "Bunny" Fletcher | Recurring role; 18 episodes |
| 2017 | The Joneses Unplugged | Tawney | Television movie |
| 2017 | Four Christmases and a Wedding | Anna Taylor | Television movie |
| 2018 | Santa Clarita Diet | Becky | Episode: "Coyote in Yoga Pants" |
| 2018–2019 | The Kids Are Alright | Helen Portollo | 4 episodes |
| 2019 | Soundtrack | Mrs. Kassem | Episode: "Track 2: Joanna and Nellie" |
| 2019 | Christmas Reservations | Tay Griffin | Television movie |

== Awards and nominations ==
- 1994 CableACE Award for Children's Program Special - 6 and Young (Presidential Inaugural Celebration for Children) – Won
