= Cook Off! =

- Release poster
- Directed by: Cathryn Michon; Guy Shalem
- Written by: Cathryn Michon; Wendi McLendon-Covey; W. Bruce Cameron
- Based on: The Grrl Genius Guide to Life by Cathryn Michon
- Starring: Cathryn Michon; Wendi McLendon-Covey; Melissa McCarthy; Ben Falcone; Gary Anthony Williams; Niecy Nash; Jack Plotnick; Diedrich Bader; Phil LaMarr; Jordan Black; Romy Rosemont; Roy Jenkins; Cristine Rose; Jennifer Elise Cox; Markie Post; Marcia Wallace; Gavin MacLeod; Cedric Yarbrough; Stephen Root; Louie Anderson
- Cinematography: Bruce Dickson
- Edited by: Cathryn Michon; Mallory Gottlieb; Michael Demirjian
- Music by: Joel Beckerman
- Distributed by: Lionsgate Premiere
- Release dates: February 13, 2007 (US Comedy Arts Festival); November 17, 2017 (United States)
- Running time: 98 minutes
- Country: United States
- Language: English

Cook Off! is a 2007 American mockumentary comedy film directed by Cathryn Michon and Guy Shalem. It features several now well-established actors, including Melissa McCarthy, Ben Falcone, Markie Post and both Marcia Wallace and Gavin MacLeod as themselves.

50 amateur "chefs" from around the United States compete to win a million dollar prize in the ultimate food fight.

After a limited premiere in 2007, it was shelved for 10 years. The film was released on November 17, 2017.

== Plot ==
The Minnesotan sisters Sharon and Pauline Solfest both win entry into the one million dollar, Van Rookle Farms televised cooking contest. While the first enters a multiple chocolate dessert, nursing home employee and nutritionist Pauline enters a dish easy to digest for seniors. Sharon is engaged to Lars Hagerbakke, a black Swede, and they have vowed chastity until their wedding, while her sister works so much, she has no time for a relationship.

Some of the other 48 contestants from around the country are introduced. The first ever African American participant, Ladybug Briggs, is the mother of Atlantan preacher Thaddeus and womanizer Markus. Connecticutian Cassandra Dougherty is clearly participating because her domineering mother Victoria is pushing her into it. Arizonan mother of many Patty Pasternak, enters pregnant. Daneel Kuhar, an obsessed past contestant who had participated until the limit, has her 'boyfriend' Del Crawford enter.

At the welcome event, Victoria blocks all males who try to interact with Cassandra, including Markus and Del. Daneel circulates among the contestants, none of whom remember her from past years.

On day one, while all of the other contestants have already begun preparing their dishes, Amber Strang and her husband Cameron burst in. Having had trouble en route by car from Pittsburgh, they are late so are told they are disqualified. The onlookers rally for Amber, so she is let in.

Meanwhile, as her sister Sharon clearly is oblivious that Lars is a closeted gay, a distraught Pauline looks for advice on how to make her realize. They end up arguing, with Pauline pointing out that her sister puts her down regularly. When Cassandra's dish gets burned, in part due to her mother not leaving her alone, she finally rebels, calling her a controlling has-been.

Both Amber and Cassandra are disqualified. The first is upset, as she tripped on the way to placing her dish in front of the others, the other feels liberated, as she stood up to her mother, who claims she needs psychiactric help.

That evening the contestants unwind in an evening social event. Both TV presenter Christine Merriweather and Sharon suspect Daneel and Del of something fishy. Shortly after Sharon suggests to Lars they consummate their relationship, he goes off with Del to the bar Bananas, where he believes he will enjoy himself. The camera crew secretly follows, Lars realizes and comes out.

Arriving back at the hotel room in the morning, Sharon chews Lars out. He clearly announces he is gay, but she is in denial. Sharon mentions conversion therapy to unconfuse Lars. He insists he will always be there for her, but asks her to return her pink engagement ring.

The final, 'The Ring of Fire' consists of both Solfest sisters, Lady Briggs, Del, Patty and two more. Sharon breaks down in tears so both Pauline and Lady Briggs encourage her. Del has a hostile call from Daneel and notices Patty's water has broken. Just after the judges choose Del's dish, not only does Daneel happily jump in, ecstatically declaring she has won, but the footage taken in Bananas is shown. Del confided to Lars his collaboration with Daneel.

Chaos ensues, as Del runs out with the check. The studio gets locked down, so Patty's husband sneaks in with the Muffin Man's costume. Paramedics soon follow. Reevaluating the entries, Pauline is declared the victor.

Six months later, a news report references Cookoffgate, as both Daneel Kuhar and Del Crawford have been imprisoned. Her conviction is for fraudulently entering the contest via him with her recipe, as she had already participated in the contest three other times.

== Cast ==
- Cathryn Michon as Sharon Solfest
- Melissa McCarthy as Amber Strang
- Wendi McLendon-Covey as Pauline Solfest
- Ben Falcone as Cameron Strang
- Gary Anthony Williams as Lars Hagerbakke
- Stephen Root as Morty Van Rookle
- Diedrich Bader as Del Crawford
- Niecy Nash as Ladybug Briggs
- Louie Anderson as Mayor Doug Halverson
- Marcia Wallace as Herself
- Gavin MacLeod as Himself
- Markie Post as Christine Merriweather
- Jordan Black as Markus Briggs
- Steve Little as Muffin Man
- Sam Pancake as David Lord
- Paul Willson as Mike Sweazy
- Jack Plotnick as Timothy Whims
- Cristine Rose as Victoria Dougherty
- Phil LaMarr as Reverend Thaddeus Briggs, Esq.
- Jennifer Elise Cox as Cassandra Dougherty
- Cedric Yarbrough as Jericho
- Romy Rosemont as Patty Pasternak
- Roy Jenkins as Richard Pasternak
- Jim Rash as Beauregard St. Pompadeux
- Karen Maruyama as Lee Nguyen
- S.A. Griffin as Dave Carriere
- Melissa Peterman as Nancy Shmaedeke
- Mindy Sterling as Mrs. Burris
- Mo Collins as Van Rookle Farms Housewife
- Annie Mumolo as Moonlight Girl
- Tara Subkoff as Mayor's Assistant
- W. Bruce Cameron as EMT

== Production ==
The film was already finished by 2007, but was shelved without explanation for a decade. In September 2017, Lionsgate Premiere reportedly was to finally release the film. Lionsgate had reportedly edited the film prior to release by cutting 20 minutes of footage and adding 22 minutes of previously unused footage.

== Release ==
The film made its worldwide premiere at the US Comedy Arts Festival in Aspen, Colorado, in February 2007. The film was released in theaters and on VOD on November 17, 2017.

== Reception ==
On review aggregation website Rotten Tomatoes, the film has an average rating of 25% based on eight reviews, with an average rating of 6.20/10.

John DeFore of The Hollywood Reporter writes, "Cook Off! piles some better-than-this comedians into a culinary competition whose dishes look as unpalatable as the film itself." Ben Kenigsberg of The New York Times writes: "The movie tries to do for amateur cooking contests what Best in Show did for dog competitions, but the strained folksiness and tired stereotypes couldn't be further from the snap and wit of prime Christopher Guest. Michael Rechtshaffen of the Los Angeles Times writes, "Wafting into theaters after sitting on the back burner for the last decade, Cook Off! is a shrill, gloppy mess of a mockumentary being served up well past its "best before" date — if there ever actually were one."
