= List of 2021 box office number-one films in Ecuador =

This is a list of films which placed number-one at the weekend box office in Ecuador during 2021.

== Number-one films ==
#	Weekend end date	Film	Box office	Openings in the top ten	Ref.
1	January 3, 2021	Abominable	$1,517		
2	January 10, 2021	No box office data for the weekend of January 10 2021.			
3	January 17, 2021	Dolittle	$75		
4	January 24, 2021	Dolittle	$74		
5	January 31, 2021	Dolittle	$112		
6	February 7, 2021	Abominable	$218		
7	February 14, 2021	No box office data for the weekend of February 14 2021.			
8	February 21, 2021	No box office data for the weekend of February 21 2021.			
9	February 28, 2021	No box office data for the weekend of February 28 2021.			
10	March 7, 2021	No box office data for the weekend of March 7 2021.			
11	March 14, 2021	No box office data for the weekend of March 14 2021.			
12	March 21, 2021	No box office data for the weekend of March 21 2021.			
13	March 28, 2021	No box office data for the weekend of March 28 2021.			
14	April 4, 2021	No box office data for the weekend of April 4 2021.			
15	April 11, 2021	No box office data for the weekend of April 11 2021.			
16	April 18, 2021	No box office data for the weekend of April 18 2021.			
17	April 25, 2021	No box office data for the weekend of April 25 2021.			
18	May 2, 2021	No box office data for the weekend of May 2 2021.			
19	May 9, 2021	No box office data for the weekend of May 9 2021.			
20	May 16, 2021	No box office data for the weekend of May 16 2021.			
21	May 23, 2021	No box office data for the weekend of May 23 2021.			
22	May 30, 2021	No box office data for the weekend of May 30 2021.			
23	June 6, 2021	No box office data for the weekend of June 6 2021.			
24	June 13, 2021	No box office data for the weekend of June 13 2021.			
25	June 20, 2021	Spiral	$1,855		
26	June 27, 2021	F9: The Fast Saga	$769,000		
27	July 4, 2021	No box office data for the weekend of July 4 2021.			
28	July 11, 2021	No box office data for the weekend of July 11 2021.			
29	July 18, 2021	The Forever Purge	$45,000		
30	July 25, 2021	No box office data for the weekend of July 25 2021.			
31	August 1, 2021	No box office data for the weekend of August 1 2021.			
32	August 8, 2021	Hitman's Wife's Bodyguard	$692		
33	August 15, 2021	Paw Patrol: The Movie	$55,000		
34	August 22, 2021	Spirit Untamed	$21,000		
35	August 29, 2021	No box office data for the weekend of August 29 2021.			
36	September 5, 2021	No box office data for the weekend of September 5 2021.			
37	September 12, 2021	No box office data for the weekend of September 12 2021.			
38	September 19, 2021	No box office data for the weekend of September 19 2021.			
39	September 26, 2021	No box office data for the weekend of September 26 2021.			
40	October 3, 2021	No Time to Die	$211,000		
41	October 10, 2021	No box office data for the weekend of October 10 2021.			
42	October 17, 2021	No box office data for the weekend of October 17 2021.			
43	October 24, 2021	No box office data for the weekend of October 24 2021.			
44	October 31, 2021	No box office data for the weekend of October 31 2021.			
45	November 7, 2021	No box office data for the weekend of November 7 2021.			
46	November 14, 2021	No box office data for the weekend of November 14 2021.			
47	November 21, 2021	No box office data for the weekend of November 21 2021.			
48	November 28, 2021	No box office data for the weekend of November 28 2021.			
49	December 5, 2021	No box office data for the weekend of December 5 2021.			
50	December 12, 2021	No box office data for the weekend of December 12 2021.			
51	December 19, 2021	Spider-Man: No Way Home	$3,700,000		
52	December 26, 2021	No box office data for the weekend of December 26 2021.			

== See also ==
- 2021 in Ecuador

Preceded by 2020 Box office number-one films	Box office number-one films 2021	Succeeded by 2022 Box office number-one films
