= A Dog's Way Home (novel) =

2017 novel by W. Bruce Cameron

- First edition cover
- Author: W. Bruce Cameron
- Language: English
- Series: A Dog’s Way Home
- Publisher: Macmillan Publishers
- Publication date: May 9, 2017
- Publication place: United States
- Media type: Print (hardcover and paperback)
- Pages: 336
- ISBN: 978-0-765-37465-3
- Followed by: A Dog's Courage

A Dog's Way Home is a 2017 novel by American author W. Bruce Cameron. It received a mostly positive reception and was adapted into a movie of the same name. It is followed by the 2021 novel A Dog's Courage.

== Synopsis ==
Bella, a puppy, lived under an old shack with her adoptive cat family in Denver, Colorado. Lucas, a young man, and Olivia, a young woman, adopt her. When Bella becomes separated from Lucas and Olivia after she was impounded by the animal control due to Denver's pitbull ban, she finds herself on a 400-mile journey to reunite with her owner. The dog meets an orphaned mountain lion who she names Big Kitten, a veteran, and some friendly strangers who happen to cross her path. When she finds Lucas, she finds that Lucas was waiting for her. The animal control officer tries to take her, but ends up failing.

== Reception ==
The novel had a mostly positive reception because it shared a powerful message on how breed discrimination against dogs, especially the pitbulls, affected the dogs' lives and their owners' lives. This novel also taught readers that pitbulls are definitely not "dangerous" dogs, convinced the readers to stand up to the discriminating BSL (Breed Specific Law), and demand that city governments, especially in Denver, repeal this unfair law. The book was not without its critics, like PETA, who criticized the book for oversimplifying the breed-specific legislation issue and the perceived danger of pitbulls.

== Adaptation ==
In 2019, the novel was adapted into a flim of the same name.

== Sequel(s) ==
On May 4, 2021, A Dog's Courage was published and is currently the only official sequel. It likewise has 336 pages, and was published by the same publisher. In this book, Bella now lives happily after reuniting with her masters, Lucas and Oliva. While they were going on a camping trip, a wildfire happens. Bella gets separated from her masters. In the wilderness again, Bella takes care of 2 orphaned cougar cubs.
