= List of 2016 box office number-one films in Ecuador =

This is a list of films which placed number-one at the weekend box office in Ecuador during 2016.

== Number-one films ==
#	Weekend end date	Film	Box office	Openings in the top ten	Ref.
1	January 3, 2016	The Peanuts Movie	$197,766	By the Sea #8, Burying the Ex #9	
2	January 10, 2016	Alvin and the Chipmunks: The Road Chip	$227,024	Pay the Ghost #5, Sisters #6, American Ultra #10	
3	January 17, 2016	No box office data for the weekend of 17 January 2016.			
4	January 24, 2016	The 5th Wave	$293,878	The Big Short #5, Room #6	
5	January 31, 2016	The 5th Wave	$242,818	Ride Along 2 #3	
6	February 7, 2016	The 5th Wave	$116,751		
7	February 14, 2016	The Finest Hours	$135,378	Zoolander 2 #3, Concussion #5, The Danish Girl #8, The Choice #10	
8	February 21, 2016	Deadpool	$593,643	How to Be Single #2	
9	February 28, 2016	Deadpool	$253,562		
10	March 6, 2016	Spotlight	$8,335		
11	March 13, 2016	Zootopia	$296,525	The Divergent Series: Allegiant #2, The Other Side of the Door #5, Risen #9	
12	March 20, 2016	Zootopia	$159,032	13 Hours #5	
13	March 27, 2016	Batman v Superman: Dawn of Justice	$1,300,664	Solace #6	
14	April 3, 2016	Batman v Superman: Dawn of Justice	$714,538	Norm of the North #3, My Big Fat Greek Wedding 2 #5, Eddie the Eagle #6	
15	April 10, 2016	The Jungle Book	$678,434	Dirty Grandpa #4, Robot Overlords #9	
16	April 17, 2016	The Jungle Book	$322,680	London Has Fallen #3, 10 Cloverfield Lane #4	
17	April 24, 2016	No box office data for the weekend of 24 April 2016.			
18	May 1, 2016	No box office data for the weekend of 1 May 2016.			
19	May 8, 2016	No box office data for the weekend of 8 May 2016.			
20	May 15, 2016	No box office data for the weekend of 15 May 2016.			
21	May 22, 2016	No box office data for the weekend of 22 May 2016.			
22	May 29, 2016	No box office data for the weekend of 29 May 2016.			
23	June 5, 2016	No box office data for the weekend of 5 June 2016.			
24	June 12, 2016	Warcraft	$198,921		
25	June 19, 2016	No box office data for the weekend of 19 June 2016.			
26	June 26, 2016	Independence Day: Resurgence	$352,618		
27	July 3, 2016	Independence Day: Resurgence	$303,091		
28	July 10, 2016	Ice Age: Collision Course	$803,180		
29	July 17, 2016	Ice Age: Collision Course	$528,771		
30	July 24, 2016	The Secret Life of Pets	$434,007		
31	July 31, 2016	The Secret Life of Pets	$239,000		
32	August 7, 2016	The Secret Life of Pets	$179,429		
33	August 14, 2016	The Secret Life of Pets	$99,000		
34	August 21, 2016	The Shallows	$67,733		
35	August 28, 2016	The Shallows	$51,728		
36	September 4, 2016	Kubo and the Two Strings	$61,514		
37	September 11, 2016	Don't Breathe	$109,417		
38	September 18, 2016	Don't Breathe	$89,473		
39	September 25, 2016	The Magnificent Seven	$54,406		
40	October 2, 2016	Deepwater Horizon	$80,378		
41	October 9, 2016	Deepwater Horizon	$40,000		
42	October 16, 2016	Inferno	$184,748		
43	October 23, 2016	Inferno	$135,143		
44	October 30, 2016	Ouija: Origin of Evil	$115,389		
45	November 6, 2016	Trolls	$207,468		
46	November 13, 2016	The Girl on the Train	$56,821		
47	November 20, 2016	The Girl on the Train	$40,160		
48	November 27, 2016	Arrival	$43,418		
49	December 4, 2016	Underworld: Blood Wars	$164,833		
50	December 11, 2016	Underworld: Blood Wars	$43,073		
51	December 18, 2016	No box office data for the weekend of 18 December 2016.			
52	December 25, 2016	No box office data for the weekend of 25 December 2016.			
53	January 1, 2017	Sing	$134,235		

== See also ==
- 2016 in Ecuador

Preceded by 2015 Box office number-one films	Box office number-one films 2016	Succeeded by 2017 Box office number-one films
