= Peter Baykov =

Bulgarian actor

- Петър Байков
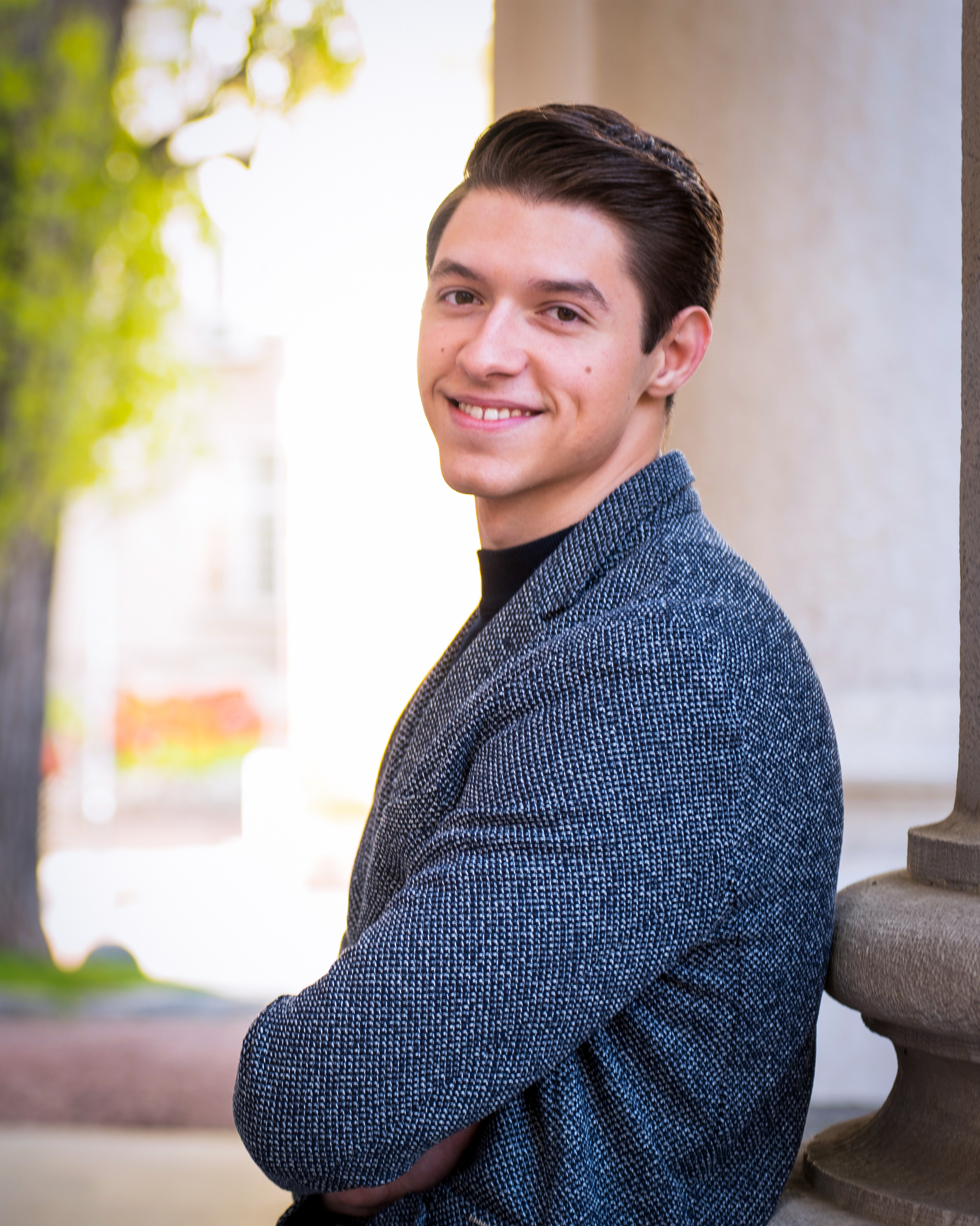
- Born: 21 March 1998 (age 28); Sofia, Bulgaria
- Education: New Bulgarian University (BA)
- Occupations: Actor; Singer; Director; Producer
- Years active: 2017–present
- Website: peterbaykov.com

Peter Baykov (Bulgarian: Петър Байков; born 21 March 1998) is a Bulgarian-born film and theater actor, known for dubbing movies, series and commercials in Bulgarian, English, French and Russian. He is able to recreate live over 40 different male and female voices, as seen on the Got Talent Show in Bulgaria.

== Early life and education ==
Baykov was born in Sofia, Bulgaria. From a young age, he has always been fluent in English and Bulgarian, being born in a multi-lingual family.

He studied bachelor of Film and TV Production in London, United Kingdom after graduating from the National Trade and Banking High School in Sofia.

In 2017 he attended the New Bulgarian University to finish his studies and graduate with a bachelor's degree in Acting for Film and Theatre.

During his studies in 2018, he did the dubbing for every character in Beauty and the Beast and Maleficent by changing his voice from male to female live in special screenings held at New Bulgarian University.

On June 17, 2021, Peter Baykov did the dubbing for all the 45 roles in the Disney musical Mary Poppins Returns. He also performed all the songs from the movie in Bulgarian by naturally changing his voice as part of his Acting BA diploma work at New Bulgarian University.

=== Acting career ===
Baykov began his acting career at an early age with the dubbing of movies and television series. In 2019 he made his television debut in the Got Talent Show in Bulgaria where he reached the finals. The same year, he got cast in several main roles in movies for Walt Disney Studios for their international release, one of which was Prince Philip in Maleficent: Mistress of Evil at Shepperton Studios.

=== Music career ===
In 2020 he made his musical singing debut in the album "Veliko 2020" by Elitsa Todorova with their duet song - "Rosinka".

== Filmography ==
=== Film ===
Year	Title	Role	Notes
2022	The Traveler: With the Voice of Peter Baykov	All characters	Bulgarian
2019	Maleficent: Mistress of Evil	Prince Phillip	Bulgarian
2019	The Secret Life of Pets 2	Superhero	Bulgarian
2019	A Dog's Journey	Trent	Bulgarian
2019	Playmobil: The Movie	Charlie	Bulgarian
2019	Trouble	Tippy	Bulgarian

=== Television ===
Year	Title	Role	Notes
2019	Bulgaria's Got Talent	Self	3 episodes (auditions, semi-finals, finals)
