= List of 2020 box office number-one films in Ecuador =

This is a list of films which placed number-one at the weekend box office in Ecuador during 2020.

== Number-one films ==
#	Weekend end date	Film	Box office	Openings in the top ten	Ref.
1	January 5, 2020	Jumanji: The Next Level	$408,367	Cats #3	
2	January 12, 2020	Jumanji: The Next Level	$253,672	Charlie's Angels #2	
3	January 19, 2020	Dolittle	$281,700		
4	January 26, 2020	Bad Boys for Life	$237,701	Bombshell #4	
5	February 2, 2020	Bad Boys for Life	$147,260	1917 #3, Little Women #5	
6	February 9, 2020	Dolittle	$67,272		
7	February 16, 2020	The Grudge	$104,356		
8	February 23, 2020	No box office data for the weekend of 23 February 2020.			
9	March 1, 2020	No box office data for the weekend of 1 March 2020.			
10	March 8, 2020	The Invisible Man	$60,592		
11	March 15, 2020	No box office data for the weekend of March 15 2020.			
12	March 22, 2020	No box office data for the weekend of March 22 2020.			
13	March 29, 2020	No box office data for the weekend of March 29 2020.			
14	April 5, 2020	No box office data for the weekend of April 5 2020.			
15	April 12, 2020	No box office data for the weekend of April 12 2020.			
16	April 19, 2020	No box office data for the weekend of April 19 2020.			
17	April 26, 2020	No box office data for the weekend of April 26 2020.			
18	May 3, 2020	No box office data for the weekend of May 3 2020.			
19	May 10, 2020	No box office data for the weekend of May 10 2020.			
20	May 17, 2020	No box office data for the weekend of May 17 2020.			
21	May 24, 2020	No box office data for the weekend of May 24 2020.			
22	May 31, 2020	No box office data for the weekend of May 31 2020.			
23	June 7, 2020	No box office data for the weekend of June 7 2020.			
24	June 14, 2020	No box office data for the weekend of June 14 2020.			
25	June 21, 2020	No box office data for the weekend of June 21 2020.			
26	June 28, 2020	No box office data for the weekend of June 28 2020.			
27	July 5, 2020	No box office data for the weekend of July 5 2020.			
28	July 12, 2020	The Invisible Man	$1,652		
29	July 19, 2020	The Invisible Man	$1,120		
30	July 26, 2020	The Invisible Man	$1,123		
31	August 2, 2020	The Invisible Man	$395		
32	August 9, 2020	No box office data for the weekend of August 9 2020.			
33	August 16, 2020	No box office data for the weekend of August 16 2020.			
34	August 23, 2020	No box office data for the weekend of August 23 2020.			
35	August 30, 2020	The Turning	$40		
36	September 6, 2020	The Turning	$54		
37	September 13, 2020	The Invisible Man	$112		
38	September 20, 2020	Dolittle	$204		
39	September 27, 2020	Dolittle	$317		
40	October 4, 2020	Trolls World Tour	$47,570		
41	October 11, 2020	I Still Believe	$20,678		
42	October 18, 2020	No box office data for the weekend of October 18 2020.			
43	October 25, 2020	No box office data for the weekend of October 25 2020.			
44	November 1, 2020	No box office data for the weekend of November 1 2020.			
45	November 8, 2020	No box office data for the weekend of November 8 2020.			
46	November 15, 2020	No box office data for the weekend of November 15 2020.			
47	November 22, 2020	No box office data for the weekend of November 22 2020.			
48	November 29, 2020	Be Natural: The Untold Story of Alice Guy-Blaché	$10		
49	December 6, 2020	Trolls World Tour	$866		
50	December 13, 2020	No box office data for the weekend of December 13 2020.			
51	December 20, 2020	No box office data for the weekend of December 20 2020.			
52	December 27, 2020	No box office data for the weekend of December 27 2020.			

== See also ==
- 2020 in Ecuador

Preceded by 2019 Box office number-one films	Box office number-one films 2020	Succeeded by 2021 Box office number-one films
