= Hearts Afire =

American television sitcom (1992–1995)

- Genre: Sitcom
- Created by: Linda Bloodworth-Thomason
- Starring: John Ritter; Markie Post; Billy Bob Thornton; Beth Broderick; Wendie Jo Sperber; Clark Duke; Leslie Jordan; Conchata Ferrell
- Composer: Bruce Miller
- Country of origin: United States
- Original language: English
- No. of seasons: 3
- No. of episodes: 54 (1 unaired)

Production
- Camera setup: Multi-camera
- Running time: 30 minutes
- Production companies: Bloodworth-Thomason; Mozark Productions; Adam Productions

Original release
- Network: CBS
- Release: September 14, 1992 – February 1, 1995

Hearts Afire is an American television sitcom created by Linda Bloodworth-Thomason, starring John Ritter and Markie Post, that aired on CBS from September 14, 1992, to February 1, 1995. The series' title is taken from a line in the Earth, Wind & Fire song "That's the Way of the World" (which originally served as the series' theme song).

== Series premise ==
Described by CBS as a "politically topical series" and created by Linda Bloodworth-Thomason and Harry Thomason, the show starred John Ritter and Markie Post playing John Hartman and Georgie Anne Lahti, respectively. Supporting actors included Billy Bob Thornton and Ed Asner. The show was set in Washington, D.C., and centered on a conservative senator's aide (Ritter) and a liberal political reporter (Post) whose professional disagreements masked a growing attraction for one another. Other costars on the show included George Gaynes, Beth Broderick, and Wendie Jo Sperber. The series was itself a satire on current affairs in Washington, D.C.

John and Georgie Anne married near the end of the first season. In the second season, the show abruptly changed its setting to the Southern town where John grew up; he returned to take over the town's failing newspaper, accompanied by Georgie Anne and his two children from a previous marriage. Some of the supporting characters made the move as well, while others were superseded.

== Cast ==
- John Ritter as John Hartman
- Markie Post as Georgie Anne Lahti
- Billy Bob Thornton) as Billy Bob Davis

=== Cameos ===
- Roger Clinton, half-brother of Bill Clinton, appeared in a cameo as a restaurant singer at the end of the series' third episode
- Hugh E. Rodham, father of the incoming First Lady of the United States, Hillary Rodham Clinton, made a cameo appearance in December 1992
- Political pundit Rush Limbaugh guest-starred as himself on an April 1994 episode
- Harry Anderson, Post's co-star on Night Court and Ritter's co-star from It made a cameo appearance in a March 1994 episode, portraying columnist Dave Barry as part of a crossover with Anderson's contemporary series, Dave's World

== Episodes ==
=== Series overview ===
Season	Episodes	Originally released		Rank	Rating
Season	Episodes	First released	Last released	Rank	Rating
1	23	September 14, 1992	March 22, 1993	20	14.3
2	17	October 27, 1993	April 25, 1994	63	9.7 (Tied with Moon over Miami)
3	14	September 24, 1994	February 1, 1995	89	8.2 (Tied with Homicide: Life on the Street and Sliders)

=== Season 1 (1992–93) ===
No. overall	No. in season	Title	Directed by	Written by	Original release date	Viewers (millions)
1	1	"Bees Can Sting You, Watch Out: Parts 1 & 2"	Harry Thomason	Linda Bloodworth-Thomason	September 14, 1992	21.1
2	2	"Bees Can Sting You, Watch Out: Parts 1 & 2"	Harry Thomason	Linda Bloodworth-Thomason	September 14, 1992	21.1
Characters are introduced as John and Georgie are tasked with dealing with the senator on day to day business; John's kids Elliot (Clark Duke) and Ben (Justin Burnette) become a bee wrangler and a bathroom valet respectively; Billy Bob (Billy Bob Thornton) is kicked out of the house by Mavis (Wendie Jo Sperber); and Georgie's guardian Miss Lula (Beah Richards) moves with her into John's home. They then hold a party to celebrate Dee Dee's (Beth Broderick) birthday, only for everything to go wrong.
3	3	"The Big Date"	Harry Thomason	Linda Bloodworth-Thomason	September 21, 1992	26.9
John and Georgie go on a group date and end up meeting George Hamilton.
4	4	"Three Men and a Bed"	Harry Thomason	Linda Bloodworth-Thomason	September 28, 1992	24.5
John is sick, so to make him feel better, Billy Bob and the senator visit to try and make him feel better; John ultimately gets quarantined.
5	5	"John's Stallion"	Harry Thomason	Linda Bloodworth-Thomason	October 5, 1992	23.6
Georgie's father, George (Ed Asner), visits after getting out of jail, and she wants him to stay over at John's house. The two then start doing things that start to annoy John, as he wonders about how Georgie's dad got out so early. The senator complains about a new implant that he has, and wants to get it removed.
6	6	"First Time"	Harry Thomason	Linda Bloodworth-Thomason	October 12, 1992	22.0
John's boys are going camping with Billy Bob and Georgie's father, leaving the two at home. Elliot's pet snake is accidentally let loose, so they spend the rest of their night at a hotel in some couples' honeymoon suite. They meet and have to settle their arguments with the newlyweds.
7	7	"Significant Others"	Harry Thomason	Linda Bloodworth-Thomason	October 26, 1992	21.8
The senator and his wife get into an argument, but neither refuses to leave; Georgie takes down another kid's mother after she beat up John; and John meets his ex-wife (Julie Cobb)'s lover (Conchata Ferrell).
8	8	"Everybody Loves My Baby"	Harry Thomason	Linda Bloodworth-Thomason	November 9, 1992	21.0
The men have to throw a charity show while being dressed as the Marvelettes.
9	9	"Conversations with My Shrink"	Harry Thomason	Linda Bloodworth-Thomason	November 16, 1992	20.0
Georgie goes out to find a new job, but can't since she believes that they discriminated against her because she's a woman; John is not sure why Georgie is telling Dr. Ruth about her problems; and Georgie goes on a date with her former boyfriend.
10	10	"The Fundamental Things Apply"	Harry Thomason	Linda Bloodworth-Thomason	November 23, 1992	20.0
The senator's wife wants to be the senator; Georgie and Mavis take Dee Dee to dinner to find out the fact that she gets aroused by patriotism; the group find out that she is going to stop seeing the senator. John visits the senator's wife Mary Fran (Mary Ann Mobley), when she confesses that she loves him.
11	11	"Smithersgate"	Harry Thomason	Ty King	November 30, 1992	20.5
Elliot starts reciting stories about John that aren't true, especially one about a shark; Billy Bob convinces John that Georgie is sharing secrets with a reporter, so he makes up a false story about the senator killing someone.
12	12	"Everyday's a Holiday"	Harry Thomason	Allen Crowe	December 14, 1992	19.7
Diandra and Dr. Ruth take John's kids on a tour, leaving John in a depressive mood. He hatches a plan to take the kids and his coworkers to New York City to make Diandra jealous. The RV they're in gets stuck, and the group surprise John with Christmas cheer. John finds someone to tow the RV to New York, and as everyone else is sleeping, the two romance about what Georgie wanted for Christmas, which was to have a family. The episode ends with childhood snapshots of the adult characters being shown, and the RV being towed.
13	13	"While the Thomasons Slept"	Harry Thomason	Don Rhymer & David Nichols	December 21, 1992	17.1
John and his kids take a trip to the White House; the governor has to prepare for a senate meeting on obscene lyrics in music; Billy Bob embarrasses himself in front of Hugh Rodham; John's kids steal the president's phonebook because they wanted souvenirs, so they convince the governor to return it.
14	14	"Trivial Pursuit"	Harry Thomason	Linda Bloodworth-Thomason	January 4, 1993	21.7
15	15	"Never Play Touch Football with the Kennedys"	Harry Thomason	Martin Rips & Joseph Staretski	January 11, 1993	20.6
16	16	"Miss Starr Dates Georgie Anne's Pop"	James Hampton	Linda Bloodworth-Thomason	January 18, 1993	22.0
17	17	"While the Thomasons Slept in the Lincoln Bedroom"	Harry Thomason	Lisa Loomer & Ty King	February 1, 1993	21.2
18	18	"Her Year with Fidel"	Harry Thomason	Linda Bloodworth-Thomason	February 8, 1993	19.8
19	19	"Cold Feet: Parts 1 & 2"	Harry Thomason	Linda Bloodworth-Thomason & Ty King & Lisa Loomer	February 22, 1993	18.6
20	20	"Cold Feet: Parts 1 & 2"	Harry Thomason	Linda Bloodworth-Thomason & Ty King & Lisa Loomer	February 22, 1993	18.6
21	21	"Take My Senate Seat, Please"	Charles Frank	Ty King & Lisa Loomer	March 1, 1993	20.4
22	22	"Flamingo Summer"	Harry Thomason	Linda Bloodworth-Thomason	March 15, 1993	21.8
23	23	"Class Reunion"	Harry Thomason	Linda Bloodworth-Thomason	March 22, 1993	22.4

=== Season 2 (1993–94) ===
No. overall	No. in season	Title	Directed by	Written by	Original release date	Viewers (millions)
24	1	"Lovely Always: Parts 1 & 2"	Harry Thomason	Linda Bloodworth-Thomason	October 27, 1993	11.2
25	2	"Lovely Always: Parts 1 & 2"	Harry Thomason	Linda Bloodworth-Thomason	October 27, 1993	11.2
26	3	"Moonlighting"	Harry Thomason	Linda Bloodworth-Thomason	November 3, 1993	12.9
27	4	"The Great Depression"	Harry Thomason	Linda Bloodworth-Thomason	November 10, 1993	8.2
28	5	"First Edition"	Harry Thomason	Linda Bloodworth-Thomason	November 17, 1993	10.7
29	6	"String of Pearls"	Harry Thomason	Linda Bloodworth-Thomason	November 24, 1993	10.3
30	7	"The Stud Club"	Harry Thomason	Story by : Don Rhymer; Teleplay by : David Nicholas & Rebecca Parr Cioffi	December 8, 1993	11.0
31	8	"Blue Christmas"	Harry Thomason	Linda Bloodworth-Thomason	December 15, 1993	10.3
32	9	"True Confessions"	Harry Thomason	Linda Bloodworth-Thomason & David Nichols	December 29, 1993	13.5
33	10	"Accelerated Dating"	Harry Thomason	Don Rhymer & Lisa Loomer	January 12, 1994	13.7
34	11	"Sweet Revenge"	Harry Thomason	Linda Bloodworth-Thomason	January 19, 1994	15.9
35	12	"The Sons of Sissy-Whatsis"	Steve Gerbson	David Nichols	February 2, 1994	12.7
36	13	"Fatal Traction"	Harry Thomason	Story by : Lisa Loomer; Teleplay by : Don Rhymer & Rebecca Parr Cioffi	February 9, 1994	14.6
37	14	"Sleepless in a Small Town"	Harry Thomason	Linda Bloodworth-Thomason	March 28, 1994	20.9
Lonnie is convinced by Georgie and Madeline to record conversations held at a secret men's only club, only to get caught. Features a brief uncredited appearance by Post's former co-star Harry Anderson from Night Court.
38	15	"Do the Limbaugh"	Harry Thomason	Linda Bloodworth-Thomason	April 11, 1994	22.3
39	16	"Love in the Afternoon"	Harry Thomason	Linda Bloodworth-Thomason	April 18, 1994	15.6
40	17	"The Big Yes"	Harry Thomason	David Nichols	April 25, 1994	15.8

=== Season 3 (1994–95) ===
No. overall	No. in season	Title	Directed by	Written by	Original release date	Viewers (millions)
41	1	"Don't Say Nothin' Bad About My Baby"	Harry Thomason	Linda Bloodworth-Thomason	September 24, 1994	13.1
42	2	"The Virgin Lonnie"	Harry Thomason	Leslie Ray & David Steven Simon	October 1, 1994	13.4
43	3	"It's My Party"	Harry Thomason	Story by : Leslie Ray & David Steven Simon; Teleplay by : Howard Nemetz & Bryan Winter	October 8, 1994	12.3
44	4	"The Sock-Her Boys"	James Hampton	Linda Bloodworth-Thomason	October 15, 1994	13.0
45	5	"Birth of a Donation"	Harry Thomason	Rebecca Parr Cioffi	October 22, 1994	12.5
46	6	"Fat Like Me"	James Hampton	Linda Bloodworth-Thomason	October 29, 1994	11.9
47	7	"Born to Dance"	James Hampton	Paul Clay	November 26, 1994	12.1
48	8	"Pros and Condoms"	Dennis Redfield	Dara Monahan & Harry Thomason	December 3, 1994	10.6
49	9	"The Perfect Christmas"	Dennis Redfield	Michael A. Ross & Thom Bray	December 10, 1994	13.7
50	10	"Help Wanted"	James Hampton	Craig Hoffman	January 11, 1995	10.8
51	11	"Mrs. Hartman, Mrs. Hartman"	James Hampton	Pamela Norris & Paul Clay	January 18, 1995	10.6
52	12	"Group Therapy"	Steve Gerbson	Dara Monahan	January 25, 1995	9.8
53	13	"John and Georgie's Not So Excellent Adventure"	Harry Thomason	Rebecca Parr Cioffi	February 1, 1995	10.2
54	14	"The Outsider"	Harry Thomason	Leslie Ray & David Steven Simon	Unaired	N/A

== Home media ==
Image Entertainment released the entire series on DVD in Region 1 in 2005 and 2006.

On November 7, 2012, it was announced that Mill Creek Entertainment had acquired the rights to the series and released Hearts Afire - The Complete Series on DVD on January 8, 2013. The 7-disc set features all 54 episodes of the series, as well as bonus features.

DVD set	Episodes	Release date
The Complete First Season	23	August 2, 2005
The Complete Second Season	17	November 1, 2005
The Complete Third Season	14	February 7, 2006
The Complete Series	54	January 8, 2013
