= List of 2018 box office number-one films in Ecuador =

This is a list of films which placed number-one at the weekend box office in Ecuador during 2018.

== Number-one films ==
#	Weekend end date	Film	Box office	Openings in the top ten	Ref.
1	January 7, 2018	Jumanji: Welcome to the Jungle	$276,292		
2	January 14, 2018	Jumanji: Welcome to the Jungle	$205,049		
3	January 21, 2018	Insidious: The Last Key	$348,299		
4	January 28, 2018	Insidious: The Last Key	$193,487		
5	February 4, 2018	Insidious: The Last Key	$150,474		
6	February 11, 2018	Fifty Shades Freed	$249,299		
7	February 18, 2018	Jumanji: Welcome to the Jungle	$49,931		
8	February 25, 2018	Fifty Shades Freed	$86,290		
9	March 4, 2018	Fifty Shades Freed	$31,574		
10	March 11, 2018	Fifty Shades Freed	$10,554		
11	March 18, 2018	Peter Rabbit	$146,140		
12	March 25, 2018	Pacific Rim: Uprising	$281,152		
13	April 1, 2018	Pacific Rim: Uprising	$178,844		
14	April 8, 2018	Blockers	$70,040		
15	April 15, 2018	Blockers	$39,354		
16	April 22, 2018	Truth or Dare	$64,752		
17	April 29, 2018	Truth or Dare	$14,471		
18	May 6, 2018	Truth or Dare	$9,084		
19	May 13, 2018	Overboard	$326,787		
20	May 20, 2018	Based on a True Story	$1,544		
21	May 27, 2018	Based on a True Story	$599		
22	June 3, 2018	Overboard	$153,889		
23	June 10, 2018	Overboard	$216,300		
24	June 17, 2018	Midnight Sun	$13,966		
25	June 24, 2018	Jurassic World: Fallen Kingdom	$811,553		
26	July 1, 2018	Jurassic World: Fallen Kingdom	$594,706		
27	July 8, 2018	No box office data for the weekend of 8 July 2018.			
28	July 15, 2018	Hotel Transylvania 3: Summer Vacation	$686,010		
29	July 22, 2018	Hotel Transylvania 3: Summer Vacation	$429,375		
30	July 29, 2018	Hotel Transylvania 3: Summer Vacation	$322,825		
31	August 5, 2018	Hotel Transylvania 3: Summer Vacation	$271,235		
32	August 12, 2018	Hotel Transylvania 3: Summer Vacation	$151,063		
33	August 19, 2018	The Equalizer 2	$120,562		
34	August 26, 2018	Slender Man	$109,117		
35	September 2, 2018	Slender Man	$93,438		
36	September 9, 2018	The Spy Who Dumped Me	$22,171		
37	September 16, 2018	BlacKkKlansman	$18,944		
38	September 23, 2018	The House with a Clock in Its Walls	$123,830		
39	September 30, 2018	The House with a Clock in Its Walls	$83,414		
40	October 7, 2018	Venom	$735,443		
41	October 14, 2018	Venom	$361,375		
42	October 21, 2018	Halloween	$215,020		
43	October 28, 2018	Halloween	$171,286		
44	November 4, 2018	Bohemian Rhapsody	$594,095		
45	November 11, 2018	Halloween	$36,389		
46	November 18, 2018	Night School	$40,923		
47	November 25, 2018	Hell Fest	$35,000		
48	December 2, 2018	Robin Hood	$89,377		
49	December 9, 2018	The Grinch	$533,998		
50	December 16, 2018	The Grinch	$271,530		
51	December 23, 2018	The Grinch	$157,435		
52	December 30, 2018	Spider-Man: Into the Spider-Verse	$135,853		

== See also ==
- 2018 in Ecuador

Preceded by 2017 Box office number-one films	Box office number-one films 2018	Succeeded by 2019 Box office number-one films
