= Rebecca Parr Cioffi =

American writer

Rebecca Parr
- Other names: Rebecca Parr Cioffi; Arpy Beck
- Occupations: Television writer; Novelist
- Years active: 1985–present

Rebecca Parr, later billed as Rebecca Parr Cioffi, is an American television writer, story editor and producer best known for her work on Cheers, Roseanne, Max Headroom, Simon & Simon, and Hearts Afire amongst other shows.

Parr initially worked in a writing partnership with Martin Pasko, and broke into the television industry by selling several scripts to the 1985 revival of The Twilight Zone. She and Pasko then went on to story edit the animated series My Little Pony 'n Friends, followed by work on an episode of Max Headroom. During the 1988/89 TV season, Parr and Pasko were the story editors on the final season of Simon & Simon, and wrote the series finale "Simon Says 'Good-Bye'". This was followed by a stint as writers and story editors on the show Roseanne.

Parr and Pasko dissolved their writing partnership circa 1990, Pasko working thereafter in animation and comics. Meanwhile, now billed as Rebecca Parr Cioffi, Parr continued her work in live action situation comedy, signing on as an executive story consultant for the final season of Cheers, for which she also wrote three episodes. She later served as a writer/co-producer on the sitcom Hearts Afire, and writer/supervising producer of Boston Common.

Most recently, Parr published the kindle-edition novel And She Was under the pseudonym of Arpy Beck. As of 2013 she resided in Glendale, Arizona.

== Novel ==
...And She Was (2012) (as "Arpy Beck")
