= Someone She Knows =

- Genre: Thriller, drama
- Written by: Carol Monpere
- Directed by: Eric Laneuville
- Starring: Markie Post; Gerald McRaney; Jeffrey Nordling; Spencer Garrett
- Theme music composer: Wendy Blackstone
- Country of origin: United States
- Original language: English

Production
- Executive producer: Thomas Carter
- Cinematography: Paul Elliott
- Editor: John Duffy
- Running time: 95 minutes
- Production company: Warner Bros. Television

Original release
- Network: NBC
- Release: October 3, 1994

Someone She Knows is a 1994 NBC television film directed by Eric Laneuville and starring Markie Post, Gerald McRaney, Jeffrey Nordling and Spencer Garrett as main characters. It was filmed in Valencia, Santa Clarita, California.

== Plot summary ==
Based on a true story, the film follows a young mother's search to bring her daughter's killer to justice.

Laurie Phillips (Markie Post) is distraught when her five-year-old daughter Marilee (Sarah Freeman) is discovered murdered. Increasingly frustrated by the inabilities of the local police to find the killer, Laurie turns to an old friend of the family, State Trooper Frank Mayfield (Gerald McRaney) and soon reaches the terrifying conclusion that the guilty individual may be someone she knows.

== Cast ==
- Markie Post as Laurie Philips
- Gerald McRaney as Frank Mayfield
- Jeffrey Nordling as Greg Philips
- Spencer Garrett as Lt. Harry Kramer
- Harold Sylvester as Lt. Jack Emery
- Sharon Lawrence as Sharon
- Phillip Van Dyke as Cash Gardner
- Jamie Renée Smith as Brandy Gardner
- Sarah Freeman as Marilee Philip
- Alma Beltran as Thelma Lambeth
- Jeff Doucette as Deputy Olsen
