= List of 2022 box office number-one films in Ecuador =

This is a list of films which placed number-one at the weekend box office in Ecuador during 2022.

== Number-one films ==
#	Weekend end date	Film	Box office	Openings in the top ten	Ref.
1	January 2, 2022	The 355	$15,763		
2	January 9, 2022	The 355	$4,874		
3	January 16, 2022	The 355	$2,626		
4	January 23, 2022	The 355	$734		
5	January 30, 2022	Spencer	$18,099		
6	February 6, 2022	Spencer	$12,065		
7	February 13, 2022	No box office data for the weekend of February 13 2022.			
8	February 20, 2022	Spencer	$3,606		
9	March 6, 2022	No box office data for the weekend of March 6 2022.			
10	March 13, 2022	Sing 2	$6,591	Belfast #2	
11	March 20, 2022	The Exorcism of God	$49,133		
12	March 27, 2022	The Bad Guys	$9,001	Ambulance #3	
13	April 3, 2022	Belfast	$853		
14	April 10, 2022	The Bad Guys	$26,239		
15	April 17, 2022	Ambulance	$2,026		
16	April 24, 2022	The Bad Guys	$6,939		
17	May 1, 2022	The Bad Guys	$7,096		
18	May 8, 2022	The Northman	$973		
19	May 15, 2022	The Unbearable Weight of Massive Talent	$16,211		
20	May 22, 2022	The Unbearable Weight of Massive Talent	$8,920		
21	May 29, 2022	Firestarter	$4,893		
22	June 5, 2022	Jurassic World: Dominion	$1,174,000		
23	June 12, 2022	Jurassic World: Dominion	$603,000		
24	June 19, 2022	Jurassic World: Dominion	$268,323		
25	June 26, 2022	Dog	$49,528		
26	July 3, 2022	Dog	$34,594		
27	July 10, 2022	Minions: The Rise of Gru	$36,563		
28	July 17, 2022	Minions: The Rise of Gru	$349,148		
29	July 24, 2022	Minions: The Rise of Gru	$243,796		
30	July 31, 2022	Minions: The Rise of Gru	$151,147		
31	August 7, 2022	Minions: The Rise of Gru	$108,523		
32	August 14, 2022	Minions: The Rise of Gru	$108,660		
33	August 21, 2022	Minions: The Rise of Gru	$51,831	Beast #2	
34	August 28, 2022	Nope	$44,020		
35	September 4, 2022	Nope	$26,202		
36	September 11, 2022	Ticket to Paradise	$72,000		
37	September 18, 2022	Ticket to Paradise	$44,589		
38	September 25, 2022	Ticket to Paradise	$2,066		
39	October 2, 2022	Ticket to Paradise	$15,870		
40	October 9, 2022	Ticket to Paradise	$10,179	Mrs. Harris Goes to Paris #3	
41	October 16, 2022	Halloween Ends	$158,155		
42	October 23, 2022	Halloween Ends	$79,278		
43	October 30, 2022	Halloween Ends	$26,317		
44	November 6, 2022	Halloween Ends	$26,329		
45	November 13, 2022	Prey for the Devil	$14,551		
46	November 20, 2022	Prey for the Devil	No box office data for the weekend of November 20 2022.		
47	November 27, 2022	$2,260			
48	December 4, 2022	Violent Night	$29,159		
49	December 11, 2022	Puss in Boots: The Last Wish	$119,665		
50	December 18, 2022	Violent Night	$6,736		
51	December 25, 2022	Puss in Boots: The Last Wish	$268,162		
52	January 1, 2023	Puss in Boots: The Last Wish	$265,299		

== See also ==
- 2022 in Ecuador

Preceded by 2021 Box office number-one films	Box office number-one films 2022	Succeeded by 2023 Box office number-one films
