= List of 2014 box office number-one films in Ecuador =

The following is a list of films that topped the weekend box office in Ecuador in 2014.

== Number-one films ==
Ochentaysete became the highest grossing film of 2014, despite not reaching #1 during the year.

#	Date	Film	Gross	Openings in the top 10
1	January 5, 2014	Frozen	$530,971	The Secret Life of Walter Mitty (#4), Ender's Game (#5), The Purge (#6)
2	January 12, 2014	Frozen	$370,455	Paranormal Activity: The Marked Ones (#2), The Wolf of Wall Street (#5), The Host (#7)
3	January 19, 2014	Frozen	$255,792	Underdogs (#3), Delivery Man (#4), American Hustle (#5)
4	January 26, 2014	Frozen	$170,613	Jack Ryan: Shadow Recruit (#3), The Book Thief (#6), Prisoners (#9)
5	February 2, 2014	Frozen	$151,480	47 Ronin (#2), I, Frankenstein (#3), Escape Plan (#6), Saving Mr. Banks (#7)
6	February 9, 2014	The Lego Movie	$290,108	RoboCop (#2)
7	February 16, 2014	RoboCop	$235,980	Justin Bieber's Believe (#3), About Time (#4), The Monuments Men (#5)
8	February 23, 2014	RoboCop	$117,859	Mr. Peabody & Sherman (#3), 12 Years a Slave (#4), Her (#7)
9	March 2, 2014	Mr. Peabody & Sherman	$217,997	Winter's Tale (#4), Dallas Buyers Club (#6)
10	March 9, 2014	300: Rise of an Empire	$422,401	Labor Day (#8)
11	March 16, 2014	300: Rise of an Empire	$240,786	Need for Speed (#2)
12	March 23, 2014	300: Rise of an Empire	$127,744	Devil's Due (#4), Grudge Match (#5)
13	March 30, 2014	Captain America: The Winter Soldier	$1,030,566	
14	April 6, 2014	Captain America: The Winter Soldier	$528,183	Noah (#2), Rio 2 (#3)
15	April 13, 2014	Captain America: The Winter Soldier	N/A	
16	April 20, 2014	Rio 2	$648,769	Son of God (#4), Pompeii (#5), Bears (#6), Endless Love (#7)
17	April 27, 2014	The Amazing Spider-Man 2	$682,851	
18	May 4, 2014	The Amazing Spider-Man 2	$427,439	Muppets Most Wanted (#3)
19	May 11, 2014	The Amazing Spider-Man 2	$204,835	The Other Woman (#2), Khumba (#4), Divergent (#5), Violetta: La emoción del concierto (#7)
20	May 18, 2014	Godzilla	$471,868	The Pirate Fairy (#2), Killing Season (#9)
21	May 25, 2014	X-Men: Days of Future Past	$618,373	
22	June 1, 2014	Maleficent	$845,080	Homefront (#6), The Big Wedding (#7), The Butler (#9)
23	June 8, 2014	Maleficent	$646,987	Edge of Tomorrow (#3), The Angriest Man in Brooklyn (#5)
24	June 15, 2014	Maleficent	$300,893	Blended (#2), How to Train Your Dragon 2 (#5), A Million Ways to Die in the West (#7)
25	June 22, 2014	Maleficent	$237,755	Million Dollar Arm (#6)
26	June 29, 2014	The Fault in Our Stars	$199,085	Transcendence (#6), 3 Days to Kill (#7), God's Not Dead (#10)
27	July 6, 2014	Transformers: Age of Extinction	$601,592	The Games Maker (#4), Justin and the Knights of Valour (#6), Nothing Left to Fear (#8), 2 Guns (#9)
28	July 13, 2014	Transformers: Age of Extinction	$674,809	
29	July 20, 2014	Transformers: Age of Extinction	$483,635	Planes: Fire & Rescue (#2), Dawn of the Planet of the Apes (#3), Max Adventures: Dinoterra (#4)
30	July 27, 2014	Dawn of the Planet of the Apes	$482,734	Cementerio General (#6), Jersey Boys (#9), Breathe In (#10)
31	August 3, 2014	Guardians of the Galaxy	$468,054	The Love Punch (#8), Draft Day (#9)
32	August 10, 2014	Teenage Mutant Ninja Turtles	$507,938	A Royal Affair (#10)
33	August 17, 2014	Teenage Mutant Ninja Turtles	$384,490	Deliver Us from Evil (#3), Neighbors (#5)
34	August 24, 2014	Teenage Mutant Ninja Turtles	$255,209	Into the Storm (#2), The Nut Job (#4), The Expendables 3 (#6), Adore (#8), The Paperboy (#9), Anina (#10)
35	August 31, 2014	Teenage Mutant Ninja Turtles	N/A	
36	September 7, 2014	Hercules	$217,318	Lucy (#2), Sex Tape (#3), If I Stay (#4), Skinwalkers (#7)
37	September 14, 2014	Lucy	$232,995	Dolphin Tale 2 (#3)
38	September 21, 2014	The Maze Runner	$193,788	As Above, So Below (#5), The Hundred-Foot Journey (#8), The Hypnotist (#10)
39	September 28, 2014	The Maze Runner	$155,955	Cantinflas (#2), 22 Jump Street (#4), The Boxtrolls (#5), The Purge: Anarchy (#7)
40	October 5, 2014	The Boxtrolls	$172,284	Gone Girl (#6), The Remaining (#9)
41	October 12, 2014	Alexander and the Terrible, Horrible, No Good, Very Bad Day	$224,274	Saint Seiya: Legend of Sanctuary (#2), The Equalizer (#6), The Book of Life (#7)
42	October 19, 2014	Dracula Untold	$208,062	The Judge (#5)
43	October 26, 2014	Annabelle	$737,163	Earth to Echo (#6), The F Word (#10)
44	November 2, 2014	Annabelle	$361,188	A Walk Among the Tombstones (#4), Step Up: All In (#6)
45	November 9, 2014	Interstellar	$157,769	Rec 4: Apocalypse (#7), Good Day, Ramon (#8), Oculus (#10)
46	November 16, 2014	Interstellar	$137,572	Mr. Jones (#7), Devil's Knot (#8), The Returned (#10)
47	November 23, 2014	The Hunger Games: Mockingjay – Part 1	$574,890	Boyhood (#7)
48	November 30, 2014	The Hunger Games: Mockingjay – Part 1	$279,797	Millionaire Dog (#2), Horrible Bosses 2 (#3), El Vientre (#5), Sin City: A Dame to Kill For (#6), When the Lights Went Out (#10)
49	December 7, 2014	The Hunger Games: Mockingjay – Part 1	$157,035	Wild Tales (#5), Apartment 1303 3D (#7), And So It Goes (#9)
50	December 14, 2014	The Hunger Games: Mockingjay – Part 1	$94,487	Let's Be Cops (#3), Brick Mansions (#5), Patrick (#8)
51	December 21, 2014	The Hobbit: The Battle of the Five Armies	$382,112	Night at the Museum: Secret of the Tomb (#2), V/H/S/2 (#10)
52	December 28, 2014	Big Hero 6	$568,312	
