= A Dog's Courage (novel) =

2021 novel by W. Bruce Cameron

- Author: W. Bruce Cameron
- Series: A Dog’s Way Home
- Publisher: Macmillan Publishers
- Publication date: May 4, 2021
- Pages: 336
- ISBN: 1529075866
- Preceded by: A Dog's Way Home

A Dog's Courage is a 2021 novel by W. Bruce Cameron and the sequel to his 2017 novel A Dog’s Way Home. In the book, the dog Bella gets separated from her masters and takes care of two orphaned cougar cubs.

== Synopsis ==
Bella now lives happily after reuniting with her masters, Lucas and Oliva. They are separated by a wildfire while on a camping trip. Now in the wilderness again, Bella takes care of two orphaned cougar cubs.
