= A Dog's Journey =

Book by W. Bruce Cameron

- First edition
- Author: W. Bruce Cameron
- Published: May 8, 2012
- Publisher: Forge Books
- Preceded by: A Dog's Purpose

A Dog's Journey is a 2012 book written by W. Bruce Cameron and published by Forge Books. It is the sequel to Cameron's 2010 book A Dog's Purpose. The film of the same name was released in May 2019.

== Plot ==
Bailey feels as if he has served his purpose by taking care of his deceased master, Ethan when he was alive, and Hannah and Ethan's other family members who live on the Farm. However, when Hannah's granddaughter, a toddler named Clarity June (CJ) comes to visit the Farm with her mother, Gloria, Bailey cannot help but feel that Ethan would want him to help her because her curiosity leads her to dangerous situations and Gloria does not pay attention to her. As a result, Bailey saves CJ from drowning and being trampled by a horse. Instead of admitting that she has been negligent and praising Bailey for his actions, Gloria blames him for each of CJ's predicaments and gets mad when CJ shows him affection. She later leaves the Farm with CJ after becoming angry when Hannah suggests that she take care of CJ so that Gloria can continue her singing career. Gloria wants the child support payments she receives from Hannah's son, Henry, who died in a plane crash. After some time, Bailey dies, thinking that he will not be reborn and that he has served his purpose.

Buddy is reborn, however. He realizes that he is now a female dog and his name is Molly. He tries to understand why he is back and then, one day, he sees Clarity who people now call CJ. She comes with her high school friend, Trent. Trent adopts Molly's brother, Rocky. Molly shows her love for CJ, but CJ says that Gloria will not allow her to have a dog. Not long afterwards, however, she returns and takes Molly home with her, planning to hide her from Gloria. The plan does not work, however, as Molly also tries to show Gloria love and reveals herself. Gloria tries to force CJ to get rid of Molly. CJ fights back by threatening to reveal Gloria's constant neglect of her. Gloria then tries to eliminate Molly by trying to kill the dog and then taking her to an animal shelter. CJ rescues Molly both times. She tries to get her away from Gloria by living with other people and then running away to California. As she is still a minor, she has to return home both times. During the fight for Molly, CJ gets in trouble for skipping school and giving Shane, a boy she dates, the key to the art department. He says he wants to get a copy of an upcoming test, but instead commits a more serious crime. CJ tries to get away from Shane, who continues to try to control her, with Gloria's blessings. CJ runs away from Gloria again when she discovers that she has spent all the money in CJ's trust fund. CJ was depending on the money to pay for her college education. When she leaves, Shane follows her and she has a car accident. Molly does not survive.

Buddy comes back to life again as a small dog named Max. His devotion to finding CJ almost causes Max's death, as he is not friendly to other people, so no one wants to adopt him. Finally, he sees CJ who is now a young woman living in New York. She agrees to take him even though she is dog sitting and living in an apartment that is not hers. As it turns out, Trent also lives in New York and he and CJ reunite. CJ is dating a married man. Trent has a girlfriend. Max recognizes Trent and is nice to him. During this period of her life, things do not go well for CJ, and she attempts suicide. Afterwards, Gloria tries to take her back to her house, but Trent intervenes. Upon leaving the hospital, CJ moves in with Trent. He has broken up with his girlfriend and he helps CJ by finding Hannah and arranging a trip to visit the Farm and nursing CJ back to health. CJ finally admits that she loves him in a romantic sense and the two get married. However, the suicide attempt ruined CJ's kidneys and she has to go on dialysis. She also goes to school and studies psychology. Max begins to signal that Trent has cancer, a skill he learned when he was Molly. CJ recognizes the signal and sends Trent to the doctor and Trent overcomes his cancer. After a long life with the both of them, Max dies.

Buddy is born one more time. This time he has the same name he had at the very beginning of his life, Toby, and he is not so anxious to find CJ, as he thinks that she will find him when she needs him. His job is to work at a hospice where he comforts dying patients. CJ finally does come, as Gloria is suffering from Alzheimer's and is in the hospice. Both CJ and Gloria are much older. Trent has died, but he and CJ lived a happy life. Gloria dies in the hospice with CJ and Toby by her side. CJ comes to work part time in the hospice. Then, one day, she checks herself in after deciding to end her dialysis treatment. She takes comfort in Toby's presence, telling him that he reminds her of her dogs Molly and Max. After she dies, Toby continues to serve his purpose which is to help many people. When he dies many years later, he does not come back. Instead he is greeted by all of his old masters and goes to be with them.

== Reviews ==
Library Journal called it a "multi-hanky read".
