= The Man Who Was Born Again =

1921 novel by Paul Busson

- Author: Paul Busson
- Original title: Die Wiedergeburt des Melchior Dronte
- Translator: Prince Mirski; Thomas Moult
- Language: German
- Publisher: Rikola
- Publication date: 1921
- Publication place: Austria
- English publication date: 1927
- Pages: 425

The Man Who Was Born Again (German: Die Wiedergeburt des Melchior Dronte. Der Roman einer Seelenwanderung, lit. 'The Rebirth of Melchior Dronte: The Novel of a Transmigration of the Soul') is a 1921 novel by the Austrian writer Paul Busson. It follows the occult struggles of the 18th-century nobleman Melchior von Dronte, as told by a man in whose body his soul has been reborn.

The New York Times called it "an anomalous and amorphous book that irritates as it piques the curiosity" with "an infinity of raw, often hideous detail". Time called it "graphic and brilliant" and "a grotesque, exciting and impudent tale of student ribaldry, army debauching and mystic romance".

== See also ==
- Metempsychosis
