= A Dog's Purpose (novel) =

2010 novel by W. Bruce Cameron

- First edition
- Author: W. Bruce Cameron
- Published: July 6, 2010
- Publisher: Forge Books
- Followed by: A Dog's Journey

A Dog's Purpose is a 2010 novel written by American author W. Bruce Cameron. It chronicles a dog's journey through four lives via reincarnation and how he looks for his purpose through each.

The novel was a New York Times bestseller for 49 weeks, garnering critical praise from such sources as Temple Grandin, famous for her study of cattle behavior; Kirkus Reviews; and Marty Becker, resident veterinarian on the early-morning television show, Good Morning America. A sequel followed in May 2012, titled A Dog's Journey, following the same dog after the events of the previous book. The film rights of the book were bought by DreamWorks. A film of the same name was released in January 2017.

== Plot ==
The narrator first starts out as a feral puppy. A few weeks later, after being nursed by their mother, a feral as well, the dog and his siblings Fast, Sister, and Hungry go outside of their den to explore the woods around them. Soon after, men come and capture them. The dogs arrive at a place called the Yard, where dozens of abandoned dogs reside under the guidance of a gentle old woman whom the narrator calls Senora. The narrator, named Toby by Senora, adjusts to his new lifestyle. One day, many of the newer dogs at the Yard are whisked off to a building (a veterinarian office). A new dog arrives, named Spike, who is very aggressive with the other dogs, and injures Toby. Not long after, animal control service agents arrive with orders to shut down the place due to poor sanitation and welfare conditions. Many dogs, including Toby, are subsequently euthanized.

Toby now is reincarnated as a Golden Retriever puppy and is nursing from a new mother. A few weeks after birth, when Toby and his new brothers and sisters have matured enough, he and the others are allowed to play outside the cage. Toby climbs up onto a table and bites the doorknob, opening the gate to the outside world and leaving him to explore the real world. A truck driver picks up Toby on the road and calls him "Fella." The man drives to a bar. After the man has been gone for several hours, Toby begins suffering from heat exhaustion in the cab.

A woman breaks the car window, and rescues Toby. She brings him home, and presents him to her eight-year-old son, Ethan. Toby is renamed Bailey. Over the course of many years, Bailey lives a full life with Ethan, and accompanies him through many difficulties, including arson, which leads to Ethan permanently injuring his leg, and ending his promising athletic career. Ethan goes to live with his grandparents at their farm in Michigan so he can be with his girlfriend Hannah and finish his senior year in high school. Around that time, things are not going well in the family, with Ethan's injury, an eventual breakup with Hannah, and a divorce between Ethan's parents. Soon after moving, Ethan goes off to college, leaving Bailey with infrequent visits from him during the holidays. Bailey's health starts to decline, with him taking naps very often and being weak. Soon, Ethan's mother and grandparents take him to the vet, where he is once again put down.

Bailey wakes up once again as a German Shepherd. Bailey, who realizes that he is now a girl, is picked out and named Ellie by a police officer, named Jakob, and trained to be a search-and-rescue dog. Jakob and Ellie find a kidnapped girl but while getting the man into custody he shoots Jakob, injuring him so that he can no longer be a policeman.

Ellie then gets put into the care of one of Jakob's colleagues, Maya. After dying from old age, he is reborn but this time as a Labrador Retriever with Wendi, his new owner, who is ecstatic with her new pet, whom she names Bear. She cannot keep him because of a no-pet rule in her apartment building. Instead, she gives him to her mother, who is dating an alcoholic. Neither treat Bear very well, and the mother's boyfriend, fed up with the dog upon receiving a notice that he needs to provide better living conditions, ditches him on a country road. Bear recognizes his surroundings, having been there before with Ethan. Using the skills he learned as Ellie, Bear is able to trail the scent of one of the farm's animals to the Farm, where Ethan lives. Ethan, now an elderly man, decides to keep Bear, who he renames Buddy, and marries Hannah. Years pass, and Ethan suffers from an apparent stroke, and as he is dying suddenly recognizes that Buddy is Bailey.

== Reception ==
Publishers Weekly called A Dog's Purpose "a tail-wagging three hanky boo-hooer" and "delightful". The Long Beach Post praised Cameron's ability to get inside a dog's psyche. The Christian Science Monitor recommended the book. The Washington Post criticized Cameron for "exploiting dogs' selflessness for his own mawkish ends".

== Series ==
The book was followed up by two sequels by Cameron, A Dog's Journey and A Dog's Promise.
