= Cathryn Michon =

American actress

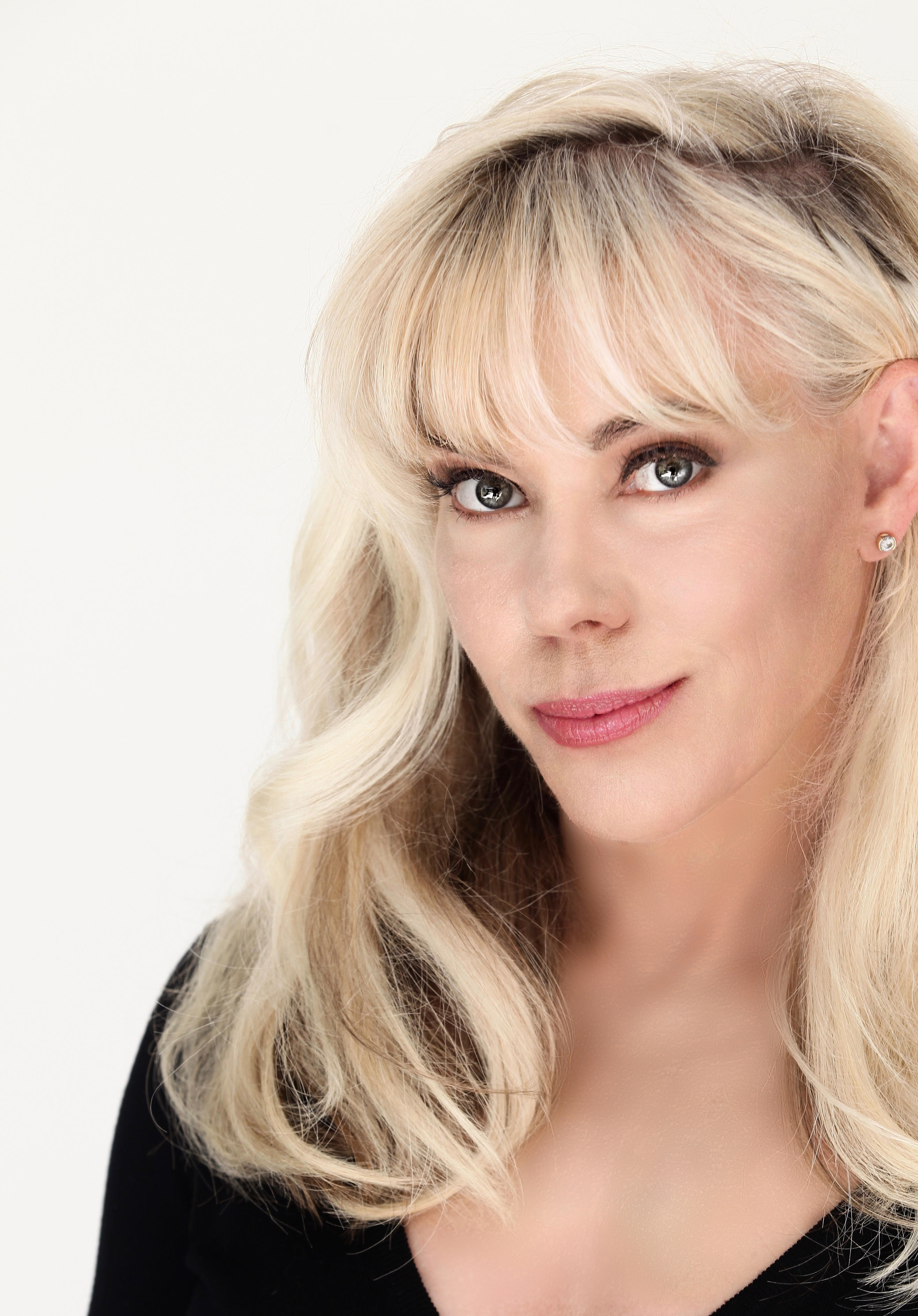
- Michon in 2019
- Occupations: Screenwriter, playwright, author, comedian, blogger, actress
- Known for: A Dog's Purpose, A Dog's Journey, Cook Off
- Spouse: W. Bruce Cameron

Cathryn Michon is a Los Angeles-based filmmaker, actress, writer, blogger and stand-up comic. She has been featured at the Montreal Comedy Festival, the Toyota Comedy Festival and the Marshall’s Women in Comedy Festival.

== Career ==
Her touring stand-up performance The Grrl Genius Club, as well as a subsequent novel sharing the same name, The Grrl Genius Guide to Life (HarperCollins, July 2001), lead to a television hosting stint on AMC's similarly titled Grrl Genius at the Movies and a second novel entry titled The Grrl Genius Guide to Sex with Other People (St. Martin's Press, January 2004), all garnering positive receptions nationwide.

Her television screenwriting credits include Designing Women, China Beach, Sisters, South Park and Diagnosis Murder. She performed at Chicago’s The Second City, which led to multiple roles in regional theaters, Off Broadway and on TV. She has guest starred on television series on ABC, CBS, HBO and AMC.

She was the co-writer, co-producer, co-director, and star of the movie Cook Off!, which completed principal photography in 2005 and premiered in February 2007 at the US Comedy Arts Festival in Aspen, Colorado. Other projects include the 2014 film Muffin Top: A Love Story, in which she starred, wrote and directed, the 2017 film A Dog's Purpose and A Dog's Journey, both of which she co-wrote.

=== Books ===
She is the author of the "Grrl Genius Guidebooks": The Grrl Genius Guide to Life (HarperCollins, July 2001) and The Grrl Genius Guide to Sex with Other People (St. Martin's Press, January 2004.)

Michon is the author of Jane Austen’s Little Advice Book (co-written with Pam Norris) and co-wrote Eight Human Talents: The Yoga Way to Restore The Balance and Serenity Within You (2001) with Gurmukh.

== Columns ==
Michon wrote columns for iVillage.com and has a blog on that same site entitled "Adventures of a Grrl Genius"
