= W. Bruce Cameron =

American humor columnist (born 1956)

- Born: William Bruce Cameron; February 2, 1960 (age 66); Petoskey, Michigan, U.S.
- Writing career
- Period: Contemporary literature

William Bruce Cameron (born February 2, 1960) is an American author, columnist, and humorist. Cameron is most famous for his novel A Dog's Purpose, which spent 52 weeks on the New York Times bestseller list. The book is the basis for the movie version starring Dennis Quaid, Britt Robertson, Peggy Lipton, K.J. Apa, Juliet Rylance, Luke Kirby, John Ortiz, and Pooch Hall, and released in theaters on January 27, 2017. A Dog's Purpose is followed by a sequel called A Dog's Journey, which Cameron, along with Cathryn Michon, adapted into a film of the same name.

== Life and career ==
Cameron was born in Petoskey, Michigan. He is also the author of the best-selling self-improvement book 8 Simple Rules for Dating My Teenage Daughter, which was later adapted into the ABC sitcom of the same name that aired from 2002 to 2005. His book 8 Simple Rules for Marrying My Daughter was released in 2008 and already had a Hollywood movie deal before its publication, with 89 Films and Wendy Finerman, producer of The Devil Wears Prada. Cameron is also the author of How to Remodel a Man, which was excerpted in the August 2005 issue of O, The Oprah Magazine, and was the subject of the November 1, 2005 Oprah Show. His novel A Dog's Purpose was published in July 2010 by Tom Doherty Associates. It was 19 weeks on The New York Times Best Seller list in its hardcover release. The softcover version was released on May 24, 2011. In total, A Dog's Purpose has spent a year on The New York Times Bestseller list (hardcover and paperback combined).

He wrote a weekly column for Creators Syndicate from 2001 until 2015 that appeared in around 50 newspapers in the U.S. and Canada, including Hawaii's MidWeek; "8 Simple Rules" told his humorous cautionary tales and memories of his life and was named after his bestselling book. In 2012, overwhelmed with other work, Cameron put it on hold after 689 editions. Cameron's 2017 novel A Dog's Way Home inspired the 2019 film of the same name. The 2012 sequel to A Dog's Purpose, entitled A Dog's Journey, was adapted by Cameron and his wife, Cathryn Michon, into a film of the same name, directed by Gail Mancuso. A film of A Dog's Perfect Christmas is released on Netflix in 2026.

== Published works ==
A Dog's Purpose

- A Dog's Purpose: A Novel for Humans, Forge (2010) ISBN 9780765326263
- A Dog's Journey, Forge (2012) ISBN 9780765330536
- A Dog's Promise, Forge (2019) ISBN 9781250163516

A Dog's Way Home

- A Dog's Way Home, Forge (2017) ISBN 9780765374653
- A Dog's Courage, Forge (2021) ISBN 9781250257628

Ruddy McCann

- The Midnight Dog of the Repo Man: A Short Story, Forge (2014) ASIN B00N03AO2S
- The Midnight Plan of the Repo Man, Forge (2014) ISBN 9780765377487
- Repo Madness, Forge (2016) ISBN 9780765377500

Standalone Novels

- Emory's Gift, Forge (2011) ISBN 9780765326263
- The Dogs of Christmas, Forge (2013) ISBN 9780765330550
- The Dog Master, Forge (2015) ISBN 9780765330550
- A Dog's Perfect Christmas, Forge (2020) ISBN 9781250163585
- Love, Clancy: Diary of a Good Dog, Forge (2023) ISBN 9781250163547

For Young Readers

- A Dog's Purpose Puppy Tales
  - Ellie's Story, Starscape (2015) ISBN 9780765374691
  - Bailey's Story, Starscape (2016) ISBN 9780765388407
  - Molly's Story, Starscape (2017) ISBN 9780765394934
  - Max's Story, Starscape (2018) ISBN 9780765395016
  - Toby's Story, Starscape (2019) ISBN 9780765394989
  - Cooper's Story, Starscape (2021) ISBN 9781250163387
- A Dog's Way Home Puppy Tales
  - Shelby's Story, Starscape (2018) ISBN 9780765301918
  - Bella's Story, Starscape (2020) ISBN 9781250212764
- Lily's Story, Starscape (2019) ISBN 9781250213518
- Lily to the Rescue series
  - Lily to the Rescue (2020) ISBN 9781250234353
  - Two Little Piggies (2020) ISBN 9781250234452
  - The Not-So-Stinky Skunk (2020) ISBN 9781250234483
  - Dog Dog Goose (2020) ISBN 9781250234520
  - Lost Little Leopard (2021) ISBN 9781250762566
  - The Misfit Donkey (2021) ISBN 9781250762689
  - Foxes in a Fix (2021) ISBN 9781250762726
  - The Three Bears (2021) ISBN 9781250762511

Nonfiction

- 8 Simple Rules for Dating My Teenage Daughter, Workman (2001)
- How to Remodel a Man, St. Martin's Press (2004)
- 8 Simple Rules for Marrying My Daughter, Touchstone (2008)
- A Dad's Purpose, Amazon Digital Services (2017) ASIN B06Y6GRPYY

== Awards ==
- 2006: The Robert Benchley Society Award for Humor
- 2006: The National Society of Newspaper Columnists Award for Best Humor
- 2011: Columnist of the Year National Society of Newspaper Columnists
