= A Dog's Journey (film) =

2019 film by Gail Mancuso

- Theatrical release poster
- Directed by: Gail Mancuso
- Screenplay by: W. Bruce Cameron; Cathryn Michon; Maya Forbes; Wally Wolodarsky
- Based on: A Dog's Journey by W. Bruce Cameron
- Produced by: Gavin Polone
- Starring: Marg Helgenberger; Betty Gilpin; Henry Lau; Kathryn Prescott; Dennis Quaid; Josh Gad
- Cinematography: Rogier Stoffers
- Edited by: Robert Komatsu
- Music by: Mark Isham
- Production companies: Amblin Entertainment; Reliance Entertainment; Walden Media; Alibaba Pictures; Pariah Entertainment Group
- Distributed by: Universal Pictures
- Release date: May 17, 2019 (United States)
- Running time: 109 minutes
- Countries: United States; India; China
- Language: English
- Budget: $16 million
- Box office: $75.8 million

A Dog's Journey is a 2019 adventure comedy drama film directed by Gail Mancuso in her feature film directorial debut and written by W. Bruce Cameron, Cathryn Michon, Maya Forbes, and Wally Wolodarsky. The film is based on the 2012 novel of the same name by Cameron and is the sequel to the 2017 film A Dog's Purpose. The film stars Josh Gad, Dennis Quaid, Marg Helgenberger, Betty Gilpin, Kathryn Prescott, and Henry Lau in his film debut.

The film is a co-production between Amblin Entertainment, Reliance Entertainment, Walden Media, and Alibaba Pictures and was released by Universal Pictures in the United States on May 17, 2019. Like its predecessor, it received mixed reviews from critics.

== Plot ==
In the previous film, Bailey reunited with his longtime owner Ethan after being reincarnated as a new dog. Now a St. Bernard/Australian Shepherd, Bailey lives with Ethan, Ethan's wife Hannah, Gloria (the widow of Hannah's son and Ethan's stepson Henry), and her 2-year-old daughter C.J. on their farm in Michigan. Gloria's suspicious nature leads her to move out with C.J.. Shortly after, Ethan discovers a tumor in Bailey's stomach. Before Bailey is euthanized, Ethan asks him to take care of C.J. once he is reincarnated again.

Nine years later, Bailey, reincarnated as a female beagle named Molly, sees a now 11-year-old C.J. with her best friend Trent Mahoney and his parents, who are adopting the former's brother Rocky. Molly runs outside to C.J., who secretly adopts her. Upon finding out, Gloria reluctantly allows C.J. to keep Molly to compensate for her neglectful parenting.

C.J. and Molly grow increasingly close over the years, along with Trent and Rocky. Now a teenager, C.J. tells Trent she wants to drop out of high school and move to New York City with her deceased father Henry's insurance settlement to become a musician. C.J. begins to date a boy named Shane, who Molly distrusts. Attending a party that gets busted by police for underage drinking, C.J. is sentenced to community service where Molly learns how to detect cancer.

Days after breaking up, Shane assaults C.J., prompting Molly to bite him. While drunk, Gloria responds nonchalantly to C.J.'s distress and reveals she spent all of Henry's settlement money, prompting C.J. to leave town with Molly. On the way out, they are stalked and tail-ended by Shane, which causes her car to flip, killing Molly.

Molly is reincarnated as a male English Mastiff named Big Dog, who lives with a convenience store owner in Pennsylvania. One day, C.J. visits the shop and is lovingly greeted by Big Dog. He mistakenly believes that C.J. recognizes him, is heartbroken when she leaves without him, and spends the rest of that life missing her.

Big Dog is reincarnated as a male Biewer Terrier named Max, who is adopted by C.J.. While C.J. is working as a dog walker, Max detects Trent's scent down the hall and pulls her toward his door. C.J. and Trent reconnect with each other. Max is eager to reunite C.J. and Trent, despite each of them being in live-in relationships of their own, and the fact that Rocky is gone. Max intentionally misbehaves around C.J.'s boyfriend, Barry, after which they break up and C.J. moves out with Max. They stay with various friends of C.J.'s before Max spots Trent and his girlfriend on the street, and Trent offers his guest room to C.J..

Remembering how to diagnose cancer during his life as Molly, Max signals to C.J. that he detects it on Trent, and C.J. urges Trent to see a doctor. The doctor confirms, and Trent begins chemo. His girlfriend leaves him, so C.J. becomes his primary caretaker. Once Trent is cancer-free, he urges C.J. to accept a meeting with Gloria, who is sober. Gloria tearfully apologizes for her abusive nature and gives C.J. some of the things sent from Ethan and Hannah. They inspire C.J. to write more songs and to perform, overcoming her longstanding stage fright and beginning her musical career.

Trent encourages C.J. to go on a road trip with him and Max to her grandparents’ farm, where she reunites with Ethan and Hannah for the first time since she was a toddler. Ethan recognizes Max as Bailey and tells C.J. of the dog's reincarnations, proving it by having Max perform a trick that only Bailey would know. C.J. and Trent then confess their love for one another and praise Max/Bailey for reuniting them.

C.J. and Trent marry, and shortly after C.J. releases her first music album, they have a son named Saint. Gloria reconciles with her daughter and in-laws, reuniting the family. Ethan dies of old age, surrounded by Max and the rest of his family. Max later ages and dies as well. The final scene shows Max running through a grassy field, morphing backwards through his previous incarnations, before crossing the Rainbow Bridge and reuniting with Ethan in heaven as Bailey.

== Cast ==
- Josh Gad as the voice of Bailey, Molly, Big Dog and Max, the different incarnations of “Boss Dog”.
  - Bruce as Bailey, a St. Bernard and Australian shepherd Mix, Ethan's dog
  - Elle, Rosebud, Diane, Rydel, and Lemy as Molly, a beagle, C.J.'s first dog
  - Scott as Big Dog, an English mastiff
  - Belle as Max, a Biewer Terrier, C.J.'s second dog
- Dennis Quaid as Ethan Montgomery, Henry's stepfather, Gloria's father-in-law, Hannah's husband, Bailey's owner and C.J.'s paternal step-grandfather.
- Marg Helgenberger as Hannah Montgomery, Henry's mother, Gloria's mother-in-law, Ethan's wife and C.J.'s paternal grandmother. Helgenberger replaces Peggy Lipton from the first film.
- Betty Gilpin as Gloria Mitchell, Ethan and Hannah's daughter-in-law and C.J.'s neglectful and emotionally abusive mother.
- Kathryn Prescott as Clarity June "C.J." Mitchell-Montgomery, Henry & Gloria's daughter, Trent's love interest, Ethan & Hannah's granddaughter, and Saint's mother.
  - Abby Ryder Fortson as Young C.J.
  - Emma Volk as Toddler C.J.
- Henry Lau as Trent Mahoney, C.J.'s best friend & love interest later husband and Saint's father.
  - Ian Chen as Young Trent
- Jake Manley as Shane, a criminal Mr. Sub employee who temporarily dates C.J., and later unknowingly and indirectly kills Molly.
- Johnny Galecki as Henry Montgomery, Hannah and Ethan's deceased son, Gloria's late husband and C.J.'s late father.
- Kevin Claydon as Barry, C.J.’s former boyfriend in New York City.
- Daniela Barbosa as Liesl, Trent's former girlfriend in New York City.
- Conrad Coates as Joe, Big Dog's owner who runs a gas station.
- Victoria Sanchez as Andi, the owner of the dog shelter where C.J. serves community service.
- Beckett Richard Pin as Saint Mahoney, C.J. and Trent's infant son who appears at the end of the film.
  - Tyler Asher Xin-Qin as Newborn Saint

== Production ==
On June 21, 2017, CEO of Amblin Entertainment Michael Wright announced that a sequel to the film A Dog's Purpose was in development.

On August 26, 2018, Universal Pictures began production on the sequel.

Principal photography began in August 2018.

== Release ==
The film was released by Universal Pictures on May 17, 2019. It was released by Entertainment One in foreign territories, where actor Peter Baykov is the voice of Trent for international release.

== Home media ==
A Dog's Journey was released on digital on 6 August and Blu-ray, DVD and on-demand on 20 August from Universal Pictures Home Entertainment.

Blu-ray Bonus Features Include:

- Deleted and Extended Scenes
- Gag Reel
- A DOG'S Sequel, New and returning cast members discuss their roles in A Dog's Journey and share their appreciation for director Gail Mancuso.
- Everyone's Best Friend.
- Sit down with the cast to hear about their life-long love of man's best friend.
- Working with Dogs - Cast and crew share the joys of working with animal-actors.
- A Healing Journey - Josh Gad, Dennis Quaid and others discuss the bond between dogs and humans.
- Scoring the JOURNEY - Director Gail Mancuso and composer Mark Isham discuss the music in the film.
- Feature Commentary with Director Gail Mancuso

== Reception ==
=== Box office ===
A Dog's Journey grossed $22.7 million in the United States and Canada, and $52.8 million in other territories, for a worldwide total of $75.6 million.

In the United States and Canada, the film was released alongside John Wick: Chapter 3 – Parabellum and The Sun Is Also a Star, and was projected to gross $10–14 million from 3,267 theaters in its opening weekend. It ended up debuting to just $8 million, the lowest opening of any of W. Bruce Cameron's Dog films. In its second weekend the film made $4.1 million, finishing seventh, and then $1 million in its third.

=== Critical response ===
On review aggregator website Rotten Tomatoes, the film holds an approval rating of 53% based on 86 reviews with an average rating of 5.2/10. The website's critical consensus reads: "A Dog's Journey is as sentimental as one might expect, but even cynical viewers may find their ability to resist shedding a tear stretched to the puppermost limit." Metacritic, which uses a weighted average, assigned the film a score of 43 out of 100, based on 16 critics, indicating "mixed or average reviews". Audiences polled by CinemaScore gave the film an average grade of A on an A+ to F scale, the same as its predecessor, while those at PostTrak gave it 3.5 out of 5 stars.
