= A Dog's Purpose (film) =

2017 film by Lasse Hallström

- Theatrical release poster
- Directed by: Lasse Hallström
- Screenplay by: W. Bruce Cameron; Cathryn Michon; Audrey Wells; Maya Forbes; Wally Wolodarsky
- Based on: A Dog's Purpose by W. Bruce Cameron
- Produced by: Gavin Polone
- Starring: Britt Robertson; KJ Apa; John Ortiz; Dennis Quaid; Josh Gad
- Cinematography: Terry Stacey
- Edited by: Robert Leighton
- Music by: Rachel Portman
- Production companies: Amblin Entertainment; Reliance Entertainment; Walden Media; Pariah Entertainment Group
- Distributed by: Universal Pictures
- Release date: January 27, 2017
- Running time: 100 minutes
- Country: United States
- Language: English
- Budget: $22 million
- Box office: $205 million

A Dog's Purpose is a 2017 American adventure comedy-drama film directed by Lasse Hallström and written by W. Bruce Cameron, Cathryn Michon, Audrey Wells, Maya Forbes, and Wally Wolodarsky, based on the 2010 novel of the same name by W. Bruce Cameron. The film stars Britt Robertson, KJ Apa in his film debut, Juliet Rylance, John Ortiz and Dennis Quaid with Josh Gad in multiple voice roles. It explores themes of loyalty, grief, and dysfunctional families over a series of reincarnations.

The film is a co-production between Amblin Entertainment, Reliance Entertainment, Walden Media, and Pariah Entertainment Group. It was released by Universal Pictures on January 27, 2017, and grossed $205 million worldwide, and received mixed reviews from critics. It was Peggy Lipton's final film role before her death in 2019.

A sequel, titled A Dog's Journey, was released on May 17, 2019.

== Plot ==
In the 1950s, a feral puppy wonders about life's true purpose. Weeks later, he is caught by dog catchers, taken to the pound, and euthanized.

The dog is reborn as a Red Retriever in 1961. Leaving his cage at a puppy mill, he is taken by two garbage men who plan to sell him. Left locked inside their pick-up truck, he begins to die of heatstroke, but is rescued by an eight-year-old boy named Ethan Montgomery and his mother Elizabeth. They break the truck's window and bring him home, naming him Bailey. After his father Jim reluctantly allows him to keep the dog, Ethan bonds with Bailey quickly, especially over the summer at the farm of Ethan's grandparents Fran and Bill, and Bailey decides Ethan alone is his purpose.

Years pass, and after several attempts at advancing in his job fail, Jim has become an alcoholic. In 1969, Ethan meets Hannah at a fair with Bailey, and they soon begin dating. They spend their summer together through senior year. They plan to go to the same college, Ethan getting a football scholarship and Hannah with an academic one. At home one night, a drunken Jim becomes abusive towards Ethan and Elizabeth. Ethan orders him to leave and never return, which he does.

Later in 1971 at a football game watched by scouts, Ethan is offered a full scholarship to Michigan State. That night, his vindictive classmate Todd throws a lit firecracker into Ethan's house, causing a house fire. Bailey alerts Ethan, who saves his mother out through an upstairs window. Ethan lowers her, then Bailey. However, he loses his rope and has to jump, fracturing his leg. Bailey attacks Todd, who is arrested by the police when firecrackers fall out of his pocket. With his athletic scholarship canceled, Ethan has to go to an agricultural school, where he will learn to take over the farm. Depressed, Ethan breaks up with Hannah before leaving for college, while Bailey stays with Fran and Bill. Bailey ages and Ethan comes to say goodbye as he dies.

Bailey is reborn as a female German Shepherd puppy, growing into a police dog named Ellie, in the late 1970s/early 1980s, while fully retaining memories of her past lives. Ellie is partnered with officer Carlos Ruiz, who has recently split up with his partner of the Chicago Police Department and works hard at "seeking" and "finding", now seeing the job as life's purpose. They form a close bond, ending after Ellie saves a girl, kidnapped by her mother's ex-boyfriend, from drowning and is then fatally shot by the kidnapper while protecting Carlos.

Reborn in the mid-1980s as a male Corgi, Bailey is adopted by Atlanta college student Maya, who names him Tino. Lonely, he tries to find her happiness. She meets Al, a classmate, after Tino falls for Al's dog, a female Landseer named Roxy. They marry, having three children. Tino is heartbroken when one day Roxy does not return from the vet. As a now elderly Tino dies, he thanks Maya for giving him one of his best lives.

Bailey reincarnates again, this time as a St. Bernard/Australian Shepherd mix puppy in 2014. At first adopted by Wendi, he is named Waffles. Wendi's husband neglects him, refuses to let her keep him inside, and after several years, abandons him. Waffles searches for a new life, gradually returning to where he spent summers as Bailey. He reunites with his old master Ethan, now in his 60s, living on his grandparents' old farm. Not recognizing him, Ethan takes him to the local animal shelter, but later reclaims him, naming him Buddy.

Finally sensing that he has finally found his true purpose, he reunites Ethan with a widowed Hannah, and they get married. Buddy shows Ethan that he is his beloved childhood dog, by performing tricks and responding to phrases that were known only to the two of them many years back, such as "boss dog". Ethan finds Bailey's collar, now old and rusty, and places it back on Bailey's neck, and they resume playing exactly the way they did years ago. Bailey narrates that life is about having fun, saving others, finding someone to be with, not getting upset over the past or the future, and living for today.

== Cast ==
- Josh Gad as the voice of Bailey, Ellie, Tino and Buddy, the reincarnations of "Boss Dog", the main protagonist.
- Dennis Quaid as Ethan Montgomery, an old man who owns and runs his maternal grandparents' old farm.
  - KJ Apa as teenager Ethan Montgomery, a popular football player who later gets injured and has to become a farmer.
  - Bryce Gheisar as eight-year-old Ethan Montgomery, a young boy interested in comics and football.
- Peggy Lipton as Hannah, an old woman who is widowed and has two children.
  - Britt Robertson as teenager Hannah, the supportive and intelligent girlfriend of Ethan.
- John Ortiz as Carlos Ruiz, Ellie's partner who trains her as a police dog.
- Logan Miller as Todd, Ethan's rival who is vindictive and jealous of him.
- Juliet Rylance as Elizabeth Montgomery, Ethan's mother in an unhappy and abusive marriage to Jim, whom she later divorces.
- Luke Kirby as Jim Montgomery, Ethan's abusive father in an unhappy and abusive marriage with Elizabeth and a depressed alcoholic.
- Gabrielle Rose as Fran, Ethan's maternal grandmother.
- Michael Bofshever as Bill, Ethan's maternal grandfather and a farmer.
- Kirby Howell-Baptiste as Maya Williams, a shy young woman who adopts Tino.
- Pooch Hall as Al, a young man who dates and later marries Maya, and has three children Bree, Ty & Richie with her.

== Production ==
In 2015, DreamWorks acquired the film rights for Cameron's novel. On May 8, 2015, it was announced Lasse Hallström would direct the film. On August 5, 2015, Britt Robertson and Dennis Quaid joined the cast. On September 18, 2015, Pooch Hall was cast in the film. On October 15, 2015, Bradley Cooper joined the cast to play Bailey's inner voice, but the role was eventually performed by Josh Gad. Principal photography began on August 17, 2015. During production, controversy ensued over treatment of a dog during filming.

== Release ==
In December 2015, the film switched from a DreamWorks Pictures release to under the Amblin Entertainment banner as per Amblin Partners' newly enacted branded strategy. The film was released by Universal Pictures on January 27, 2017. Universal also distributed it overseas, except for countries where Mister Smith Entertainment handled international sales.

== Reception ==
=== Box office ===
A Dog's Purpose grossed $64.5 million in the United States and Canada and $140.5 million in other territories for a worldwide gross of $205 million, against a production budget of $22 million.

In North America, it was released alongside Resident Evil: The Final Chapter and Gold, and was projected to gross $18–22 million from 3,050 theaters in its opening weekend, slightly lower than initial $27 million tracking had the film debuting to before boycotts against the film were called for. It made $466,000 from Thursday-night previews and $5.3 million on its first day. It ended up debuting to $18.2 million, finishing second at the box office behind the second weekend of Universal's own Split. The film dropped 40.6% in its second weekend, grossing $10.8 million and finishing third at the box office.

=== Critical response ===
On Rotten Tomatoes, the film has an approval rating of 35% based on reviews from 147 critics, with an average rating of 4.9/10. The site's critics consensus reads, "A Dog's Purpose offers an awkward blend of sugary sentiment and canine suffering that tugs at animal-loving audiences' heartstrings with shameless abandon." On Metacritic, the film has a weighted average score of 43 out of 100 based on 32 critics, indicating "mixed or average" reviews. Audiences polled by CinemaScore gave the film an average grade of "A" on an A+ to F scale.

Andrew Barker of Variety wrote: "Viewed in a vacuum, it's hard to fault the movie's earnestness; Hallström's canine cinema pedigree (which includes the superior Hachi: A Dog's Tale) shows through; and Rachel Portman's score is understandably sentimental without going completely saccharine." Frank Scheck of The Hollywood Reporter wrote: "While the human performers are more than adequate, there's no doubt that the canine stars carry the day. Their utter irresistibility helps a long way in terms of getting past the corny plot machinations of A Dog's Purpose."

=== Home media ===
A Dog's Purpose was released on digital HD on April 18, 2017, and was followed by a release on Blu-ray and DVD on May 2, 2017, from Universal Pictures Home Entertainment. The film topped the home-video sales chart for the week ending on May 7, 2017.

== Controversy ==
On January 18, 2017, a video surfaced on TMZ showing footage taken from the set of the film, which shows a male German Shepherd named Hercules being dragged and dipped into rushing water while visibly resisting. After a cut in the video, the next clip shows the dog being submerged in the water at the other end of the tank while a voice on set can be heard shouting "Cut it!", and various people are then seen rushing towards the dog. The American Humane Association, which ensures that animals are not harmed in entertainment productions, announced that its representative on set had been suspended over the incident, and that the incident was under further investigation. PETA called for a boycott of the film. Actor Josh Gad, who voices the dog in the movie and was not on set during the making of the film, said he was "shaken and sad to see any animal put in a situation against its will". Director Lasse Hallström said via Twitter that he "did not witness" the actions in the video, and was "very disturbed" by the footage. Due to the release of the video, Universal Pictures cancelled the film's scheduled January 19 Los Angeles premiere.

Amblin Entertainment released a statement in regard to the incident, saying, "on the day of the shoot, Hercules did not want to perform the stunt portrayed on the tape, so the Amblin production team did not proceed with filming that shot," and "Hercules is happy and healthy." On February 4, 2017, the American Humane Association reported that an independent third-party animal-cruelty expert had concluded that safety measures on the set of the film were in place and the video had been deliberately edited to mislead the public.

== Sequel ==
On June 21, 2017, CEO of Amblin Entertainment Michael Wright announced that a sequel was in development. On August 26, 2018, Universal began production on the sequel, which is directed by Gail Mancuso, and was released on May 17, 2019. In addition to Quaid and Gad reprising their roles, the cast also includes Marg Helgenberger (replacing Peggy Lipton, who had become seriously ill), Betty Gilpin, Kathryn Prescott, and Henry Lau.
