= 2018 attacks on the northern border of Ecuador =

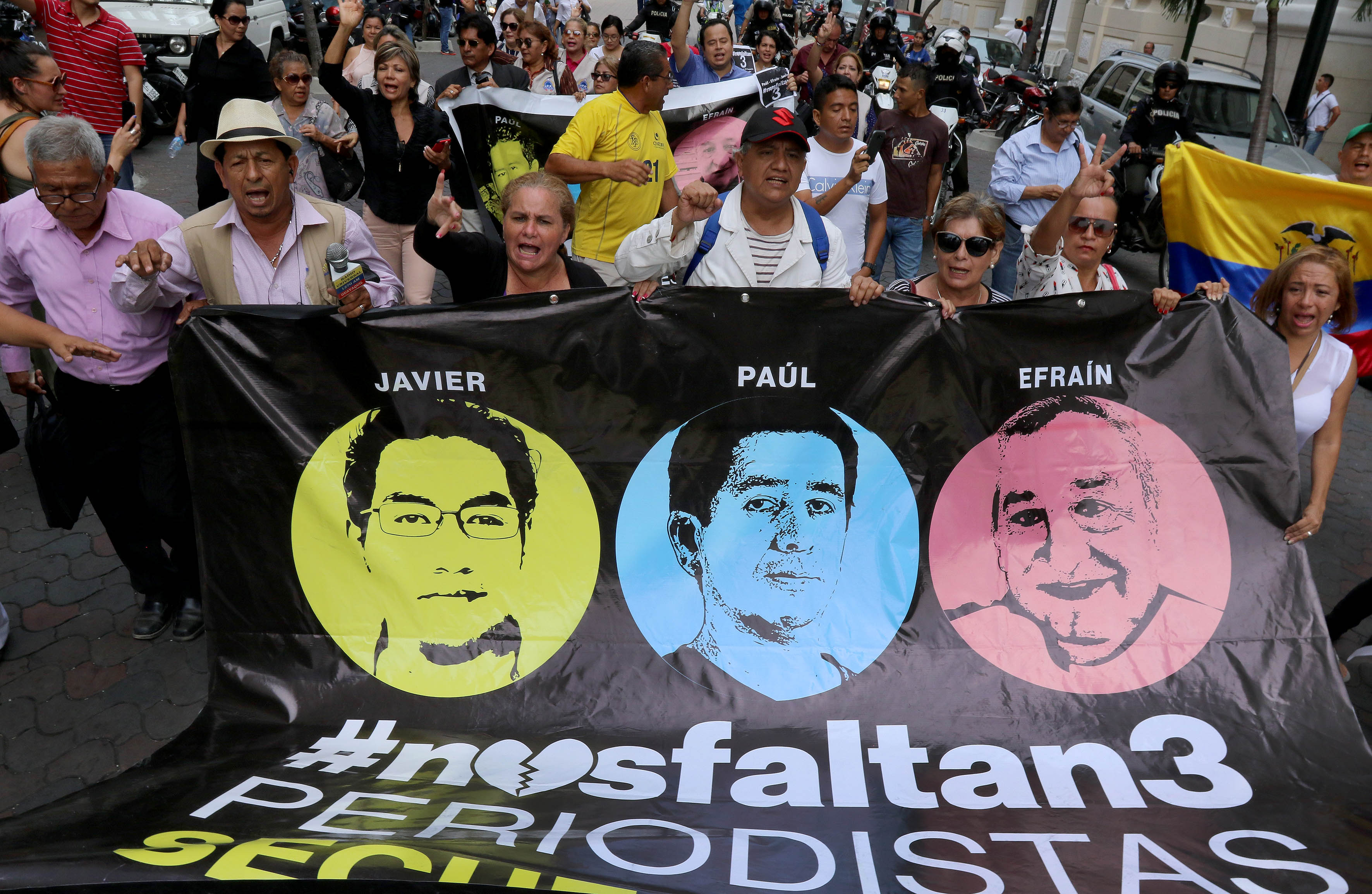
- Location: Esmeraldas, Ecuador
- Date: January 27, 2018 – July 4, 2018
- Weapon: Car bomb
- Deaths: 5
- Perpetrators: Frente Oliver Sinisterra; Comité Base Mantaro Rojo; Frente de Defensa de Luchas del Pueblo de Ecuador
- Motive: War on drugs in Ecuador
- Inquiry: 27

A series of terrorist attacks took place in the towns of San Lorenzo, Mataje and Viche in the Esmeraldas Province, Northern Ecuador. The attacks began on January 7, 2018, outside the facilities of the San Lorenzo National Police district where, in the early morning hours, a car bomb exploded leaving 28 people injured, as well as severe damage to the infrastructure of the police precinct and 37 homes in the vicinity. In preliminary investigations, Ecuadorian authorities linked this incident to criminal organizations linked to drug trafficking and the illegal drug trade.

In the days following the attack in San Lorenzo, several minor attacks began to be recorded. On March 22, another explosion occurred from a bombing located on the side of the San Lorenzo-Mataje highway, which caused the death of 3 marines, in addition to leaving 7 more injured. The crisis worsened on March 26 with the kidnapping and murders of journalists from El Comercio, who were covering a report on the events that were taking place in Mataje and its surroundings.

The kidnapping and subsequent murder of the journalists, as well as the responsibility for several of the attacks, have been attributed to the Oliver Sinisterra Front, a dissident group of the Daniel Aldana Mobile Column of the Revolutionary Armed Forces of Colombia (FARC), who refused to lay down their arms, refusing to accept the peace agreements between this guerrilla and the Colombian government, calling themselves an "active front", but Colombia does not call them an insurgent group but rather a criminal group, calling it a Residual Organized Armed Group (GAOR).

It is believed by the government that it was not only the Oliver Sinesterra Front involved, but that the Red Mantaro Base Committee and the Defense Front of People's Struggles of Ecuador also participated.

== Attack in San Lorenzo ==
On Saturday, January 27, 2018, at 01:40 in the morning, a car bomb exploded in the parking lot behind the headquarters building of the San Lorenzo District Police Command, in the San Lorenzo Canton, Esmeraldas Province, near the Colombia–Ecuador border. The detonation affected the structure of the police precinct, destroying the rear wall and windows of the building where the dining room and bedrooms function; In addition, it affected 37 surrounding homes that were located within a radius of 50 metres. There were no fatalities, however, it left 28 people injured, of which 14 were police officers who were in the building.

January 27, 2018

- 01:40 — Car bomb explosion outside a police checkpoint in San Lorenzo

March 17, 2018

- 02:30 — Detonation of explosive material near a naval checkpoint in Borbón

March 18, 2018

- 09:00 approx. — Bursts of gunfire against soldiers in the El Pan sector.
- 09:40 — Detonation of an explosive device against a police vehicle in the Alto Tambo sector.

March 20, 2018

- — Detonation of explosive device against military vehicle in Mataje

The injured were immediately treated at the Divina Providencia hospital and at the health center in that town. Due to their minor injuries, they were discharged around noon. The report on the material damage was given by Police Colonel Richard Carolys, while the evaluation and actions at the scene included the participation of military personnel from the Ecuadorian Navy.

President Lenín Moreno signed the same day the decree of state of exception valid for 60 days only with effect in the cantons of San Lorenzo and Eloy Alfaro in an attempt to strengthen security in the area. The first theories about the attack postulated that the attack was carried out by criminal organizations linked to drug trafficking.

First attacks on the Army

On February 19, 2018, two soldiers were injured in an attack with artisanal mortars by dissidents of the former FARC guerrilla against Ecuadorian soldiers in the Pan zone in Esmeraldas Province. The uniformed men suffered minor injuries.

== Attack in Borbón ==
48 days after the attack in San Lorenzo, on Saturday, March 17, 2018, around 02:30 in the morning, another detonation was recorded near a naval checkpoint of the Ecuadorian Navy in the town of Borbón, in the Eloy Alfaro canton. The explosive device was homemade and consisted of a cable that was connected at one end to a jute bag loaded with gunpowder, and the other end connected to an electricity meter of a church located 100 meters from the checkpoint according to the respective police report. There were no fatalities or serious injuries, but there was material damage to infrastructure. The explosion affected the surrounding area smashing the windows of the Fire Department building, the Parish Government, the communal house and other surrounding homes. Only three sailors were slightly injured after the attack and the collapse of part of the wall of that military post was reported.

The attack occurred while an operation called "Libertador" was being carried out in several towns in the provinces of Esmeraldas and Guayas, which included the participation of 13 tax agents from the Office of the Attorney General of Colombia and elements from the Colombian Prosecutor's Office and from the United States, the Federal Bureau of Investigation (FBI). Authorities considered that the objective of the attack was to create a distraction during the raids resulting from the operation. After the operation, 20 homes were raided (18 in Esmeraldas, 2 in Guayas) and 5 people linked to Walter Patricio Arízala Vernaza (Alias Guacho) were arrested, who was suspected of being responsible for the attack in San Lorenzo.

== Minor incidents in Alto Tambo and El Pan ==
After the attack in Borbón, on Sunday, March 18, two incidents occurred in the San Lorenzo canton. The first occurred in the town of El Pan, near the Colombian-Ecuadorian border, where Ecuadorian military personnel patrolling the area received an attack of gunfire coming from some homes. The shots were fired from a rifle against the patrol that was transporting the soldiers and then they received a burst of mortars. As a result of the shooting, two soldiers received minor injuries from flying shrapnel. On that same day, at approximately 9:30 in the morning, a second incident was also recorded through a detonation of a homemade explosive in a patrol car belonging to the UPC Alto Tambo in the El Pan parish, in the San Lorenzo canton.

== Attack in Mataje ==
On Tuesday, March 20, 2018, there was a detonation of an explosive device placed on the San Lorenzo-Mataje highway, where military vehicles with Army troops were passing with the aim of continuing with the operations to control the situation.

== Kidnapping and murders of journalists from the newspaper El Comercio ==
Slogan of the media and citizen campaign that demanded the release of the El Comercio staff kidnapped by the Oliver Sinisterra Front.

On March 26, 2018, three workers from the newspaper El Comercio r, were kidnapped. They were 32-year-old journalist Javier Ortega, 46-year-old photographer Paúl Rivas and 60-year-old driver Efraín Segarra. The team was working on reports about the violence that had occurred weeks before in that area.

The kidnapping occurred after passing the last military checkpoint in the town of Mataje, in Esmeraldas, a province in the region of the Colombia–Ecuador border.

On April 3, the Colombian network RCN broadcast a video of the three kidnapped Ecuadorians, in which journalist Javier Ortega said:

"Mr. President Lenín Moreno our lives are in your hands. The only thing they want is the exchange of their three detainees in Ecuador for our three lives to return safely to their families and, also the annulment of the terrorism agreement between Ecuador and Colombia.".

The video also mentioned that the perpetrators of the kidnapping was the group called the Oliver Sinisterra Front, led by the Ecuadorian Alias Guacho, a dissident of the demobilized Colombian FARC guerillas.

On April 12, the RCN network received photographs of what were presumed to be the bodies of the three kidnapped people. At first, the government authorities and the Ecuadorian president did not confirm the veracity of the photographs, giving them a period of 12 hours to provide evidence that the three captives were still alive.

On April 13, President Moreno confirmed the murder of the three Ecuadorians and announced a military operation against illegal groups in the border area with Colombia. Likewise, as a result of these events, the Ecuadorian president ordered the suspension of the peace talks in Quito between the Colombian government and the ELN guerrilla that were taking place in this country, also withdrawing as guarantor of the process. The bodies of the journalistic group were recovered in Ecuador on the Fuerza Pública de Colombia. On June 21, their identities were confirmed. For its part, the Ecuadorian government sent a note of protest to the Colombian government for the handling of information on Social media, bypassing the respective diplomatic channel.

== Kidnapping and murders of a couple on the border ==
Shortly after the murder of the journalists, the National Secretariat of Communication of Ecuador issued a statement on Twitter in which it declared that two more people had been kidnapped. The couple were Ecuadorian nationals Oscar Efrén Villacís Gómez and Katty Vanesa Velasco Pinargote. This occurred in the midst of joint military operations carried out by Ecuador and Colombia following the murder of the two journalists and their driver. President Lenin Moreno had given a statement on Monday declaring a period of 10 days to surrender and Ecuador put a reward of US$100,000 and calling the kidnappers "cowards because they use human shields to want to blackmail the Ecuadorian people." This was shocking because even during the most severe parts of the Colombian conflict, Ecuador had remained almost immune to the violence occurring on the other side of its northern border. On July 4, the Colombian Government confirmed that the two bodies found in the city of Tumaco, in the southwest of the country, later identified as the two kidnapped Ecuadorian citizens. Following this military operations in the border area were strengthened. Paradoxically, it was the signing of the peace agreements in Colombia in 2016 that seems to have changed the situation.

== Injured victims ==
The first injured victims were recorded on January 7, 2018, after the first attack in San Lorenzo, where 28 people were affected, 14 of them being police officers who were in the police building. The injuries were minor and the vast majority were treated at the Divina Providencia Hospital and the San Lorenzo health center.

== See also ==
- 2018 in Ecuador
- Ecuadorian security crisis
