= 2018 in Ecuador =

- Decades: 1990s; 2000s; 2010s; 2020s
- See also: Other events of 2018; Timeline of Ecuadorian history

Events in the year 2018 in Ecuador.

== Incumbents ==
- President: Lenín Moreno
- Vice President: Jorge Glas (until 3 January); María Alejandra Vicuña (from 3 January until 4 December); Otto Sonnenholzner (from 11 December)

== Events ==
2018 attacks on the northern border of Ecuador

- 4 February – the Ecuadorian referendum and popular consultation, 2018

=== Sports ===
- 9 to 25 February – Ecuador participated at the 2018 Winter Olympics in PyeongChang, South Korea

== Deaths ==
- 26 January – José Gabriel Diaz Cueva, Roman Catholic bishop (b. 1925).
- 22 February – Euler Granda, poet and psychiatrist (b. 1935)
- 19 March – Nicolás Kingman Riofrío, journalist, writer and politician (b. 1918)
- 19 June – Ángel Medardo Luzuriaga, musician (b. 1935).
