= 2021 in Ecuador =

- Decades: 2000s; 2010s; 2020s
- See also: Other events of 2021; Timeline of Ecuadorian history

Events in the year 2021 in Ecuador.

== Incumbents ==
- President: Lenín Moreno (until 24 May), Guillermo Lasso (from 24 May)
- Vice President: María Alejandra Muñoz (until 24 May), Alfredo Borrero (from 24 May)

== Events ==
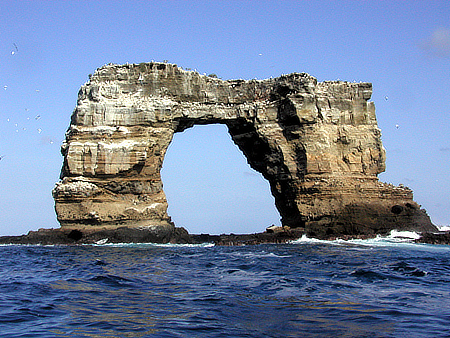
Darwin's Arch before its collapse in 2021

Ongoing — COVID-19 pandemic in Ecuador

- January 25 – BNP Paribas, Credit Suisse, and ING Group end financing for oil trading in the Amazon region of Ecuador.
- January 30 – The presidential airplane with Lenín Moreno and other high-ranking official on-board was delayed for emergency repairs as it took off from the airport in Washington, D.C. The officials had been in the United States since January 24; the trip had originally been planned for early January but was postponed due to political instability in the U.S.
- February 7 – 2021 Ecuadorian general election.
- February 11 – Groups of indigenous people mobilize in Quito in support of the presidential candidate Yaku Pérez and call for a recount. Economist Andrés Arauz is in first place with 32.64%, right-wing banker Guillermo Lasso has obtained 19.70%, and left-wing environmental lawyer Pérez has 19.46% of the votes counted. Early results showed Arauz and Pérez in first and second place, respectively.
- February 13 – Presidential candidates agree to 100% recount of votes in Guayas Province and a 50% recount in 16 other provinces.
- February 21 – The Consejo Nacional Electoral (CNE) declares that Andrés Arauz of the Unión por la Esperanza alliance had 3,033,753 votes (32.72%) and Guillermo Lasso of Creando Oportunidades (CREO), had 1,830,045 votes (19,74%) in the recent election. Yaku Pérez of Pachakutik was in third place with 1,797,445 votes (19,39%).
- February 23 – Riots in four prisons leave 79 dead and dozens wounded.
- February 27 – Health Minister Juan Carlos Zevallos resigns.
- March 1 – Rodolfo Farfán, 63, a surgeon, is named Health Minister.
- March 5 – Minister of the Interior Patricio Pazmiño resigns following the February 23 prison riots.
- March 10 – Ecuador condemns Argentine President Alberto Fernández's statements about Lenín Moreno as interference in their affairs. When asked about his relationship with vice president Cristina Kirchner, Fernandez replied, “Yo no soy Lenín Moreno. Los que imaginaron eso no me conocen” (“I am not Lenín Moreno. Those who imagine otherwise do not know me").
- March 28 – Customs officials decommission 185 baby Galápagos tortoises being sent to the mainland.
- April 11 – Second round of the presidential election
- May 17 – The rock formation Darwin's Arch in the Galápagos Islands collapses due to natural erosion.
- September 28 – 118 inmates are killed during a riot in Guayaquil, the deadliest prison violence in the country's history.
- November 13 – November 2021 Guayaquil prison riot

== Deaths ==
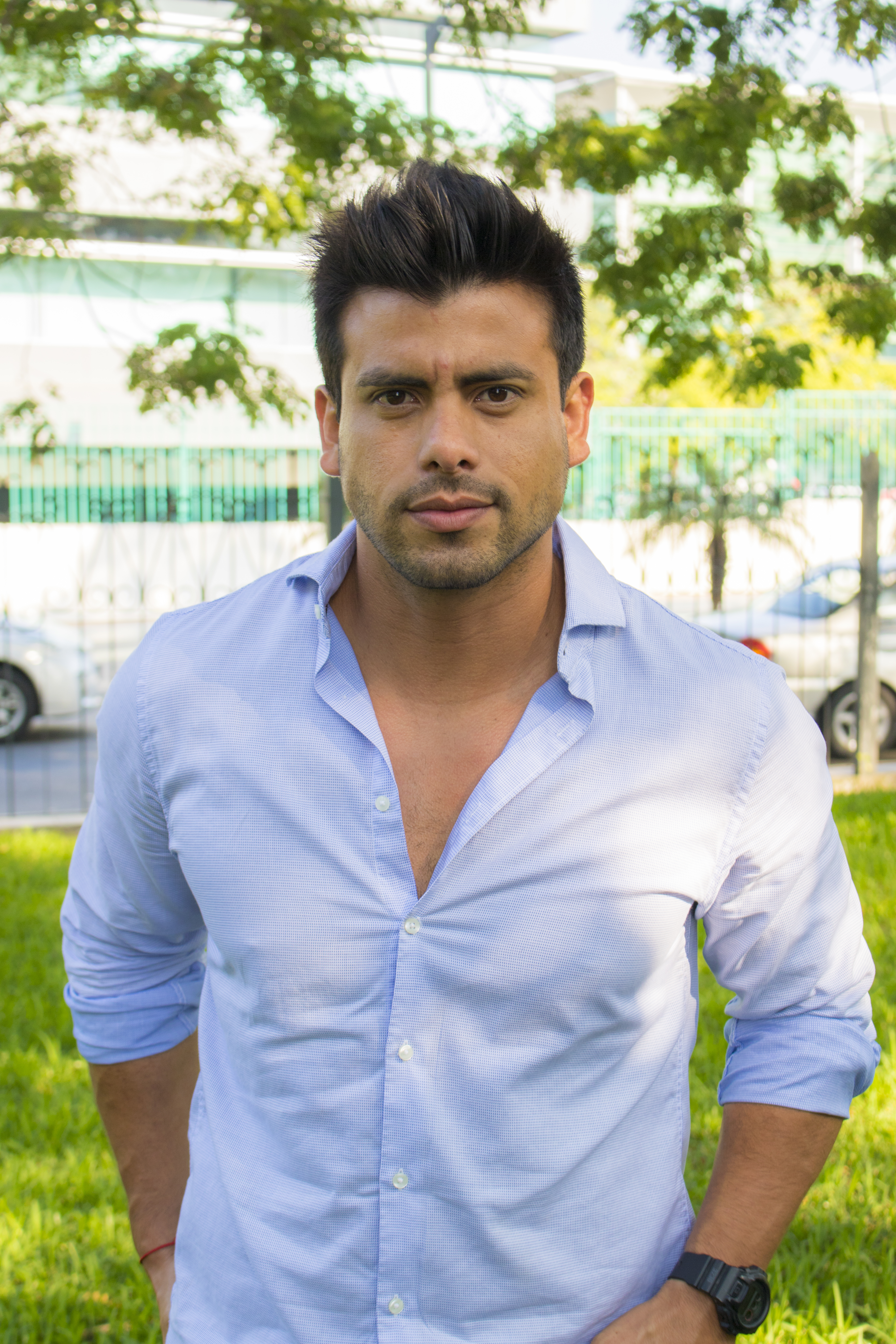
Efraín Ruales

- 10 January – Paco Álvarez Moreira, radio personality and journalist (born 1954).
- 25 January
  - Chico Borja, 61, Ecuadorian-American soccer player (New York Cosmos, Wichita Wings, U.S. national team) and manager; colon cancer.
  - Enrique Tábara, 90, painter; heart attack.
- 27 January – Efraín Ruales, 36, television actor and presenter; shot.
- 3 February – Miguel Camino Solórzano, 64, rector and educator; COVID-19.
- 16 February – Gustavo Noboa, 83, President (2000–2003) and Vice President (1998–2000), Governor of Guayas Province (1983–1984); heart attack.
- 9 March – Jhon Jarrín, 59, Olympic cyclist (1980); traffic collision.
- 10 March – Alberto Sánchez Varas, 74, sports journalist and historian.
- 4 April – Roberto Calero, 77, bolero singer; kidney disease.
