= Erick Castillo =

Ecuadorian footballer (born 1995)

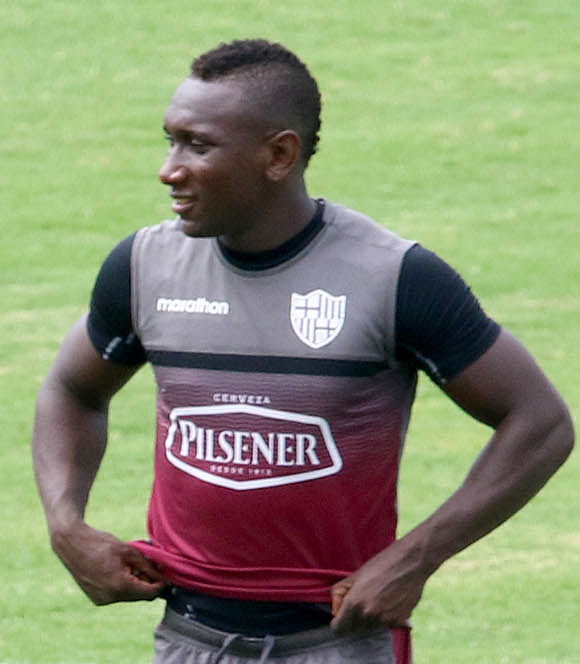
- Castillo in 2018

Personal information
- Full name: Erick Leonel Castillo Arroyo
- Date of birth: 5 February 1995 (age 31)
- Place of birth: Eloy Alfaro, Ecuador
- Height: 1.77 m (5 ft 10 in)
- Position: Winger

Team information
- Current team: Alianza Lima
- Number: 8

Youth career
- 2011–2013: Independiente del Valle

Senior career*
Years	Team	Apps	(Gls)
2013–2014	Norte América	0	(0)
2013	→ LDU Loja (loan)	28	(1)
2014–2018	Barcelona SC	90	(13)
2014	→ Olmedo (loan)	29	(0)
2019–2022	Tijuana	36	(3)
2019–2020	→ Santos Laguna (loan)	28	(4)
2020–2021	→ Juárez (loan)	21	(2)
2022	→ Barcelona SC (loan)	20	(1)
2023	Aucas	23	(3)
2024	Vitória	14	(1)
2024	Coritiba	6	(0)
2025–	Alianza Lima	27	(6)

International career^{‡}
2019–	Ecuador	4	(1)
- * Club domestic league appearances and goals as of 29 December 2025 ‡ National team caps and goals as of 13 October 2019

Erick Leonel Castillo Arroyo, better known as "La Culebra" (born 5 February 1995) is an Ecuadorian professional footballer who plays as a winger for Peruvian club Alianza Lima and the Ecuador national team.

== Club career ==
Born in Eloy Alfaro, Esmeraldas, Castillo joined Independiente del Valle's youth setup in 2011. After failing to make his breakthrough, he signed a contract with Norte América and subsequently signed for LDU Loja on loan.

Castillo made his professional debut on 29 March 2013, starting in a 2–1 away loss against Emelec. His first goal came on 25 August, the opener in a 3–1 home win against Barcelona.

On 7 January 2014 Castillo joined Barcelona, but was subsequently loaned to Olmedo for one year. He was converted into a left back during the campaign, as his side suffered relegation.

Back to Barcelona, Castillo mainly featured as a substitute during his first two seasons. On 26 February 2017, he scored a brace in a 3–2 home win against El Nacional.

== International career ==
On 5 September 2019 Castillo made his debut appearance for Ecuador against Peru, where he scored the only goal in a 1–0 win.

== Career statistics ==
As of 11 February 2026.

Club	Division	Season	League		Cup		Continental		Other		Total	
Club	Division	Season	Apps	Goals	Apps	Goals	Apps	Goals	Apps	Goals	Apps	Goals
Independiente del Valle	Serie A	2012	0	0	—		—		—		0	0
LDU Loja	Serie A	2013	28	1	—		4	0	—		32	1
Olmedo	Serie A	2014	29	0	—		—		—		29	0
Barcelona SC	Serie A	2015	10	1	—		—		—		10	1
Barcelona SC	Serie A	2016	32	2	—		2	0	—		34	2
Barcelona SC	Serie A	2017	28	5	—		9	0	—		37	5
Barcelona SC	Serie A	2018	20	5	—		2	0	—		22	5
Tijuana	Liga MX	2018-19	24	2	6	2	—		—		30	4
Santos Laguna	Liga MX	2019-20	28	4	5	0	—		—		33	4
Juárez	Liga MX	2020-21	21	2	—		—		—		21	2
Tijuana	Liga MX	2021-22	12	1	—		—		—		12	1
Barcelona SC	Serie A	2022	20	1	1	0	10	1	—		31	2
Barcelona SC	Total		110	14	1	0	23	1	0	0	134	15
Aucas	Serie A	2023	23	3	1	0	6	2	—		30	5
Vitória	Campeonato Brasileiro Série A	2024	9	1	—		—		8	0	17	1
Coritiba	Campeonato Brasileiro Série B	2024	6	0	—		—		—		6	0
Alianza Lima	Liga 1	2025	27	6	—		18	6	—		45	12
Alianza Lima	Liga 1	2026	2	1	—		2	0	—		4	1
Alianza Lima	Total		29	7	0	0	20	6	0	0	49	13
Career total			319	35	13	2	53	9	8	0	393	46

=== International goals ===
Scores and results list Ecuador's goal tally first.

No.	Date	Venue	Opponent	Score	Result	Competition
1.	5 September 2019	Red Bull Arena, Harrison, United States	Peru	1–0	1–0	Friendly

== Honours ==
Barcelona

- Ecuadorian Serie A: 2016

Vitória

- Campeonato Baiano: 2024
