= 2022 in Ecuador =

- Decades: 2000s; 2010s; 2020s
- See also: Other events of 2022; Timeline of Ecuadorian history

Events in the year 2022 in Ecuador.

== Incumbents ==
- President: Guillermo Lasso
- Vice President: Alfredo Borrero

== Events ==
- 31 January — 1 February - 2022 Ecuador landslides
- 2 March – Ecuador voted on a United Nations resolution condemning Russia for its invasion of Ukraine.
- 3 April, 9 May, 18 July, 3 October and 18 November - 2022 Ecuador prison riots

== Sport ==
- Ecuador at the 2022 Winter Olympics

== Deaths ==
- 31 January – Isabel Robalino, lawyer and politician (b. 1917)
- 1 February – Wilfrido Lucero, politician (b. 1935)
- 19 February – Álvaro Manzano, conductor (b. 1955)
- 18 April – Pedro Pinto Rubianes, politician (b. 1931)
- 12 May –Richard Moran Reyes (b. 1991)
- 21 May – Tania Tinoco, journalist, author, and television producer (b. 1963)
- 13 June – Franklin Anangonó, footballer and manager (b. 1974)
- 2 July – Francisco Huerta Montalvo, doctor and politician (b. 1940)
