= 2015 in Ecuador =

- Decades: 1990s; 2000s; 2010s; 2020s
- See also: Other events of 2015; Timeline of Ecuadorian history

Events in the year 2015 in Ecuador.

== Incumbents ==
- President: Rafael Correa
- Vice President: Jorge Glas

== Events ==
- January 10 - Death of Catherine Cando, Ecuadorian beauty queen who died from a free plastic surgery operation.
- May 30-31 - The 2015 South American Junior Championships in Athletics are held in Cuenca.
- June 8 - 2015 Ecuadorian protests: Public protests escalate against the government of Rafael Correa.

== Sports ==
- 2015 Ecuador Open Quito
- Ecuador at the 2015 World Championships in Athletics

== Deaths ==
- December 21 – Richelieu Levoyer, 85, military commander and politician
