= 2017 in Ecuador =

- Decades: 1990s; 2000s; 2010s; 2020s
- See also: Other events of 2017; Timeline of Ecuadorian history

Events in the year 2017 in Ecuador.

== Incumbents ==
- President: Rafael Correa (until 24 May); Lenín Moreno (from 24 May)
- Vice President: Jorge Glas

== Events ==
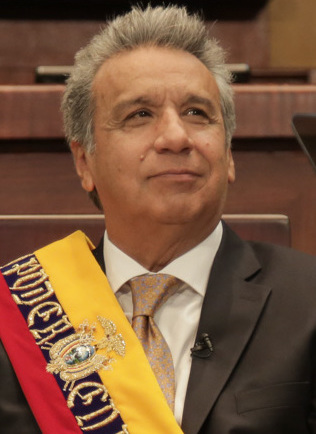
Lenín Moreno, new president of Ecuador from 27 May

- 19 February – The Ecuadorian general election was held alongside a referendum on tax havens. In the first round of the presidential elections, PAIS Alliance candidate Lenín Moreno received 39% of the vote, while his nearest rival was Guillermo Lasso of the Creating Opportunities party, and a second election round was required.
- 2 April – In the second round of the presidential election, Lenín Moreno was elected President with 51.16% of the vote.
- 24 May – Lenín Moreno took over as the new president of Ecuador.

== Deaths ==
- 7 January – Luis Alberto Luna Tobar, Roman Catholic prelate, archbishop (b. 1923).
