= 2016 in Ecuador =

- Decades: 1990s; 2000s; 2010s; 2020s
- See also: Other events of 2016; Timeline of Ecuadorian history

Events in the year 2016 in Ecuador.

== Incumbents ==
- President: Rafael Correa
- Vice President: Jorge Glas

== Events ==
- 15 March – the 2016 Ecuadorian Army Arava crash (22 fatalities)
- 16 April – an earthquake with a moment magnitude of 7.8 struck Ecuador near the towns of Muisne and Pedernales, killing more than 650 people.

=== Sport ===
- 5-21 August – Ecuador at the 2016 Summer Olympics: 38 competitors in 13 sports

== Deaths ==
- 1 March – Ítalo Estupiñán, footballer (b. 1952).
- 7 May – Gonzalo López Marañon, Roman Catholic bishop (b. 1933).
- 2 August – Álvaro Pérez Intriago, politician (b. 1936).
