= 2019 in Ecuador =

- Decades: 1990s; 2000s; 2010s; 2020s
- See also: Other events of 2019; Timeline of Ecuadorian history

Events in the year 2019 in Ecuador.

== Incumbents ==
- President of Ecuador - Lenín Moreno
- Vice President of Ecuador - Otto Sonnenholzner

== Events ==
- 13 June - The Supreme Court of Ecuador votes to legalize same-sex marriage
- 2019 Ecuadorian protests

== See also ==
- 2019 Pan American Games

== Links ==
- Media related to 2019 in Ecuador at Wikimedia Commons
