= Walter Patricio "Guacho" Arízala Vernaza =

Ecuadorian rebel leader and drug lord

- Born: 9 November 1989; Valdez, Esmeraldas, Ecuador
- Died: 21 December 2018 (aged 29); Tumaco, Colombia
- Military career
- Allegiance: Revolutionary Armed Forces of Colombia
- Unit: 29th Front

Walter Patricio Arízala Vernaza, also known as William Quiñonez or Luis Alfredo Pai Jiménez, (9 November 1989 – 21 December 2018), better known by his nom de guerre Alias Guacho was an Ecuadorian, member of Revolutionary Armed Forces of Colombia (FARC), after 2016 peace agreement became a FARC dissident.

== Life ==
A native of Valdez, Esmeraldas, Ecuador, Arízala joined the Revolutionary Armed Forces of Colombia (FARC) in 2007. He became known by the aliases Guacho and William Quiñónez.

Arízala led FARC's 29th Front. He participated in the peace process between FARC and the Colombian government, but broke away in 2017, choosing not to acknowledge a ceasefire brokered in June 2016. Subsequently, the 29th Front was renamed the Oliver Sinisterra Front. Arízala's faction was based in Nariño Department, where it often engaged with the United Guerrillas of the Pacific, led by another FARC dissident. Under his leadership, the Oliver Sinisterra Front captured and killed two journalists and their driver in April 2018, and separately held an Ecuadorian man and woman. The governments of Colombia and Ecuador both offered rewards of $100,000 for information resulting in Arízala's capture.

Arízala died at the age of 29 on 21 December 2018 in a joint military and police operation launched by Colombia and Ecuador near Tumaco, Colombia.
