= Ancón de Sardinas =

Bay in Colombia and Ecuador

- Location within Colombia
- Location: Colombia–Ecuador border
- Coordinates: 1°28′1″N 78°58′48″W
- Ocean/sea sources: Pacific Ocean
- Basin countries: Colombia, Ecuador

Ancón de Sardinas ('Sardinas Bight') is a bight in the Pacific Ocean, located on the border between Colombia, which is to the north (Nariño Department), and Ecuador, which is to the south (Esmeraldas Province). In this place begins the maritime delimitation of the border between Colombia and Ecuador, which consists of a single treaty signed on August 23, 1975 and, from the intersection of the extension of the land border and the confluence of the territorial areas of both countries, a midpoint is marked in the bay; From here to the Mataje River, which flows into it, a line is drawn that terminates the boundary.
