= Valdez, Esmeraldas =

Valdéz
- Town
- Location within Ecuador
- Coordinates: 1°15′0″N 79°0′0″W
- Country: Ecuador
- Province: Esmeraldas
- Canton: Eloy Alfaro

Area
  - Town: 1.8 km^{2} (0.69 sq mi)

Population (2022 census)
  - Town: 4,956
  - Density: 2,800/km^{2} (7,100/sq mi)
- Climate: Am

Valdéz (frequently also called Limones) is a town in the Esmeraldas province of Ecuador. It is the seat of the Eloy Alfaro Canton.

== Sources ==
- World-Gazetteer.com
