= Roberto Calero =

Ecuadorian singer (1943–2021)

- Also known as: "El Payador de Vinces"
- Born: Roberto Alfonso Calero Piedrahita; January 1, 1943
- Died: April 4, 2021 (aged 78)
- Genres: Bolero
- Occupation: Singer
- Formerly of: Alci Acosta; Rodolfo Aicardi

Roberto Alfonso Calero Piedrahita (January 1, 1943 – April 4, 2021) was an Ecuadorian bolero singer.

== Biography ==
He was born in 1943 in Vinces, Los Ríos Province. He started his musical career when he was still studying at school. In 1965 he was first in the Interprovincial Festival of Amateur Singers held in Quevedo, representing the city of Vinces; this had him invited to sing in the program La Sorpresa Radia of radio Cristal de Guayaquil where he was accepted, winning the nickname of the "Payador de Vinces". At first he recorded songs from the corridors but with the passage of time he dedicated himself to singing boleros. Throughout his musical career he managed to record 50 45 RPM records, 16 LP records and 16 compact discs. In addition to that, he toured countries such as the United States and Canada. Similarly, he had the opportunity to collaborate with singers of the bolero genre such as Alci Acosta, Rodolfo Aicardi, Tito Cortés and Pedrito Otiniano.

== Death ==
He died in Guayaquil, Guayas, Ecuador, on April 4, 2021, at the age of 78, from kidney disease.
