= Mataje River =

River of Ecuador and Colombia

Location
- Countries: Colombia; Ecuador

Physical characteristics
- Mouth
  - coordinates: 1°26′24″N 78°49′23″W

The Mataje River is a South American river belonging to the Pacific slope and that for approximately half of its route is the border between Colombia and Ecuador.

The river flows into the bay of Ancón de Sardinas, point where the maritime border between Colombia and Ecuador begins.
