= Colombia–Ecuador border =

International border

Coordinates: 0.9028°S 75.2917°W

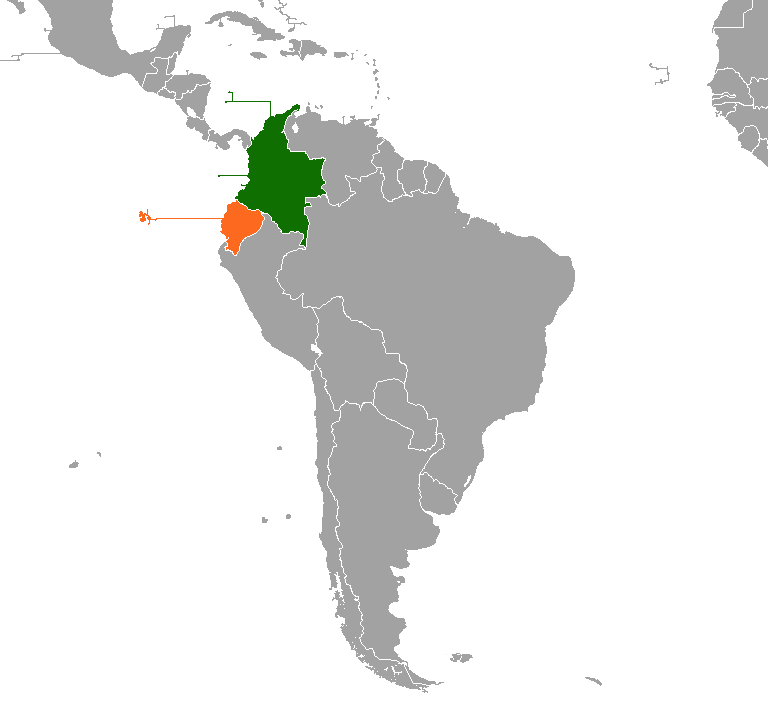
Locator map

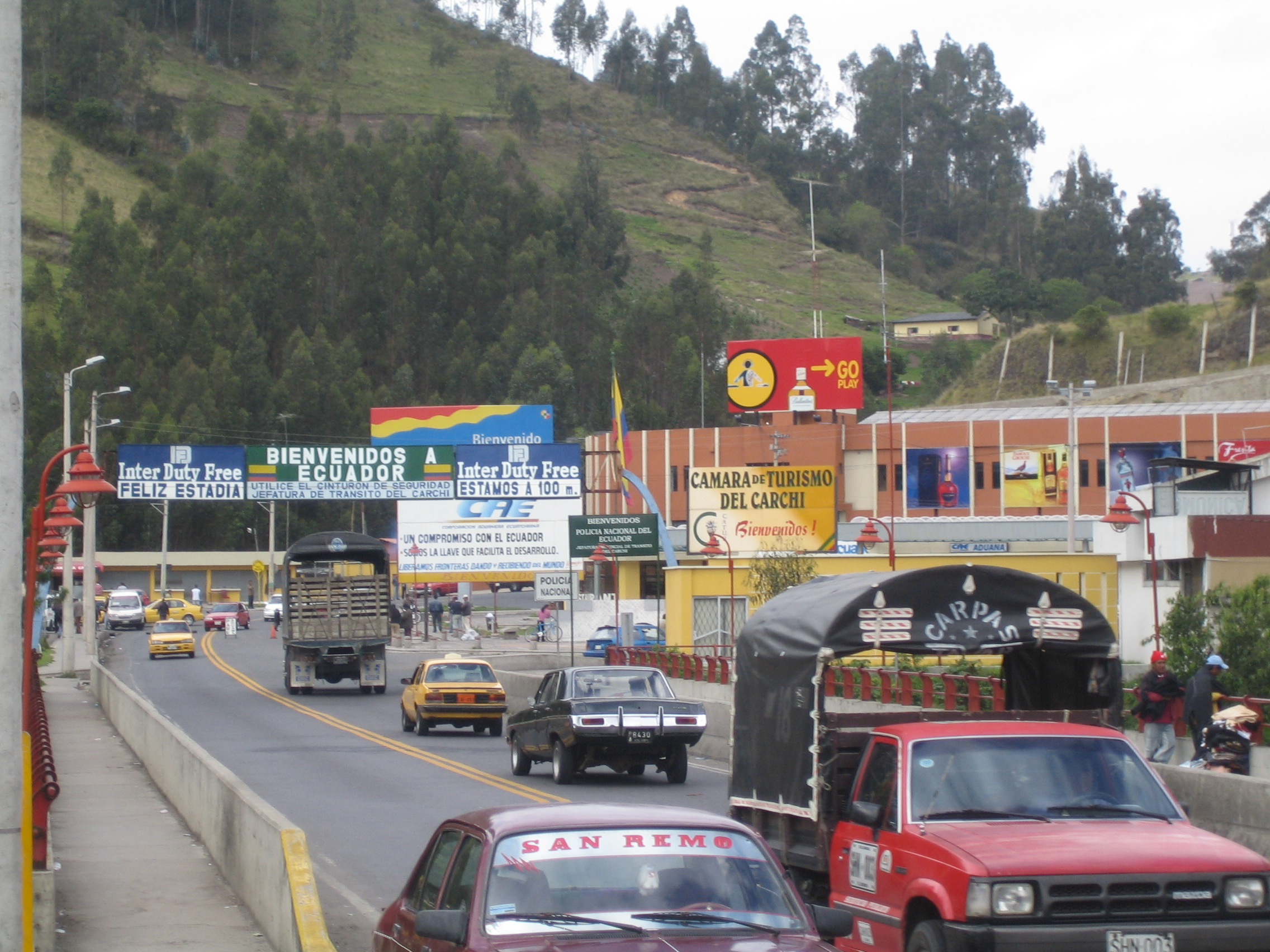
Rumichaca International Bridge, between the cities of Tulcán, Ecuador and Ipiales, Colombia.

The Colombia–Ecuador border is an international boundary between the territories of Colombia and Ecuador. It consists of two sections, one terrestrial and one marine, well-defined:

The first section is a continuous line of 586 kilometres, running from east to west (from the Güepí River to the mouth of the Mataje River in Ancón de Sardinas Bay in the Pacific Ocean). It is about 28% of what was once the border between Colombia and Ecuador after the disintegration of Gran Colombia in 1830. The current land border was demarcated permanently by Muñoz-Suárez Vernaza Treaty on 15 July 1916. The second tranche starts at the end point of the land boundary and runs 200 nautical miles offshore, as expressed in the law of the sea. This part was demarcated by the Liévano-Lucio Treaty August 23, 1975.

== History ==
During the Ecuadorian conflict (2024–present), there have been military strikes on drug trafficking groups such as the Comandos de la Frontera, a group of FARC dissidents by both the Ecuadorian and United States military. In addition in March 2026, a Narco-submarine was discovered and destroyed in a mangrove swamp in the Cayapas–Mataje nature reserve near the Northern border, with a drug smuggling camp located nearby. That same month, the burned remains of 27 individuals and an unexploded bomb were located on the Colombian side of the border, promoting reciprocal accusations of attacks by Ecuador on Colombia from Colombia's government, and border neglect by the Colombian government from the perspective of the Ecuadorian government.

== See also ==
- Ecuador–Peru border
