= 2018 Ecuadorian referendum and popular consultation =

2018 Ecuadorian referendum

Ecuadorian referendum and popular consultation, 2018
February 4, 2018

Referendum
1. Yes	73.71%
1. No	26.29%
2. Yes	64.20%
2. No	35.80%

2018 Ecuadorian referendum and popular consultation
Results
3. Yes	63.08%
3. No	36.92%
4. Yes	73.53%
4. No	26.47%

2018 Ecuadorian referendum and popular consultation
Results
5. Yes	68.62%
5. No	31.38%
6. Yes	63.10%
6. No	36.90%

2018 Ecuadorian referendum and popular consultation
Results
7. Yes	67.31%
7. No	32.69%

A seven-part referendum and popular consultation was held in Ecuador on Sunday, February 4, 2018, to reform the constitution and consult citizens on issues of national importance. The consultation was announced on October 2, 2017, by President Lenin Moreno. The ballot consisted of seven questions for voters to approve or reject.

== Background ==
On the night of September 4, 2017, President Moreno made the first announcement about the Popular Consultation, where he indicated that the possibility of calling it was under analysis. Two weeks later, on September 18, 2017, the president summoned citizens interested in sending questions for analysis and possible incorporation to the consultation.

President Moreno, without approval of the Constitutional Court, made an executive decree to allow the Popular Consultation. When in 2015, Rafael Correa urged the CNE to execute the Popular Consultation in La Manga del Cura in 2015, he had previously been directed by the Constitutional Court on June 24 to issue the executive decree to hold the plebiscite.

== Quotes ==
=== Referendum ===
Question 1
English	Do you agree that the Constitution be amended to sanction any person convicted of acts of corruption with their inability to participate in political life and with the loss of their property, as stated in Annex 1?
Spanish	¿Está usted de acuerdo con que se enmiende la Constitución para que se sancione a toda persona condenada por actos de corrupción con su inhabilitación para participar en la vida política y con la pérdida de sus bienes, como dice el Anexo 1?

Question 2
English	To guarantee the principle of alternation, do you agree to amend the Constitution of the Republic of Ecuador so that all the authorities of popular election can be re-elected once for the same office, recovering the mandate of the Constitution of Montecristi and leaving without effect the indefinite re-election approved by amendment by the National Assembly on December 3, 2015, as established in Annex 2?
Spanish	Para garantizar el principio de alternabilidad, ¿está usted de acuerdo con enmendar la Constitución de la República del Ecuador para que todas las autoridades de elección popular puedan ser reelectas por una sola vez para el mismo cargo, recuperando el mandato de la Constitución de Montecristi y dejando sin efecto la reelección indefinida aprobada mediante enmienda por la Asamblea Nacional el 3 de diciembre de 2015, según lo establecido en el Anexo 2?

Question 3
English	Do you agree to amend the Constitution of the Republic of Ecuador to restructure the Council of Citizen Participation and Social Control, as well as to terminate the constitutional term of its current members and that the Council that transitorily assumes its functions has the power to evaluate the performance of the authorities whose designation corresponds to it, being able, if the case, to anticipate the termination of their periods according to Annex 3?
Spanish	¿Está usted de acuerdo con enmendar la Constitución de la República del Ecuador para reestructurar el Consejo de Participación Ciudadana y Control Social, así como dar por terminado el periodo constitucional de sus actuales miembros y que el Consejo que asuma transitoriamente sus funciones tenga la potestad de evaluar el desempeño de las autoridades cuya designación le corresponde, pudiendo, de ser el caso, anticipar la terminación de sus períodos de acuerdo al Anexo 3?

Question 4
English	Do you agree to amend the Constitution so that sexual crimes against children and adolescents have no statute of limitations, according to Annex 4?
Spanish	¿Está usted de acuerdo con enmendar la Constitución para que nunca prescriban los delitos sexuales en contra de niñas, niños y adolescentes, según el Anexo 4?

Question 5
English	Do you agree to amend the Constitution of the Republic of Ecuador to prohibit metallic mining in all its stages, in protected areas, in intangible zones, and urban centers, according to Annex 5?
Spanish	¿Está usted de acuerdo con enmendar la Constitución de la República del Ecuador para que se prohíba la minería metálica en todas sus etapas, en áreas protegidas, en zonas intangibles, y centros urbanos, según el Anexo 5?

=== Popular consultation ===
Question 6
English	Do you agree with the repeal of the Organic Law to Prevent Speculation on the Value of Land and Speculation of Taxes, known as the Capital Gains Law, according to Annex I?
Spanish	¿Está usted de acuerdo con que se derogue la Ley Orgánica para Evitar la Especulación sobre el Valor de Tierras y Especulación de Tributos, conocida como Ley de Plusvalía, segun el Anexo I?

Question 7
English	Do you agree to increase the intangible zone by at least 50,000 hectares and reduce the area of oil exploitation authorized by the National Assembly in the Yasuní National Park from 1,030 hectares to 300 hectares?
Spanish	¿Está usted de acuerdo en incrementar la zona intangible al menos 50.000 hectáreas y reducir el área de explotación petrolera autorizada por la Asamblea Nacional en el Parque Nacional Yasuní de 1.030 hectáreas a 300 hectáreas?

== Opinion polls ==
Date	Source	Question 1		Question 2		Question 3		Question 4		Question 5		Question 6		Question 7	
Date	Source	Yes	No	Yes	No	Yes	No	Yes	No	Yes	No	Yes	No	Yes	No
12 Dec 2017	Perfiles de Opinión	74.0%	13.0%	56.0%	29.0%	61%	23.0%	74.0%	13.0%	66.0%	19.0%	62.0%	23.0%	63.0%	22.0%
6 Jan 2018	Click	80.8%	19.2%	71.1%	28.9%	72.5%	27.5%	81.1%	18.9%	70.8%	29.2%	67.1%	32.9%	68.4%	31.6%
11 Jan 2018	Diagnóstico	67.6%	32.4%	60.5%	39.5%	64.2%	35.8%	67.3%	32.7%	63.4%	36.6%	59.8%	40.2%	60.2%	39.8%
15 Jan 2018	CEDATOS	83.9%	16.1%	70.6%	29.4%	72.8%	27.2%	83.3%	16.7%	73.8%	26.2%	72.3%	27.7%	77.0%	23.0%
22 Jan 2018	Eureknow	74.0%	26.0%	69.3%	30.7%	66.1%	33.9%	82.9%	17.1%	69.8%	30.2%	66.6%	33.4%	68.0%	32.0%

== Results ==
Question	For		Against		Invalid/ blank	Total votes	Registered voters	Turnout	Result
Question	Votes	%	Votes	%	Invalid/ blank	Total votes	Registered voters	Turnout	Result
Question 1	7,036,604	73.71	2,509,773	26.29	971,984	10,518,361	13,026,598	80.75	Accepted
Question 2	6,115,590	64.20	3,410,298	35.80	989,711	10,515,599	13,026,598	80.72	Accepted
Question 3	5,983,061	63.08	3,501,797	36.92	1,031,669	10,516,527	13,026,598	80.73	Accepted
Question 4	6,959,575	73.53	2,505,705	26.47	1,051,484	10,516,764	13,026,598	80.73	Accepted
Question 5	6,486,181	68.62	2,966,583	31.38	1,064,706	10,517,470	13,026,598	80.74	Accepted
Question 6	5,966,923	63.10	3,489,513	36.90	1,060,474	10,516,910	13,026,598	80.73	Accepted
Question 7	6,337,768	67.31	3,077,785	32.69	1,102,221	10,517,774	13,026,598	80.74	Accepted
Source: CNE
