= Eloy Alfaro Canton =

Canton Eloy Alfaro
- Canton
- Location of Esmeraldas Province in Ecuador.

- Eloy Alfaro Canton in Esmeraldas Province
- Coordinates: 1°15′0″N 79°0′0″W
- Country: Ecuador
- Province: Esmeraldas Province

Area
  - Total: 4,478 km^{2} (1,729 sq mi)

Population (2022 census)
  - Total: 46,305
  - Density: 10.34/km^{2} (26.78/sq mi)
- Time zone: UTC-5 (ECT)

Canton Eloy Alfaro is a canton of Ecuador, part of the province of Esmeraldas. Its capital is the town of Limones. Its population at the 2001 census was 33,403.

== Demographics ==
Ethnic groups as of the Ecuadorian census of 2010:

- Afro-Ecuadorian 64.1%
- Indigenous 16.8%
- Mestizo 14.6%
- White 3.4%
- Montubio 1.0%
- Other 0.2%
