= History of Ecuador =

The History of Ecuador spans from the beginning of human habitation in the region from around 8,000 BC to present.

During the Pre-Columbian era, various cultures influenced the people and land that today make up the contemporary Republic of Ecuador. Indigenous tribes inhabited the area for millennia before being invaded and absorbed into the Inca Empire in the early fifteenth century.

The Incas were conquered shortly afterwards by the Spanish led by Francisco Pizarro in the early 16th century. The region fell under the Viceroyalty of Peru, although it was granted limited autonomy through the Quito Audencia established in 1563. In 1720, it was merged with the Viceroyalty of New Granada.

A rebellion in 1812 against the Quito Audencia was crushed early in the Spanish American wars of independence, but the struggle was revived in 1820 by a new rebellion originating in Guayaquil. The city was also the site of the Guayaquil Conference between Simon Bolivar and San Martin. Ecuador became independent initially as part of the Republic of Gran Colombia, before finally breaking away in 1830.

Ecuador endured a period of civil wars post-independence to the mid nineteenth century, succeeded by the domination of caudillos, alternating between conservative and liberal. Since the twentieth century, Ecuador has struggled to achieve both economic and political stability.

== Pre-Columbian Ecuador ==
During the pre-Inca period, people lived in clans, which formed great tribes, some allied with each other to form powerful confederations, such as the Confederation of Quito. But none of these confederations could resist the formidable momentum of the Tawantinsuyu. The invasion of the Incas in the 16th century was very painful and bloody. However, once occupied by the Quito hosts of Huayna Capac (1523–1525), the Incas developed an extensive administration and began the colonization of the region. The Pre-Columbian era can be divided up into four eras: the Pre-ceramic Period, the Formative Period, the Period of Regional Development and the Period of Integration and the Arrival of the Incas.

The Pre-ceramic period begins with the end of the first ice-age and continued until 4200 BCE. The Las Vegas culture and The Inga Cultures dominated this period. The Las Vegas culture lived on the Santa Elena Peninsula on the coast of Ecuador between 9,000 and 6,000 BC. The earliest people were hunters-gatherers and fishermen. Around 6,000 BC cultures in the region were among the first to begin farming. The Ingas lived in the Sierra near present-day Quito between 9000 and 8000 BC along an ancient trade route.

Valdivia culture

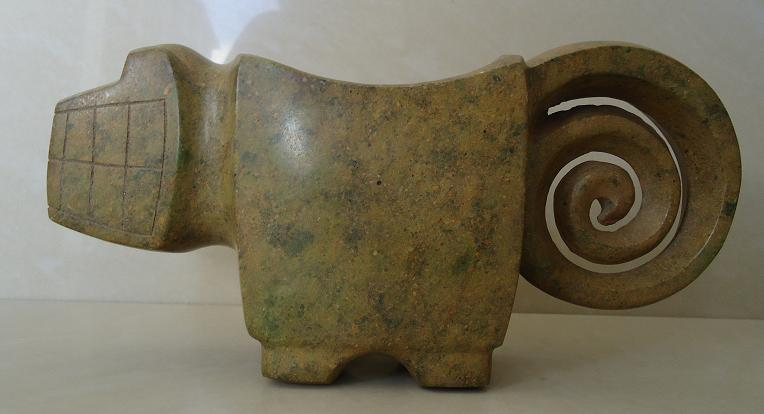
Mortar, Jaguar Valdivia, South Coast (4000 BCE to 1500 BCE).

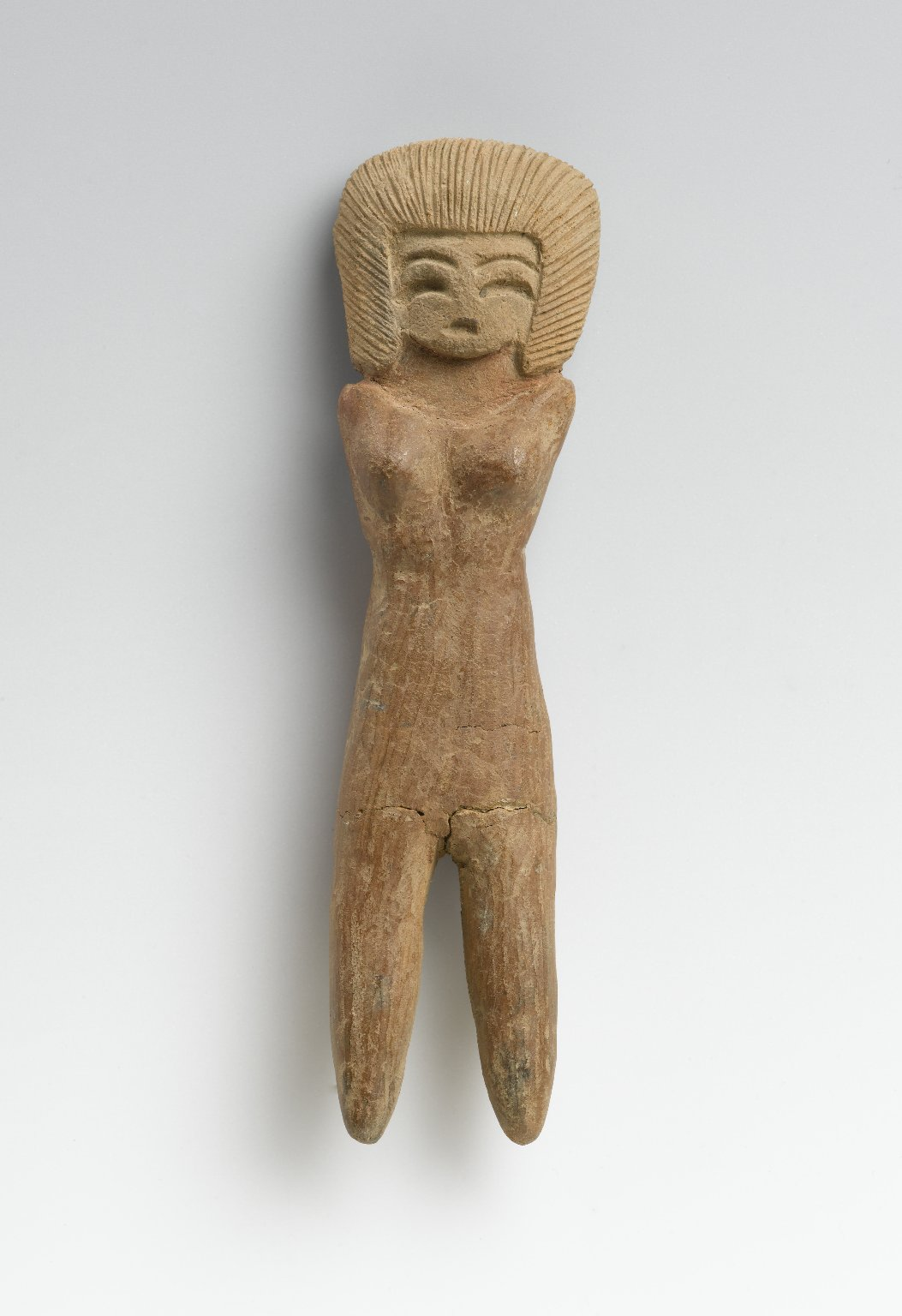
Ceramic female figurine (2600–1500 BCE).

People of the region moved from hunter-gathering and simple farming into a more developed society, with permanent developments, an increase in agriculture and the use of ceramics. New cultures included the Machalilla culture, Valdivia culture, and the Chorrera culture in the coast; Cotocollao and the Chimba in the sierra; and Pastaza and Chiguaza in the eastern region. The Valdivia culture is the first culture where significant remains have been discovered. Their civilization dates back as early as 3500 B.C. Living in the area near the Santa Elena Peninsula, they were one of the first Americans to use pottery. They navigated the seas and established a trade network with tribes in the Andes and the Amazon.

Succeeding the Valdivia, the Machalilla culture was a farming culture that thrived along the coast of Ecuador between the 2nd and 1st millennia BC. These appear to be the earliest people to cultivate maize in this part of South America. Existing in the late formative period the Chorrera culture lived in the Andes and Coastal Regions of Ecuador between 1000 and 300 BC.

=== Period of Regional Development ===
The period of Regional Development is identified by the emergence of regional differences in territorial or political and social organization. Among the main cultures of this period were the Jambelí, Guangala, Bahia, Tejar-Daule, La Tolita, Jama Coaque on the coast, Cerro Narrío Alausí in the sierras, and Tayos in the Ecuadorian Amazon jungle.

La Chimba, north of Quito, is the site of the earliest ceramics found in the northern Andes and is representative of the Formative Period in its final stage. Its inhabitants were in contact with villages on the coast and the mountains, in close proximity to the Cotocollao culture located on the plateau of Quito and its surrounding valleys. The Bahia culture occupied the area that stretches from the foothills of the Andes to the Pacific Ocean, and from Bahía de Caráquez to the south of Manabi. The Jama-Coaque culture inhabited areas between Cabo San Francisco in Esmeraldas and Bahía de Caráquez in Manabi, in an area of wooded hills and vast beaches which facilitated the gathering of resources from both the jungle and the ocean.

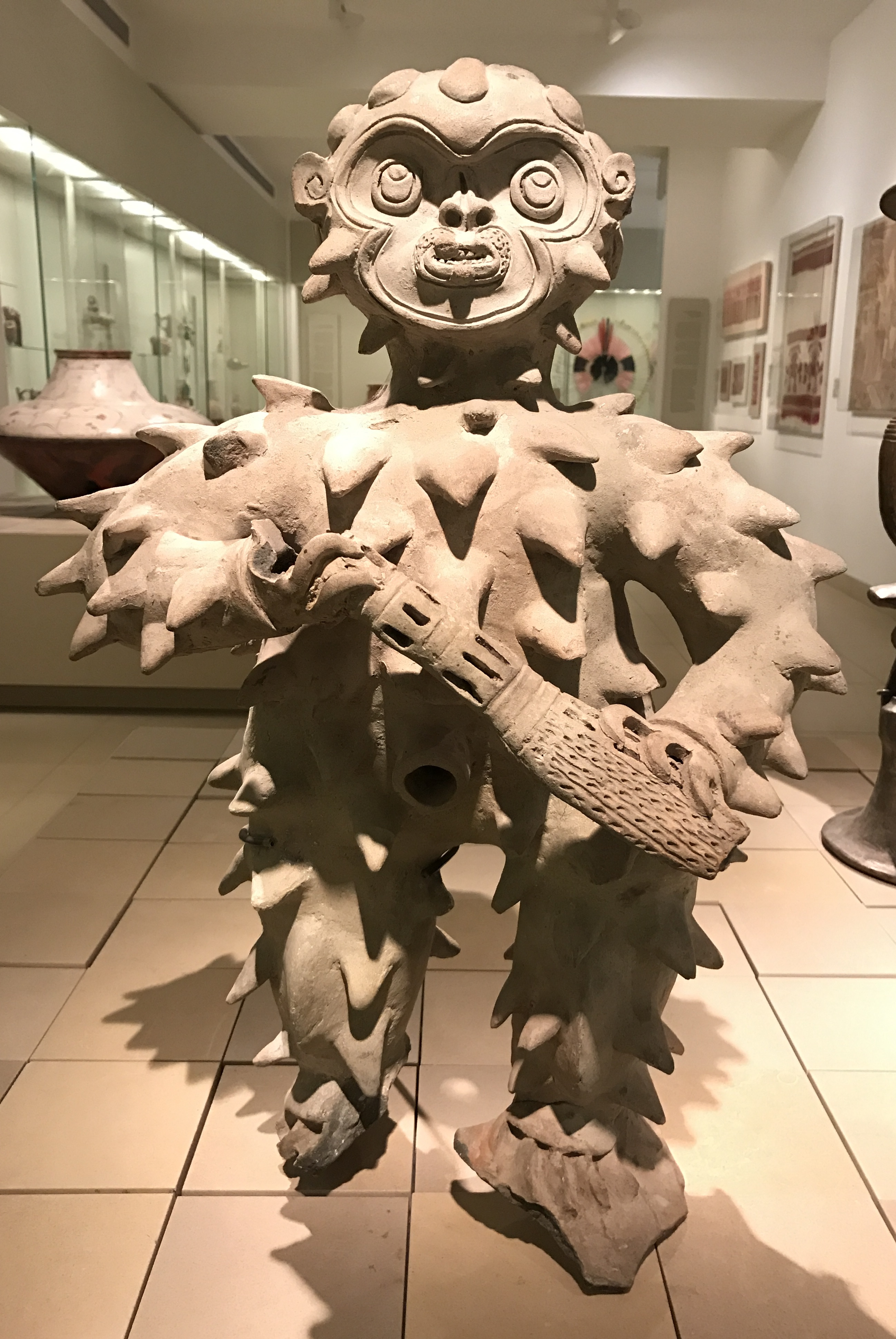
Tumaco-La Tolita mythological figure in feathered costume. Between 100 BC and 100 AD. Found in Esmeraldas.

The La Tolita developed in the coastal region of Southern Colombia and Northern Ecuador between 600 BCE and 200 AD. A Number of archaeological sites have been discovered and show the highly artistic nature of this culture. Artifacts are characterized by gold jewelry, beautiful anthropomorphous masks and figurines that reflect a hierarchical society with complex ceremonies.

=== Period of Integration and the arrival of the Inca ===
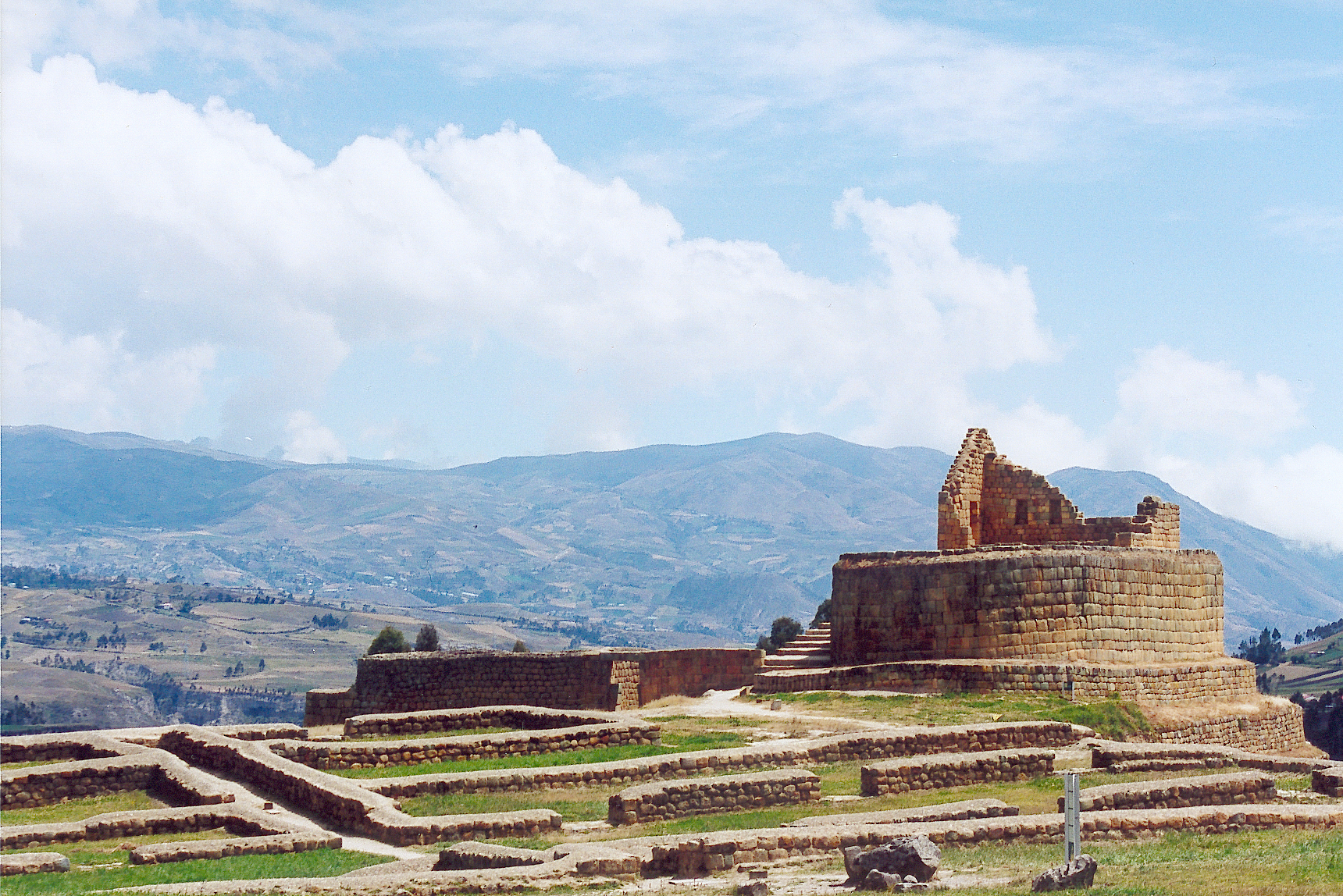
Ingapirca Ruins near Cuenca

Tribes throughout Ecuador integrated during this period. They created better housing that allowed them to improve their living conditions and no longer be subject to the climate. In the mountains Cosangua-Píllaro, the Capulí and Piartal-Tuza cultures arose, in the eastern region was the Yasuní Phase while the Milagro, Manteña and Huancavilca cultures developed on the coast.

==== The Manteños ====
The Manteños were the last of the pre-Columbian cultures in the coastal region existing between 600 and 1534. They were the first to witness the arrival of Spanish ships sailing in the surrounding Pacific Ocean. According to archaeological evidence and Spanish chronicles the civilization existed from Bahía de Caráquez to Cerro de Hojas in the south. They were excellent weavers, produced textiles, articles of gold, silver spondylus shells and mother of pearl. The manteños mastered the seas and created an extensive trade routes as far as Chile to the south and Western Mexico to the north. The center of the culture was in the area of Manta which was named in their honor.

==== The Huancavilcas ====
The Huancavilcas constitute the most important pre-Columbian culture of Guayas. These warriors were noted for their appearance. Huancavilca of culture is the legend of Guayas and Quiles, which gives its name to the city of Guayaquil.

==== The Incas ====
Recent radiocarbon dating suggests that the Incas may have begun constructing military infrastructure in southern Ecuador as early as 1432. The Inca civilization expansion northward from modern-day Peru during the late 15th century met with fierce resistance by several Ecuadorian tribes, particularly the Cañari in the region around modern-day Cuenca along with the Quitu, occupants of the site of the modern capital; and the Cara in the Sierra north of Quito. The conquest of Ecuador began in 1463 under the leadership of the ninth Inca, the great warrior Pachacuti Inca Yupanqui. In that year, his son Tupa took over command of the army and began his march northward through the Sierra.

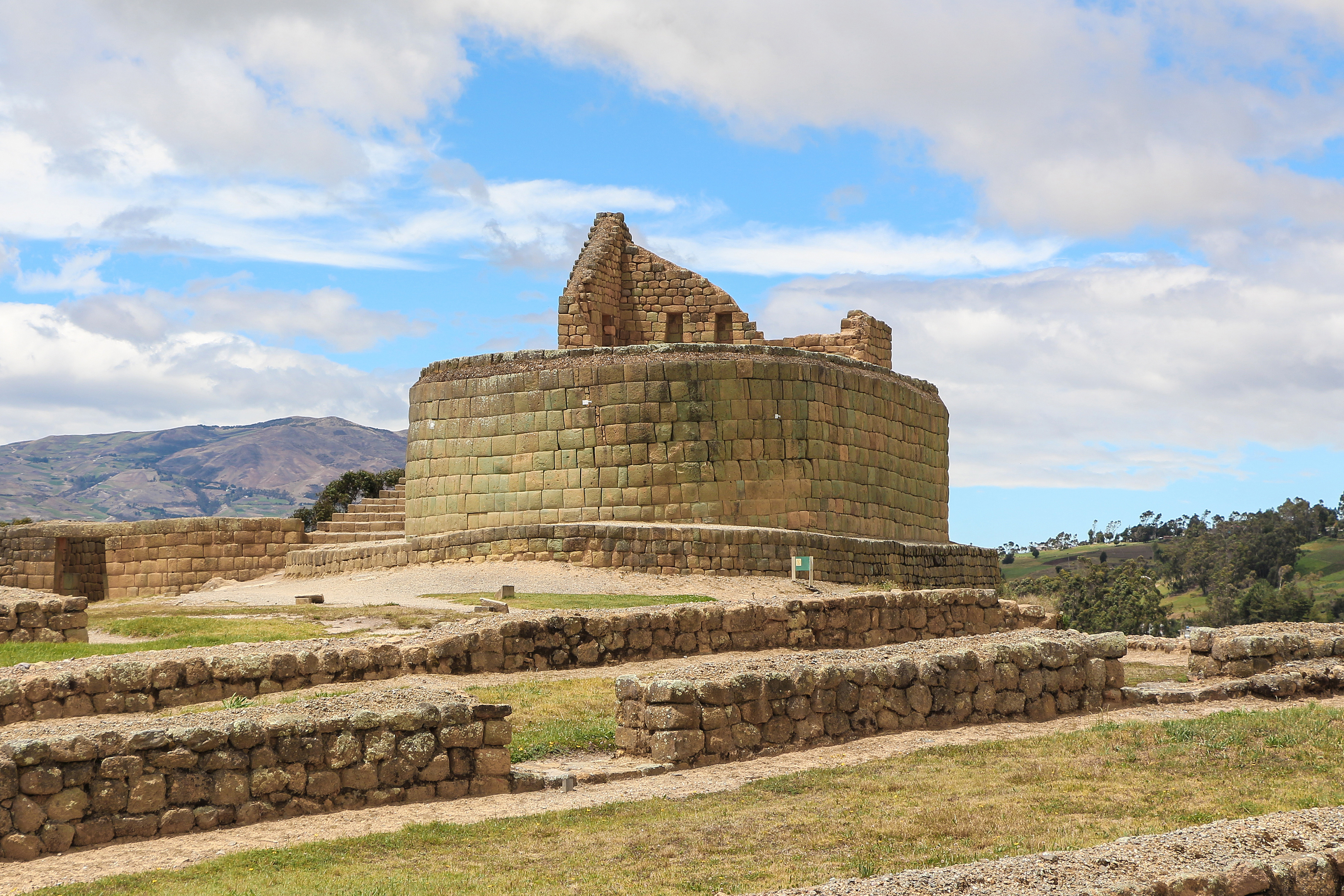
Incan ruins at Ingapirca

By 1500 Tupa's son, Huayna Capac, overcame the resistance of these populations and that of the Cara, and thus incorporated most of modern-day Ecuador into Tawantinsuyu, or the Inca empire. The influence of these conquerors based in Cuzco (modern-day Peru) was limited to about a half century, or less in some parts of Ecuador. During that period, some aspects of life remained unchanged. Traditional religious beliefs, for example, persisted throughout the period of Inca rule. In other areas, however, such as agriculture, land tenure, and social organization, Inca rule had a profound effect despite its relatively short duration.

Emperor Huayna Capac became fond of Quito, making it a secondary capital of Tawantinsuyu and living out his elder years there before his death in about 1527. He willed that his heart be buried in Quito, his favorite city, and the rest of his body be buried with his ancestors in Cuzco. Huayna Capac's sudden death and the death days later of the Incan heir apparent from a strange disease, described by one source as smallpox, precipitated a bitter power struggle between Huáscar, whose mother was Coya (Empress) Mama Rahua Occillo, and Atahualpa, whose mother was according to most sources of the panaka of Pachacuti, and who was his father's favorite. Huascar was chosen as emperor by the Inca nobles, but Atahualpa was very popular with the Inca armies stationed in the north. Huayna Capac had named another one of his sons, Ninan Cuyochi, as his heir. But Ninan Cuyochi died shortly after his father from smallpox. Huáscar ordered Atahualpa to attend their father's burial in Cuzco and pay homage to him as the new Inca ruler. Atahualpa, with a large number of his father's veteran soldiers, decided to ignore Huáscar, and a civil war ensued. A number of bloody battles took place until finally Huáscar was captured. Atahualpa marched south to Cuzco and massacred the royal family associated with his brother.

This struggle raged during the half-decade before the arrival of Francisco Pizarro's conquering expedition in 1532. The key battle of this civil war was fought on Ecuadorian soil, near Riobamba, where Huáscar's northbound troops were met and defeated by Atahualpa's southbound troops. Atahualpa's final victory over Huáscar in the days just before the Spanish conquerors arrived resulted in large part from the loyalty of two of Huayna Capac's best generals, who were based in Quito along with Atahualpa. The victory remains a source of national pride to Ecuadorians as a rare case when "Ecuador" bested a "neighboring country" by force.

== Spanish discovery and conquest ==
As the Inca Civil War raged, in 1530 the Spanish landed in Ecuador. Led by Francisco Pizarro, the conquistadors learned that the conflict and disease were destroying the empire. After receiving reinforcements in September 1532, Pizarro set out to the newly victorious Atahualpa.

Arriving at Cajamarca, Pizarro sent an embassy, led by Hernando de Soto, with 15 horsemen and an interpreter; shortly thereafter he sent 20 more horsemen led by his brother Hernando Pizarro as reinforcements in case of an Inca attack. The Incan emperor and his subjects alike were all captivated by the conquistadors' appearance and demeanour, specially due to their bearded faces, which recalled the legend of the Viracocha. In town Pizarro set a trap for the Inca and the Battle of Cajamarca began. The Inca forces greatly outnumbered the Spanish; however, the Spanish superiority of weapons and tactics and the fact that the most trusted Inca generals were in Cusco led to an easy defeat and the capture of the Incan Emperor.

During the next year Pizarro held Atahualpa for ransom. The Incas filled the Ransom Room with gold and silver awaiting a release that would never happen. On August 29, 1533, Atahualpa was garroted. The Spanish then set out to conquer the rest of Tawantinsuyu, capturing Cuzco in November 1533.

Benalcázar, Pizarro's lieutenant and fellow Extremaduran, had already departed from San Miguel with 140-foot soldiers and a few horses on his conquering mission to Ecuador. At the foot of Mount Chimborazo, near the modern city of Riobamba (Ecuador), he met and defeated the forces of the great Inca warrior Rumiñahui with the aid of Cañari tribesmen who served as guides and allies to the conquering Spaniards. Rumiñahui fell back to Quito, and, while in pursuit of the Inca army, Benalcázar encountered another, quite sizable, conquering party led by Guatemalan Governor Pedro de Alvarado. Bored with administering Central America, Alvarado had set sail for the south without the crown's authorization, landed on the Ecuadorian coast, and marched inland to the Sierra. Most of Alvarado's men joined Benalcázar for the siege of Quito. In 1533, Rumiñahui burned the city to prevent the Spanish from taking it, destroying the ancient pre-Hispanic city.

In 1534 Sebastián de Belalcázar along with Diego de Almagro established the city of San Francisco de Quito on top of the ruins of the secondary Inca capital, naming it in honor of Pizarro. It was not until December 1540 that Quito received its first captain-general in the person of Francisco Pizarro's brother, Gonzalo Pizarro.

Benalcázar had also founded the city of Guayaquil in 1533, but it had subsequently been retaken by the local Huancavilca tribesmen. Francisco de Orellana, yet another lieutenant of Francisco Pizarro from the Spanish city of Trujillo, put down the native rebellion and in 1537 reestablished this city, which a century later would become one of Spain's principal ports in South America.

== Spanish colonial era ==
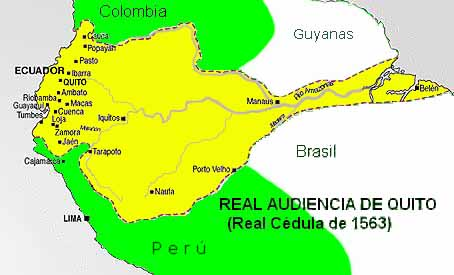
Map of Royal Audience of Quito. Most of its Amazonian territory was never under its effective control.

Between 1544 and 1563, Ecuador was a part of Spain's colonies in the New World under the Viceroyalty of Peru, having no administrative status independent of Lima. It remained a part of the Viceroyalty of Peru until 1720, when it joined the newly created Viceroyalty of New Granada; within the viceroyalty, however, Ecuador was awarded its own audiencia in 1563, allowing it to deal directly with Madrid on certain matters. The Quito Audiencia, which was both a court of justice and an advisory body to the viceroy, consisted of a president and several judges (oidores).

The most common form in which the Spanish occupied the land was the encomienda. By the early 17th century, there were some 500 encomiendas in Ecuador. Although many consisted of quite sizable haciendas, they were generally much smaller than the estates commonly found elsewhere in South America. A multitude of reforms and regulations did not prevent the encomienda from becoming a system of virtual slavery of the Native Ecuadorians, estimated at one-half the total Ecuadorian population, who lived on them. In 1589 the president of the audiencia recognized that many Spaniards were accepting grants only to sell them and undertake urban occupations, and he stopped distributing new lands to Spaniards; however, the institution of the encomienda persisted until nearly the end of the colonial period.

The coastal lowlands north of Manta were conquered, not by the Spanish, but by Black people from the Guinean coast who, as slaves, were shipwrecked en route from Panama to Peru in 1570. They killed or enslaved the native males and married the females, and within a generation they constituted a population of zambos that resisted Spanish authority until the end of the century and afterwards managed to retain a great deal of political and cultural independence.

The coastal economy revolved around shipping and trade. Guayaquil, despite being destroyed on several occasions by fire and incessantly plagued by either yellow fever or malaria, was a center of vigorous trade among the colonies, a trade that was technically illegal under the mercantilist philosophy of the contemporary Spanish rulers. Guayaquil also became the largest shipbuilding center on the west coast of South America before the end of the colonial period.

The Ecuadorian economy, like that in the mother country, suffered a severe depression throughout most of the 18th century. Textile production dropped an estimated 50 to 75 percent between 1700 and 1800. Ecuador's cities gradually fell into ruins, and by 1790 the elite was reduced to poverty, selling haciendas and jewelry in order to subsist. The Native Ecuadorian population, in contrast, probably experienced an overall improvement in its situation, as the closing of the obrajes commonly led Native Ecuadorians to work under less arduous conditions on either haciendas or traditional communal lands. Ecuador's economic woes were, no doubt, compounded by the expulsion of the Jesuits in 1767 by King Charles III of Spain. Missions in the Oriente were abandoned, and many of the best schools and the most efficient haciendas and obrajes lost the key that made them outstanding institutions in colonial Ecuador.

== Jesuits of Quito during the Colonial era ==
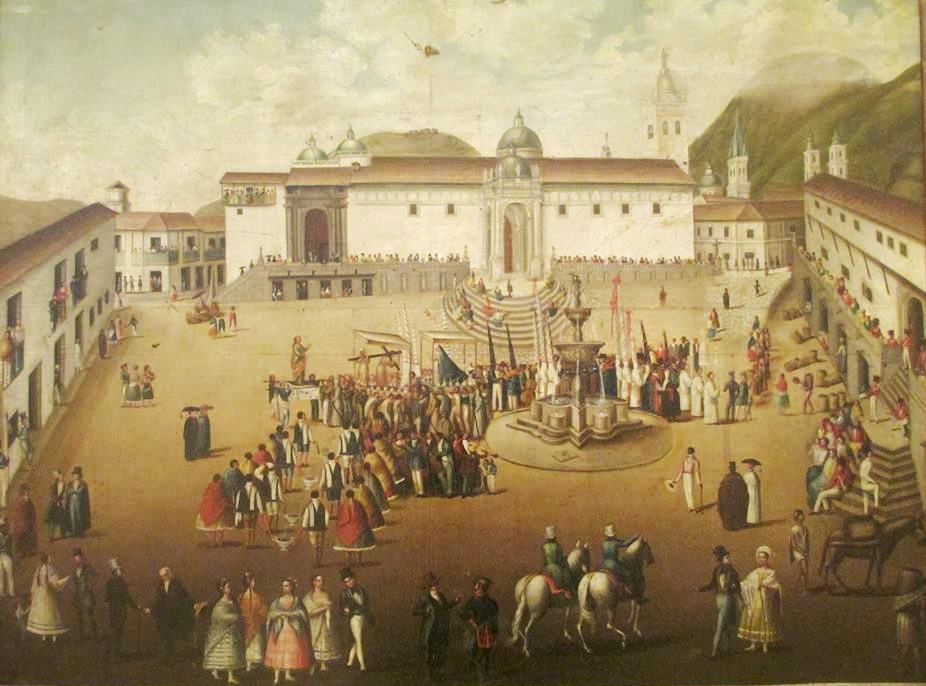
Major square of Quito. Painting of 18th century. Quito Painting Colonial School.

Father Rafael Ferrer was the first Jesuita de Quito (Jesuit of Quito) to explore and found missions in the upper Amazon regions of South America from 1602 to 1610, which at that period belonged to the Audiencia of Quito, that was a part of the Viceroyalty of Peru until the Audiencia of Quito was transferred to the newly created Viceroyalty of New Granada in 1717. In 1602, Father Rafael Ferrer began to explore the Aguarico, Napo, and Marañon rivers (Sucumbios region in what is today Ecuador and Peru), and set up, between 1604 and 1605, missions among the Cofan people. Father Rafael Ferrer was martyred in 1610.

In 1637, the Jesuits of Quito, Gaspar Cugia and Lucas de la Cueva began establishing missions in Mainas (or Maynas). These missions are now known as the Mainas missions after the Maina people, many of whom lived on the banks of the Marañón river, around the Pongo de Manseriche region, in close proximity to the Spanish settlement of Borja.

In 1639, the Audiencia of Quito organized an expedition to renew its exploration of the Amazon river and the Quito Jesuit (Jesuita Quiteño) Father Cristobal de Acuña was a part of this expedition. The expedition disembarked from the Napo river February 16, 1639, and arrived in what is today Pará Brazil, on the banks of the Amazon river on December 12, 1639. In 1641, Father Cristobal de Acuña published in Madrid a memoire of his expedition to the Amazon river. The title of the memoire is called Nuevo Descubrimiento del gran rio de las Amazonas, and it was used by academics as a fundamental reference pertaining to the Amazon region.

Between 1637 and 1652, there were 14 missions established along the Marañon river and its southern tributaries – the Huallaga and the Ucayali rivers. Jesuit Fathers de la Cueva and Raimundo de Santacruz opened up 2 new routes of communication with Quito, through the Pastaza and Napo rivers.

Between 1637 and 1715, Samuel Fritz founded 38 missions along the length of the Amazon river, between the Napo and Negro rivers, that were called the Omagua Missions. These missions were continually attacked by the Brazilian Bandeirantes beginning in the year 1705. In 1768, the only Omagua mission that was left was San Joaquin de Omaguas, since it had been moved to a new location on the Napo river away from the Bandeirantes.

In the immense territory of Mainas, also referred to as Maynas, the Jesuitas of Quito, made contact with a number of indigenous tribes which spoke 40 different languages, and founded a total of 173 Jesuit missions with a total population of 150,000 inhabitants. Because of the constant plague of epidemics (smallpox and measles) and warfare with other tribes and the Bandeirantes, the total number of Jesuit Missions were reduced to 40 by 1744. At the time when the Jesuits were expelled from Spanish America in 1767, the Jesuits of Quito registered 36 missions run by 25 Jesuits of Quito in the Audiencia of Quito – 6 Jesuits of Quito in the Napo Missions and Aguarico Missions, and 19 Jesuits of Quito in the Pastaza Missions and Iquitos Missions of Maynas with a total population of 20,000 inhabitants.

== Struggle for independence and birth of the republic ==
=== Quito Revolution (1809–1812) ===
The struggle for independence in the Quito Audiencia was part of a movement throughout Spanish America led by Criollos. The Criollos' resentment of the privileges enjoyed by the Peninsulares was the fuel of revolution against colonial rule. The spark was Napoleon's invasion of Spain, after which he deposed King Ferdinand VII and, in July 1808, placed his brother Joseph Bonaparte on the Spanish throne.

Shortly afterward, Spanish citizens, unhappy at the usurpation of the throne by the French, began organizing local juntas loyal to Ferdinand. A group of Quito's leading citizens followed suit, and on August 10, 1809, they seized power in the name of Ferdinand from the local representatives, whom they accused of preparing to recognize Joseph Bonaparte. Thus, this early revolt against colonial rule (one of the first in Spanish America) was, paradoxically, an expression of loyalty to the Spanish king.

It quickly became apparent that Quito's Criollo rebels lacked the anticipated popular support for their cause. As loyalist troops approached Quito, they peacefully turned power back to the crown authorities. Despite assurances against reprisals, the returning Spanish authorities proved to be merciless with the rebels and, in the process of ferreting out participants in the Quito revolt, jailed and abused many innocent citizens. Their actions, in turn, bred popular resentment among Quiteños, who, after several days of street fighting in August 1810, won an agreement to be governed by a junta composed with a majority of Criollos, although with the Peninsular president of the Royal Audience of Quito acting as its head.

In spite of strong opposition from the Quito Audiencia, the Junta called for a congress in December 1811 and declared the entire area of the audiencia to be independent of any government currently in Spain. Two months later, the Junta approved a constitution for the state of Quito that provided for democratic governing institutions but also granted recognition to the authority of Ferdinand should he return to the Spanish throne. Shortly thereafter, the Junta elected to launch a military offensive against loyalist regions to the south in Peru, but the poorly trained and badly equipped troops were no match for those of the Viceroy of Peru, which finally crushed the Quiteño rebellion in December 1812.

=== Ecuadorian War of Independence (1820–1822) ===
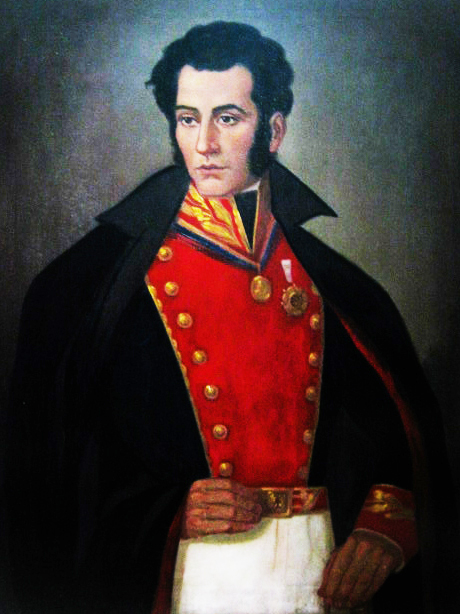
General Antonio José de Sucre, Commander In Chief, División del Sur.

The second chapter in Ecuador's struggle for emancipation from Spanish colonial rule began in Guayaquil, where independence was proclaimed in October 1820 by a local patriotic junta under the leadership of the poet José Joaquín de Olmedo. By this time, the forces of independence had grown continental in scope and were organized into two principal armies, one under the Venezuelan Simón Bolívar in the north and the other under the Argentine José de San Martín in the south. Unlike the hapless Quito junta of a decade earlier, the Guayaquil patriots were able to appeal to foreign allies, Argentina and Gran Colombia, each of whom soon responded by sending sizable contingents to Ecuador. Antonio José de Sucre, the brilliant young lieutenant of Bolívar who arrived in Guayaquil in May 1821, was to become the key figure in the ensuing military struggle against the royalist forces.

After a number of initial successes, Sucre's army was defeated at Ambato in the central Sierra and he appealed for assistance from San Martín, whose army was by now in Peru. With the arrival from the south of 1,400 fresh soldiers under the command of Andrés de Santa Cruz Calahumana, the fortunes of the patriotic army were again reversed. A string of victories culminated in the decisive Battle of Pichincha.

Two months later Bolívar, the liberator of northern South America, entered Quito to a hero's welcome. Later that July, he met San Martín at the Guayaquil conference and convinced the Argentine general, who wanted the port to return to Peruvian jurisdiction, and the local Criollo elite in both major cities of the advantage of having the former Quito Audiencia join with the liberated lands to the north. As a result, Ecuador became the District of the South within the Republic of Gran Colombia, which also included present-day Venezuela and Colombia and had Bogotá as its capital. This status was maintained for eight tumultuous years.

=== Gran Colombia (1822–1830) ===
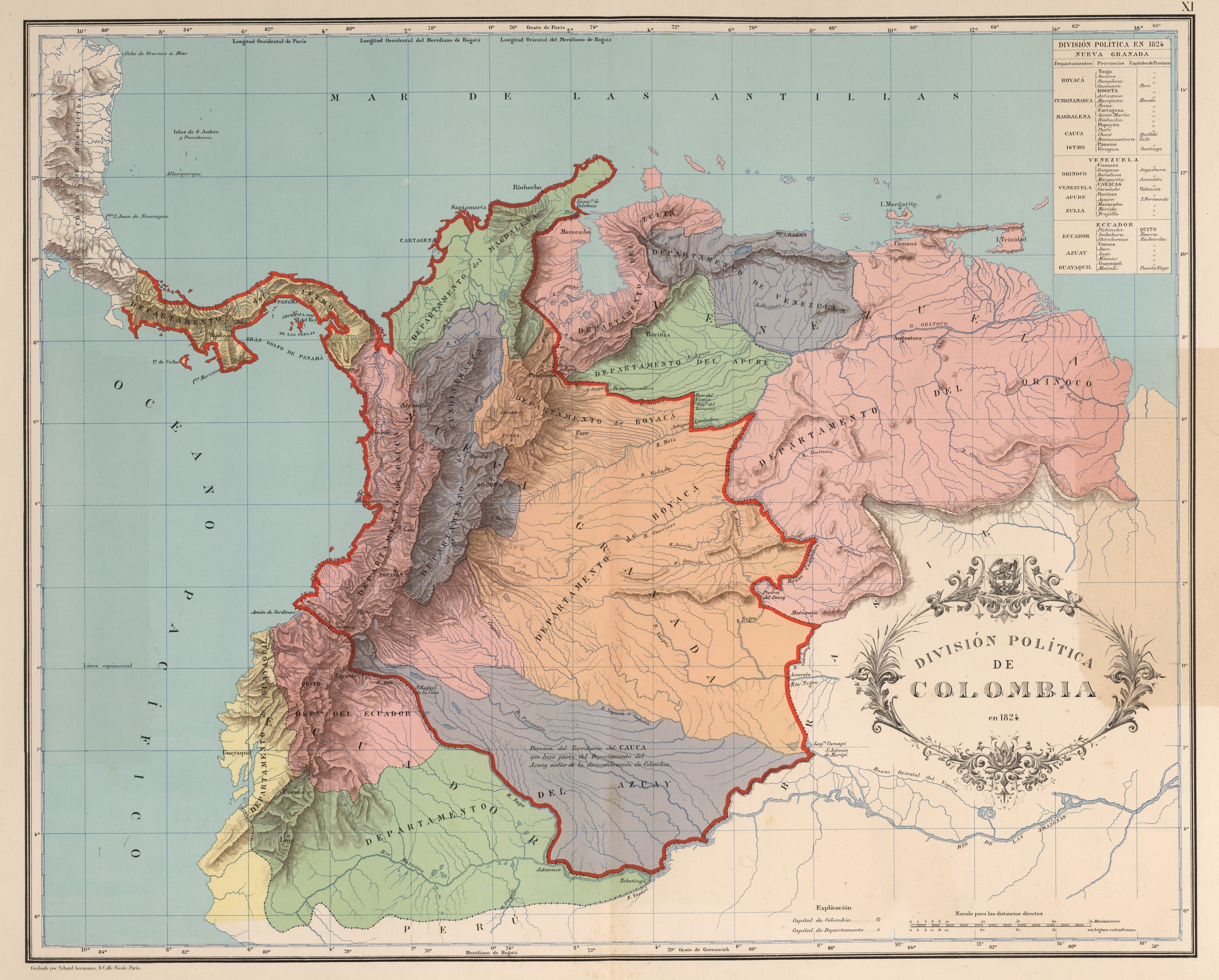
Map of the former Gran Colombia in 1824 (named in its time as Colombia), Gran Colombia included all shaded areas.

These were years in which warfare dominated the affairs of Ecuador. First, the country found itself on the front lines of Gran Colombia's efforts to liberate Peru from Spanish rule between 1822 and 1825; afterward, in 1828 and 1829, Ecuador was in the middle of an armed struggle between Peru and Gran Colombia over the location of their common border. After a campaign that included the near destruction of Guayaquil, the forces of Gran Colombia, under the leadership of Sucre and Venezuelan General Juan José Flores, proved victorious. The Treaty of 1829 fixed the border on the line that had divided the Quito audiencia and the Viceroyalty of Peru before independence.

The population of Ecuador was divided during these years among three segments: those favoring the status quo, those supporting union with Peru, and those advocating independence for the former audiencia. The latter group was to prevail following Venezuela's withdrawal from Gran Colombia at the very moment that an 1830 constitutional congress had been called in an ultimately futile effort to stem the growing separatist tendencies throughout the country.
In May of that year, a group of Quito notables met to dissolve the union with Gran Colombia, and in August, a constituent assembly drew up a constitution for the State of Ecuador, so named for its geographic proximity to the equator, and placed General Flores in charge of political and military affairs. He remained the dominant political figure during Ecuador's first 15 years of independence.

== Liberal and conservative elites in an agrarian republic ==
=== The early republic ===
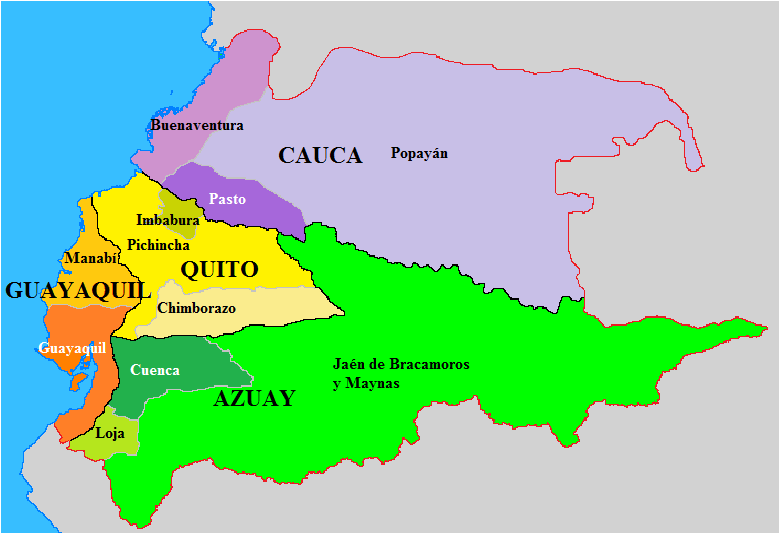
Ecuador in 1830

Before the year 1830 drew to a close, both Marshal Sucre and Simón Bolívar would be dead, the former murdered (on orders from a jealous General Flores, according to some historians) and the latter from tuberculosis.

Juan José Flores, known as the founder of the republic, was of the foreign military variety. Born in Venezuela, he had fought in the wars for independence with Bolívar, who had appointed him governor of Ecuador during its association with Gran Colombia. As a leader, however, he appeared primarily interested in maintaining his power. Military expenditures, from the independence wars and from an unsuccessful campaign to wrest Cauca Province from Colombia in 1832, kept the state treasury empty while other matters were left unattended. That same year, Ecuador annexed the Galapagos Islands.

Discontent had become nationwide by 1845, when an insurrection in Guayaquil forced Flores from the country. Because their movement triumphed in March (marzo), the anti-Flores coalition members became known as marcistas. They were an extremely heterogeneous lot that included liberal intellectuals, conservative clergymen, and representatives from Guayaquil's successful business community.

The next fifteen years constituted one of the most turbulent periods in Ecuador's two centuries as a nation. The marcistas fought among themselves almost ceaselessly and also had to struggle against Flores's repeated attempts from exile to overthrow the government. The most significant figure of the era, however, was General José María Urbina, who first came to power in 1851 through a coup d'état, remained in the presidency until 1856, and then continued to dominate the political scene until 1860. During this decade and the one that followed, Urbina and his archrival, García Moreno, would define the dichotomy — between Liberals from Guayaquil and Conservatives from Quito — that remained the major sphere of political struggle in Ecuador until the 1980s.

By 1859 — known by Ecuadorian historians as "the Terrible Year" — the nation was on the brink of anarchy. Local caudillos had declared several regions autonomous of the central government, known as Jefaturas Supremas. One of these caudillos, Guayaquil's Guillermo Franco, signed the Treaty of Mapasingue, ceding the southern provinces of Ecuador to an occupying Peruvian army led by General Ramón Castilla. This action was outrageous enough to unite some previously disparate elements. García Moreno, putting aside both his project to place Ecuador under a French protectorate and his differences with General Flores, got together with the former dictator to put down the various local rebellions and force out the Peruvians. The final push of this effort was the defeat of Franco's Peruvian-backed forces at the Battle of Guayaquil, which led to the overturning of the Treaty of Mapasingue. This opened the last chapter of Flores's long career and marked the entrance to the power of García Moreno.

=== The era of conservatism (1860–1895) ===
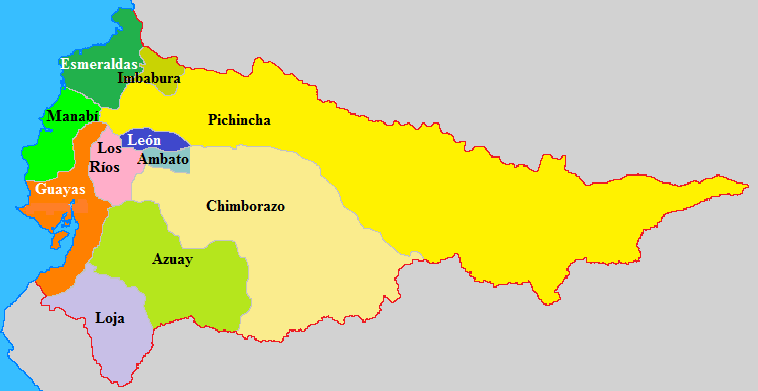
Mainland Ecuador in 1860

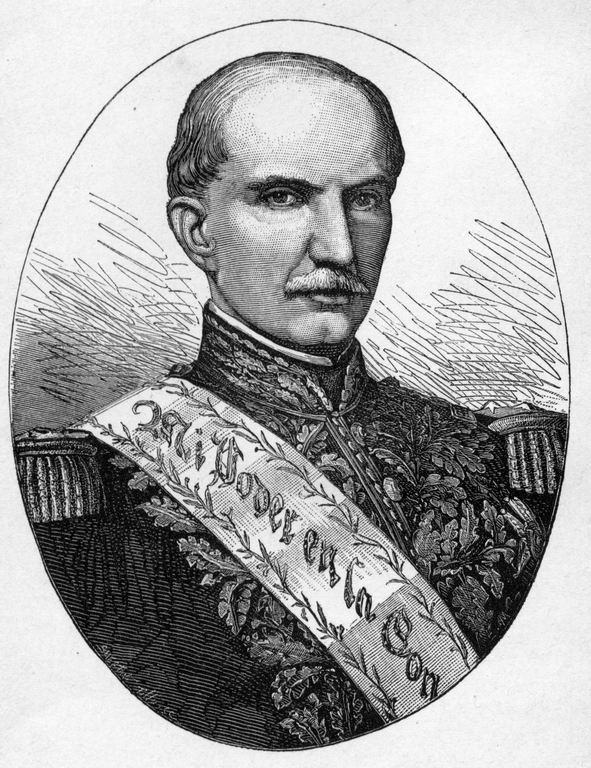
Gabriel Garcia Moreno, considered the Father of Ecuadorian conservatism.

Gabriel García Moreno was a leading figure of Ecuadorian conservatism. Shortly after the onset of his third presidential term in 1875, García Moreno was attacked with a machete on the steps of the presidential palace by Faustino Lemos Rayo, a Colombian. As he was dying, García Moreno took out his gun and shot Faustino Lemos, while he said "Dios no muere" ("God doesn't die"). The dictator's most outstanding critic was the liberal journalist, Juan Montalvo, who exclaimed, "My pen killed him!"

Between 1852 and 1890, Ecuador's exports grew in value from slightly more than US$1 million to nearly US$10 million. Production of cacao, the most important export product in the late 19th century, grew from 6.5 to 18 million kilograms (14 to 40 million pounds) during the same period. The agricultural export interests, centered in the coastal region near Guayaquil, became closely associated with the Liberals, whose political power also grew steadily during the interval. After the death of García Moreno, it took the Liberals twenty years to consolidate their strength sufficiently to assume control of the government in Quito.

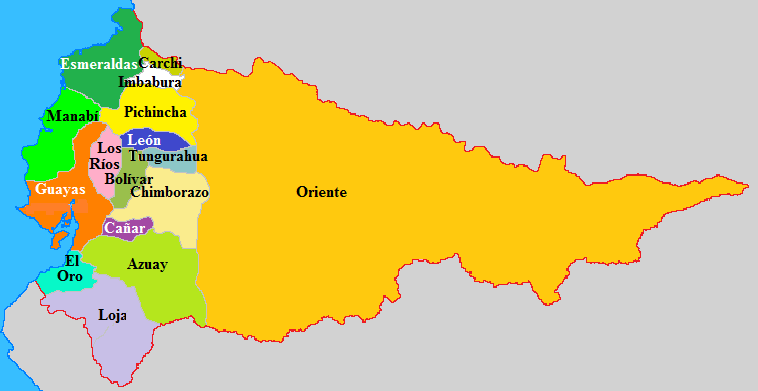
Mainland Ecuador in 1893

=== The liberal era (1895–1925) ===
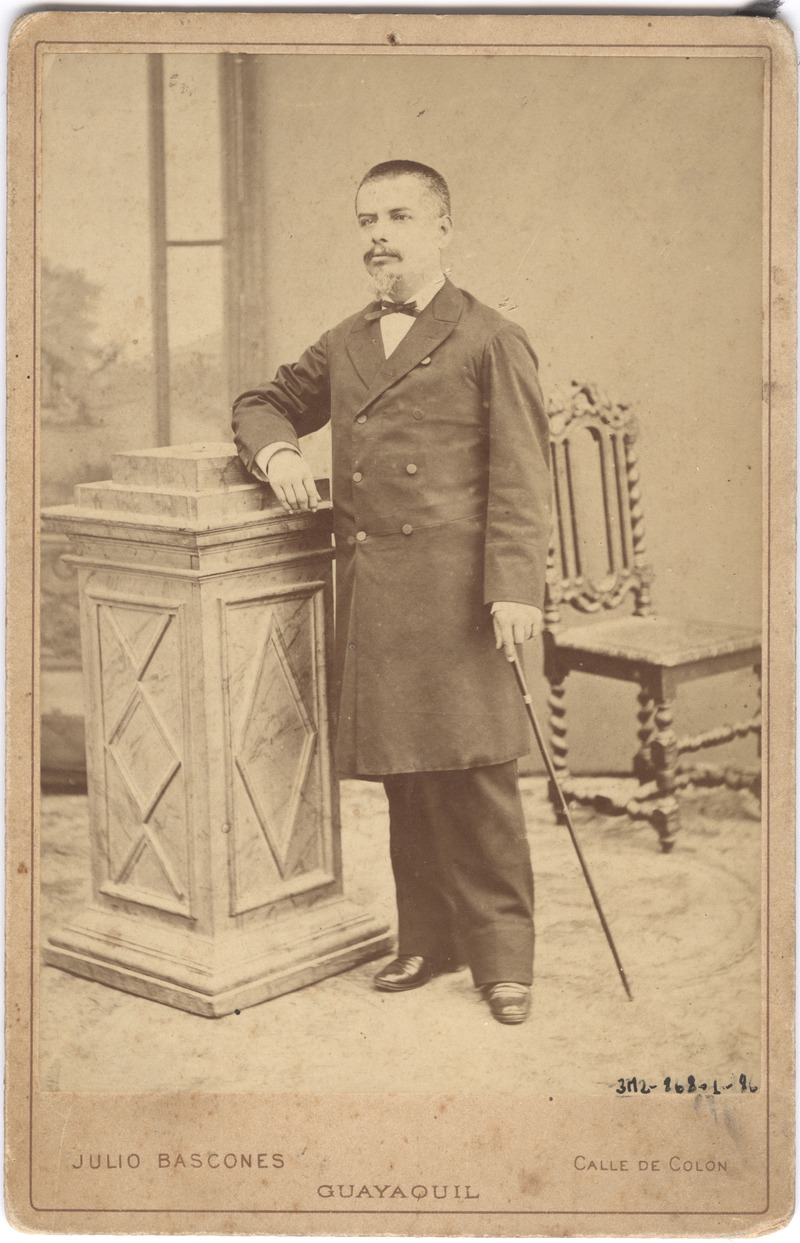
Eloy Alfaro

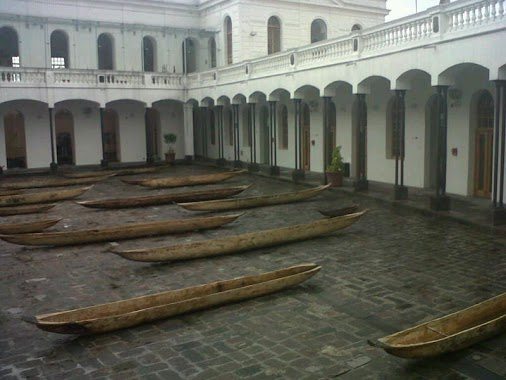
Antique dug out canoes in the courtyard of the Old Military Hospital in the Historic Center of Quito.

The new era brought in liberalism. Eloy Alfaro, under whose direction the government headed out to aid those in the rural sectors of the coast, is credited for finishing the construction of the railroad connecting Guayaquil and Quito, the separation of church and state, establishment of many public schools, implementing civil rights (such as freedom of speech), and the legalization of civil marriages and divorce.

Alfaro was also confronted by a dissident tendency inside his own party, directed by its General Leonidas Plaza and constituted by the upper middle class of Guayaquil. His death was followed by economic liberalism (1912–25), when banks were allowed to acquire almost complete control of the country. During the 1920s, Ecuador's key export, cacao beans, were devastated by disease at the same time that its cacao producers faced increased competition from West Africa. The loss of export earnings seriously damaged the economy.

During the liberal era, the global demand for Amazonian rubber also transformed the Ecuadorian Amazon region (the "Oriente"). Despite state efforts to expand power over the Oriente, the close ties to Iquitos and insufficient support from the central government did not allow the state to collect revenue from the rubber economy. By the end of the liberal era, state power in the Oriente remained weak, but not absent.

Popular unrest, together with the ongoing economic crisis and a sickly president, laid the background for a bloodless coup d'état in July 1925. Unlike all previous forays by the military into Ecuadorian politics, the coup of 1925 was made in the name of a collective grouping rather than a particular caudillo. The members of the League of Young Officers came to power with an agenda, which included a wide variety of social reforms, such as dealing with the failing economy, establishing the Central Bank as the unique authorized bank to distribute currency, and creating a new system of budget and customs.

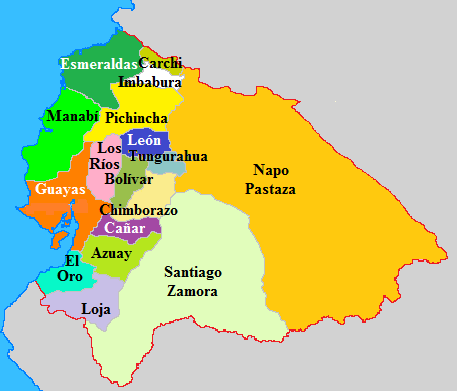
Mainland Ecuador in 1920

=== Early 20th century ===
Much of the 20th century was dominated by José María Velasco Ibarra, whose five presidential terms began with a mandate in 1934 and final presidency ending in 1972. However, the only term he actually completed was his third from 1952 to 1956.

Much of the century was also dominated by the territorial dispute between Peru and Ecuador. In 1941 Ecuador invaded Peruvian territory, and the Peruvians counterattacked and forced them to retreat into their own territory. At that time Ecuador was immersed in internal political fights and was not well equipped to win its offensive war.

With the world at war, Ecuador attempted to settle the matter by means of a third-party settlement. In Brazil the two countries' negotiations were overseen by four "Guarantor" states (Argentina, Brazil, Chile, and the United States — four of the most powerful countries in the region). The resulting treaty is known as the Rio Protocol. The protocol became the focus of a surge of Ecuadorian national pride and concomitant opposition, which resulted in an uprising and overthrow of the government.

=== The postwar era (1944–1948) ===
The Quiteño multitudes stood in the pouring rain on May 31, 1944, to hear Velasco promise a "national resurrection", with social justice and due punishment for the "corrupt Liberal oligarchy" that had been responsible for "staining the national honor", believed that they were witnessing the birth of a popular revolution. Liberal partisans were promptly jailed or sent into exile, while Velasco verbally baited the business community and the rest of the political right. The leftist elements within Velasco's Democratic Alliance, which dominated the constituent assembly that was convened to write a new constitution, were nonetheless destined to be disappointed.

In May 1945, after a year of growing hostility between the president and the assembly, which was vainly awaiting deeds to substantiate Velasco's rhetorical advocacy of social justice, the mercurial chief executive condemned and then repudiated the newly completed constitution. After dismissing the assembly, Velasco held elections for a new assembly, which in 1946 drafted a far more conservative constitution that met with the president's approval. For this brief period, Conservatives replaced the left as Velasco's base of support.

Rather than attending to the nation's economic problems, however, Velasco aggravated them by financing the dubious schemes of his associates. Inflation continued unabated, as did its negative impact on the national standard of living, and by 1947 foreign exchange reserves had fallen to dangerously low levels. In August, when Velasco was ousted by his minister of defense, nobody rose to defend the man who, only three years earlier, had been hailed as the nation's savior. During the following year, three different men briefly held executive power before Galo Plaza Lasso, running under a coalition of independent Liberals and socialists, narrowly defeated his Conservative opponent in presidential elections. His inauguration in September 1948 initiated what was to become the longest period of constitutional rule since the 1912–24 heyday of the Liberal plutocracy.

=== Constitutional rule (1947–1960) ===
Galo Plaza differed from previous Ecuadorian presidents by bringing a developmentalist and technocratic emphasis to Ecuadorian government. No doubt Galo Plaza's most important contribution to Ecuadorian political culture was his commitment to the principles and practices of democracy. As president he promoted agricultural exports of Ecuador, such as bananas, creating economic stability. During his presidency, an earthquake near Ambato severely damaged the city and surrounding areas and killed approximately 8,000 people. Unable to succeed himself, he left his office in 1952 as the first president in 28 years to complete his term in office.

A proof of the politically stabilizing effect of the banana boom of the 1950s is that even Velasco, who in 1952 was elected president for the third time, managed to serve out a full four-year term. Velasco's fourth term in the presidency initiated a renewal of crisis, instability, and military domination and ended conjecture that the political system had matured or developed in a democratic mold.

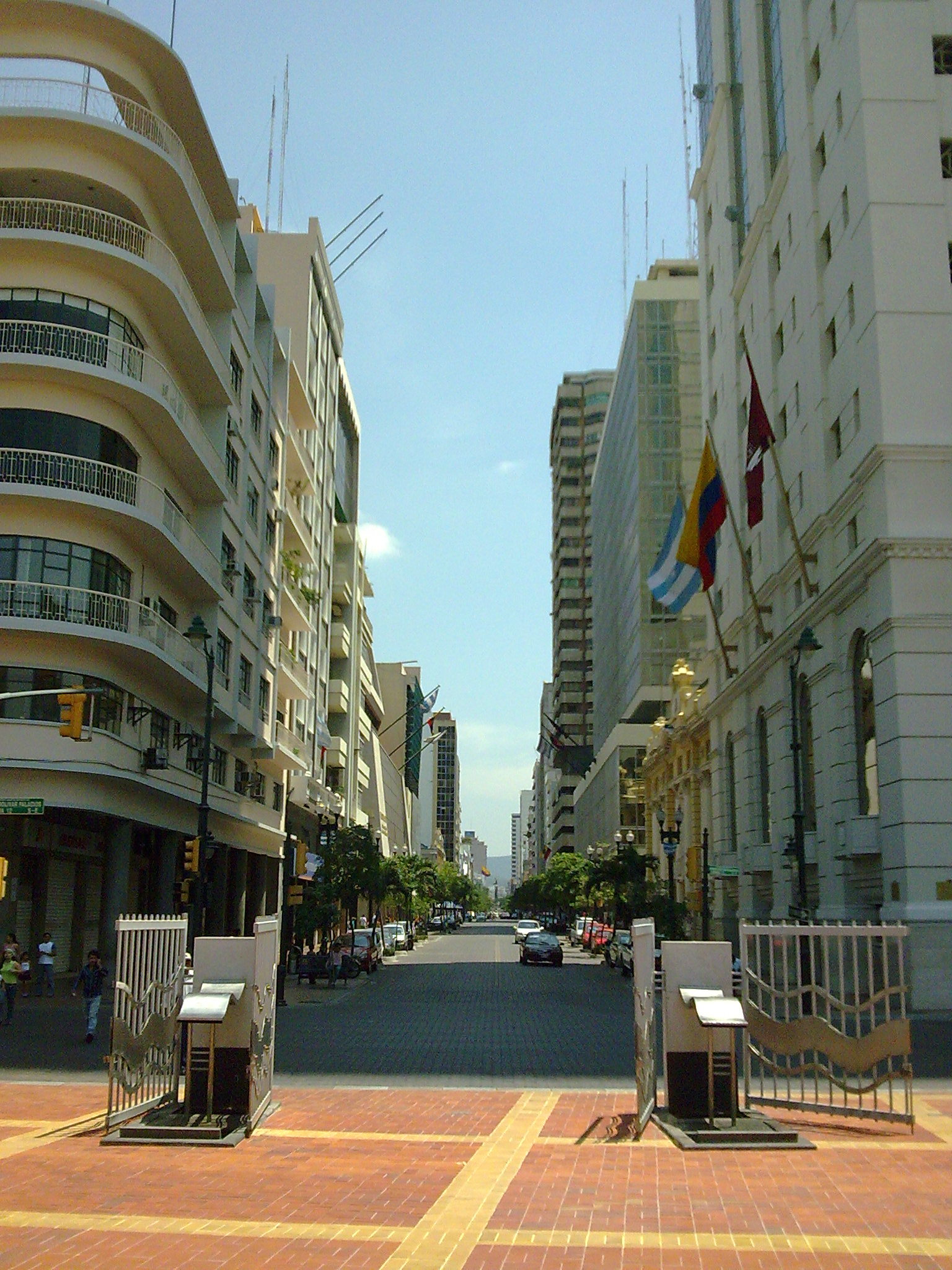
The banana boom of the mid-20th century boosted the economy of Guayaquil, where office buildings like these were built.

== The modern republic develops ==
=== Instability and military governments (1960–1979) ===
In 1963, the army overthrew President Carlos Julio Arosemena Monroy, falsely accusing him of "sympathizing with communism". According to former CIA agent Philip Agee, who served several years in Ecuador, the United States incited this coup d'état to eliminate a government that refused to break with Cuba.

In 1976 the military triumvirate, pressured by internal and external public consensus, began a process of return to the constitutional system. The moment was seen by the ruling classes and sectors as the ideal moment to legitimize their power by restoring the traditional procedures of control of power. However, divisions among the Armed Forces, whose leaders included Colonel Richelieu Levoyer, René Vargas, and others, led to the drafting of alternative proposed constitutions. Through a referendum, a new Constitution was approved in January (1978). It increased representation for groups traditionally excluded from power, such as indigenous people, trade unions, and leftist political parties. In the elections of 1978-79 the progressive candidate, Jaime Roldós Aguilera, triumphed against the conservative Sixto Durán Ballén, who had the implicit backing of military leaders.

=== Return to democratic rule (1979–1990) ===
Jaime Roldós Aguilera, democratically elected in 1979, presided over a nation that had undergone profound changes during the seventeen years of military rule. There were impressive indicators of economic growth between 1972 and 1979: The government budget expanded some 540 percent, whereas exports as well as per capita income increased a full 500 percent. Industrial development had also progressed, stimulated by the new oil wealth as well as Ecuador's preferential treatment under the provisions of the Andean Common Market (AnCoM, also known as the Andean Pact).

Roldós was killed, along with his wife and the minister of defense, in an airplane crash in the southern province of Loja on May 24, 1981. The death of Roldós generated intense popular speculation. Some Ecuadorian nationalists attributed it to the Peruvian government because the crash took place near the border where the two nations had participated in the Paquisha War in their perpetual border dispute. Many of the nation's leftists, pointing to a similar crash that had killed Panamanian President Omar Torrijos Herrera less than three months later, blamed the United States government.

Roldós's constitutional successor, Osvaldo Hurtado, immediately faced an economic crisis brought on by the sudden end of the petroleum boom. Massive foreign borrowing, initiated during the years of the second military regime and continued under Roldós, resulted in a foreign debt that by 1983 was nearly US$7 billion. The nation's petroleum reserves declined sharply during the early 1980s because of exploration failures and rapidly increasing domestic consumption. The economic crisis was aggravated in 1982 and 1983 by drastic climatic changes, bringing severe drought as well as flooding, precipitated by the appearance of the unusually warm ocean current known as "El Niño". Analysts estimated damage to the nation's infrastructure at US$640 million, with balance-of-payments losses of some US$300 million. Real gross domestic product growth fell to 2% in 1982 and to −3.3% in 1983. The rate of inflation in 1983, 52.5%, was the highest ever recorded in the nation's history.

Outside observers noted that, however unpopular, Hurtado deserved credit for keeping Ecuador in good standing with the international financial community and for consolidating Ecuador's democratic political system under extremely difficult conditions. As León Febres Cordero entered office on August 10, there was no end in sight to the economic crisis nor to the intense struggle that characterized the political process in Ecuador.

During the first years of his administration, Febres Cordero introduced free-market economic policies, took a strong stand against drug trafficking and terrorism, and pursued close relations with the United States. His tenure was marred by bitter wrangling with other branches of government and his own brief kidnapping by elements of the military. A devastating earthquake in March 1987 interrupted oil exports and worsened the country's economic problems.

Rodrigo Borja Cevallos of the Democratic Left (ID) party won the presidency in 1988, running in the runoff election against Abdalá Bucaram of the PRE. His government was committed to improving human rights protection and carried out some reforms, notably an opening of Ecuador to foreign trade. The Borja government concluded an accord leading to the disbanding of the small terrorist group "¡Alfaro Vive, Carajo!" ("Alfaro Lives, Dammit!"), named after Eloy Alfaro. However, continuing economic problems undermined the popularity of the ID, and opposition parties gained control of Congress in 1990.

=== Economic crisis (1990–2000) ===
In 1992, Sixto Durán Ballén won his third run for the presidency. His tough macroeconomic adjustment measures were unpopular, but he succeeded in pushing a limited number of modernization initiatives through Congress. Durán Ballén's vice president, Alberto Dahik, was the architect of the administration's economic policies, but in 1995, Dahik fled the country to avoid prosecution on corruption charges following a heated political battle with the opposition. A war with Peru (named the Cenepa War, after a river located in the area) erupted in January–February 1995 in a small, remote region, where the boundary prescribed by the 1942 Rio Protocol was in dispute. The Durán Ballén administration can be credited with beginning the negotiations that would end in a final settlement of the territorial dispute.

In 1996, Abdalá Bucaram, from the populist Ecuadorian Roldosista Party, won the presidency on a platform that promised populist economic and social reforms. Almost from the start, Bucaram's administration languished amidst widespread allegations of corruption. Empowered by the president's unpopularity with organized labor, business, and professional organizations alike, Congress unseated Bucaram in February 1997 on grounds of mental incompetence. The Congress replaced Bucaram with Interim President Fabián Alarcón.

In May 1997, following the demonstrations that led to the ousting of Bucaram and appointment of Alarcón, the people of Ecuador called for a National Assembly to reform the Constitution and the country's political structure. After a little more than a year, the National Assembly produced a new Constitution.

Congressional and first-round presidential elections were held on May 31, 1998. No presidential candidate obtained a majority, so a run-off election between the top two candidates – Quito Mayor Jamil Mahuad of the DP and Social Christian Álvaro Noboa Pontón – was held on July 12, 1998. Mahuad won by a narrow margin. He took office on August 10, 1998. On the same day, Ecuador's new constitution came into effect.

Mahuad faced a difficult economic situation, linked in particular to the Asian financial crisis. The currency was devalued by 15%, fuel and electricity prices increased fivefold, and public transport prices increased by 40%. The government was preparing to privatize several key sectors of the economy: oil, electricity, telecommunications, ports, airports, railways, and the post office. The repression of a first general strike caused three deaths. The social situation was critical: more than half of the population was unemployed, 60% lived below the extreme poverty line, and public employees had not been paid for three months. A further increase in VAT, combined with the abolition of subsidies for domestic gas, electricity and diesel, triggered a new social movement. In the provinces of Latacunga, the army shot the indigenous people who blocked the Pan-American Highway, injuring 17 people with bullets.

The coup de grâce for Mahuad's administration was Mahuad's decision to make the local currency, the sucre (named after Antonio José de Sucre), obsolete and replace it with the US dollar (a policy called dollarization). This caused massive unrest as the lower classes struggled to convert their now useless sucres to US dollars and lost wealth, while the upper classes (whose members already had their wealth invested in US dollars) gained wealth in turn. Under Mahuad's recession-plagued term, the economy shrank significantly, and inflation reached levels of up to 60 percent.

In addition, corruption scandals were a source of public concern. Former Vice President Alberto Dahik, architect of the neoliberal economic program, fled abroad after being indicted for "questionable use of reserved funds". Former President Fabián Alarcón was arrested on charges of paying salaries for more than a thousand fictitious jobs. President Mahuad was accused of receiving money from drug trafficking during his election campaign. Several major bankers were also cited in cases. Mahuad concluded a well-received peace with Peru on October 26, 1998.

=== Instability (2000–2007) ===
On January 21, 2000, during demonstrations in Quito by indigenous groups, the military and police refused to enforce public order, beginning what became known as the 2000 Ecuadorean coup d'état. Demonstrators entered the National Assembly building and declared, in a move that resembled the coups d'état endemic to Ecuadorean history, a three-person junta in charge of the country. Field-grade military officers declared their support for the concept. During a night of confusion and failed negotiations, President Mahuad was forced to flee the presidential palace for his own safety. Vice President Gustavo Noboa took charge by vice-presidential decree; Mahuad went on national television in the morning to endorse Noboa as his successor. The military triumvirate that was effectively running the country also endorsed Noboa. The Ecuadorean Congress then met in an emergency session in Guayaquil on the same day, January 22, and ratified Noboa as President of the Republic in constitutional succession to Mahuad.

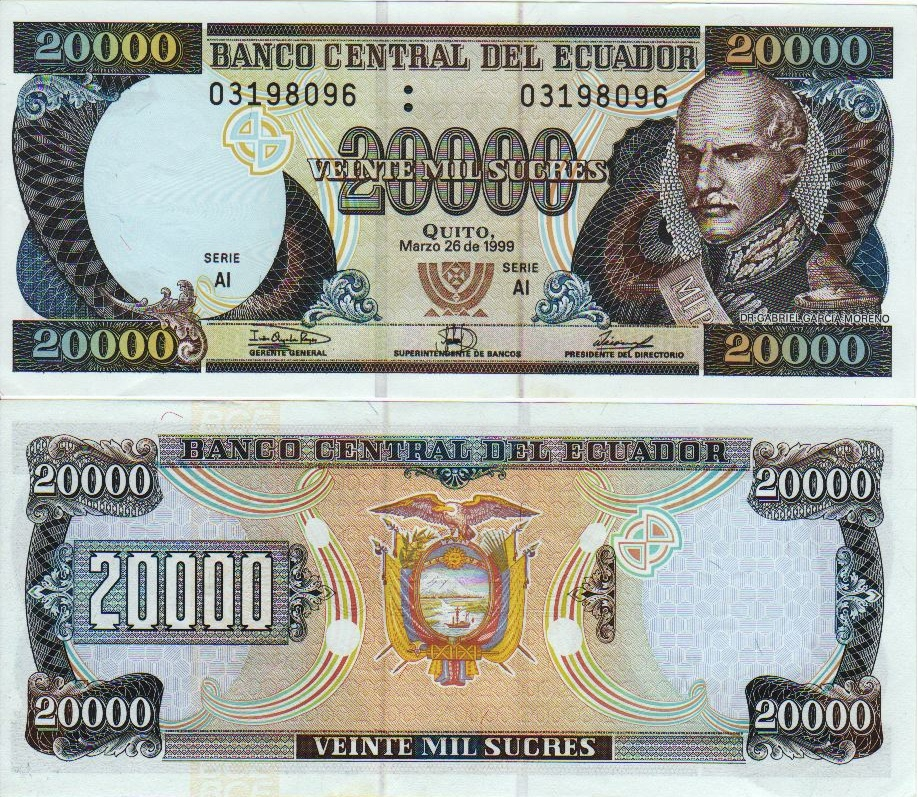
In 2000, Ecuador replaced its currency, the sucre, with the US dollar. When the dollar was introduced, this 20,000-sucre bill was worth 80 US cents.

The US dollar became the only official currency of Ecuador in 2000. Although Ecuador began to improve economically in the following months, the government of Noboa came under heavy fire for the continuation of the dollarization policy, its disregard for social problems, and other important issues in Ecuadorean politics.

Retired Colonel Lucio Gutiérrez, a member of the military junta that overthrew Mahuad, was elected president in 2002 and assumed the presidency on January 15, 2003. Gutierrez's Patriotic Society Party had a small fraction of the seats in Congress and therefore depended on the support of other parties in Congress to pass legislation.

In December 2004, Gutiérrez unconstitutionally dissolved the Supreme Court and appointed new judges to it. This move was generally seen as a kickback to deposed ex-President Abdalá Bucaram, whose political party had sided with Gutiérrez and helped derail attempts to impeach him in late 2004. The new Supreme Court dropped charges of corruption pending against the exiled Bucaram, who soon returned to the politically unstable country. The corruption evident in these maneuvers finally led Quito's middle classes to seek the ousting of Gutiérrez in early 2005. In April 2005, the Ecuadorian Armed Forces declared that it was withdrawing its support for the President. After weeks of public protests, Gutiérrez was overthrown in April. Vice President Alfredo Palacio assumed the presidency and vowed to complete the term of office and hold elections in 2006.

=== Rafael Correa (2007-2017) ===
On January 15, 2007, the social democrat Rafael Correa succeeded Palacio as President of Ecuador, with the promise of summoning a constituent assembly and focusing on poverty. The 2007-8 Ecuadorian Constituent Assembly drafted the 2008 Constitution of Ecuador, approved via the Ecuadorian constitutional referendum, 2008. The new socialist constitution implemented leftist reforms.

In November 2009, Ecuador faced an energy crisis that led to power rationing across the country.

Between 2006 and 2016, poverty decreased from 36.7% to 22.5% and annual per capita GDP growth was 1.5 percent (as compared to 0.6 percent over the prior two decades). At the same time, inequalities, as measured by the Gini index, decreased from 0.55 to 0.47.

Beginning in 2007, President Rafael Correa established The Citizens' Revolution, a movement following left-wing policies, which some sources describe as populist. Correa was able to utilize the 2000s commodities boom to fund his policies, utilizing China's need for raw materials. Through China, Correa accepted loans that had few requirements, as opposed to firm limits set by other lenders. With this funding, Ecuador was able to invest in social welfare programs, reduce poverty and increase the average standard of living in Ecuador, while at the same time growing Ecuador's economy. Such policies resulted in a popular base of support for Correa, who was re-elected to the presidency three times between 2007 and 2013. Media coverage in the United States viewed Correa's strong popular support and efforts to re-found the Ecuadorian state as an entrenchment of power.

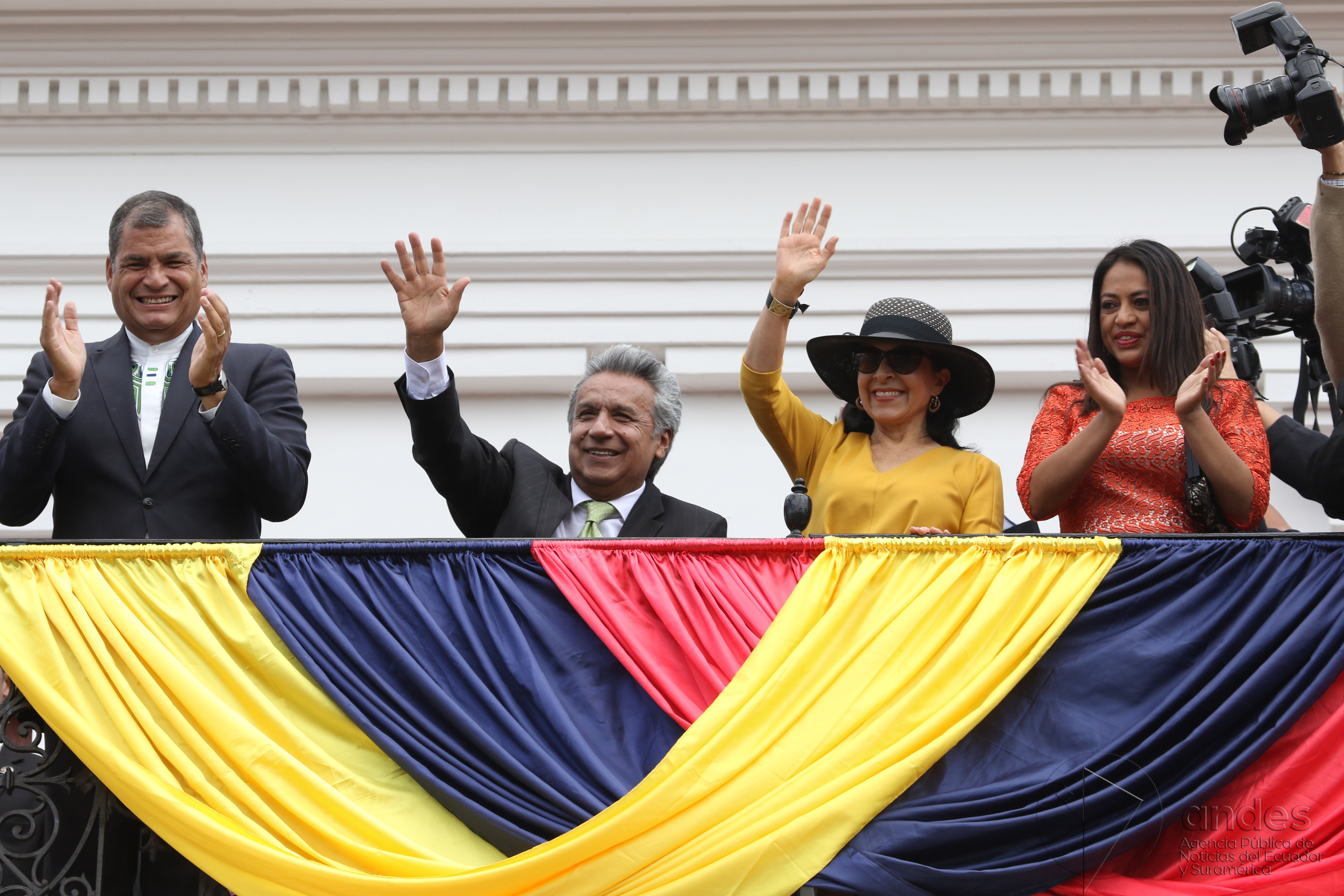
Former President Rafael Correa (left) attends President-elect Lenín Moreno's (middle) "changing of the guard" ceremony. The two PAIS leaders were considered close allies before Moreno's "de-Correaization" efforts started after he assumed the presidency.

As the Ecuadorian economy began to decline in 2014, Correa decided not to run for a fourth term and by 2015, protests occurred against Correa following the introduction of austerity measures and an increase of inheritance taxes. Instead, Lenín Moreno, who was at the time a staunch Correa loyalist and had served as his vice-president for over six years, was expected to continue with Correa's legacy and the implementation of 21st century socialism in the country, running on a broadly left-wing platform with significant similarities to Correa's.

=== A shift to the right and social conflict (2017–present) ===
==== Moreno's presidency (2017–2021) ====
Rafael Correa's three consecutive terms (from 2007 to 2017) were followed by his former Vice President Lenín Moreno's four years as president (2017–21). In the weeks after his election, Moreno distanced himself from Correa's policies and shifted the left-wing PAIS Alliance's away from the left-wing politics and towards the neoliberal governance. Despite these policy shifts, Moreno continued to identify himself as social democrat. Moreno then led the 2018 Ecuadorian referendum, which reinstated presidential term limits that were removed by Correa, barring Correa from running for a fourth presidential term in the future. At his election, Moreno enjoyed an approval rating of 79 percent. Moreno's distancing from his predecessor's policies and his electoral campaign's platform, however, alienated both former President Correa and a large percentage of his own party's supporters. In July 2018, a warrant for Correa's arrest was issued after facing 29 charges for alleged acts of corruption while he was in office.

Due to increased borrowing by Correa's administration, which he had used to fund social welfare projects, as well as the 2010s oil glut, public debt tripled in a five-year period, with Ecuador eventually coming to use of the Central Bank of Ecuador's reserves for funds. In total, Ecuador was left $64 billion in debt and was losing $10 billion annually. On 21 August 2018, Moreno announced economic austerity measures to reduce public spending and the deficit. Moreno stated that the measures aimed to save $1 billion and included a reduction of fuel subsidies, eliminating subsidies for gasoline and diesel, and the removal or merging of several public entities, a move denounced by the groups representing the nation's indigenous groups and trade unions.

At the same time, Lenín Moreno moved away from his predecessor's left-leaning foreign policy. In August 2018, Ecuador withdrew from Bolivarian Alliance for the Peoples of Our America (Alba), a regional bloc of leftwing governments led by Venezuela. In October 2018, the government of President Lenin Moreno cut diplomatic relations with the Nicolás Maduro regime of Venezuela, a close ally of Rafael Correa. In March 2019, Ecuador withdrew from Union of South American Nations. Ecuador was an original member of the block, founded by left-wing governments in Latin America and the Caribbean in 2008. Ecuador also asked UNASUR to return the headquarters building of the organization, based in its capital city, Quito. In June 2019, Ecuador agreed to allow US military planes to operate from an airport on the Galapagos Islands.

In October 2019, Lenín Moreno announced a package of economic measures as part of a deal with the International Monetary Fund (IMF) to obtain US$4.2 billion in credit. These measures became known as "el paquetazo" and they included the end of fuel subsidies, removal of some import tariffs and cuts in public worker benefits and wages. This caused mass protests which began on 3 October 2019. On 8 October, President Moreno relocated his government to the coastal city of Guayaquil after anti-government protesters had overrun Quito, including the Carondelet Palace. On the same day, Moreno accused his predecessor Rafael Correa of orchestrating a coup against the government with the aid of Venezuela's Nicolás Maduro, a charge which Correa denied. Later that day, the authorities shut down oil production at the Sacha oil field, which produces 10% of the nation's oil, after it was occupied by protesters. Two more oil fields were captured by protesters shortly thereafter. Demonstrators also captured repeater antennas, forcing state TV and radio offline in parts of the country. Indigenous protesters, organized by the CONAIE confederation, blocked most of Ecuador's main roads, completely cutting the transport routes to the city of Cuenca. On 9 October, protesters managed to briefly burst into and occupy the National Assembly, before being driven out by police using tear gas. Violent clashes erupted between demonstrators and police forces as the protests spread further. During the late-night hours of 13 October, the Ecuadorian government and CONAIE reached an agreement during a televised negotiation. Both parties agreed to collaborate on new economic measures to combat overspending and debt. The government agreed to end the austerity measures at the center of the controversy, and the protesters in turn agreed to end the two-week-long series of demonstrations. President Moreno agreed to withdraw Decree 883, an IMF-backed plan that caused a significant rise in fuel costs.

Relations with the United States improved significantly during the presidency of Lenin Moreno. In February 2020, his visit to Washington was the first meeting between an Ecuadorian and US president in 17 years.

==== Lasso's (2021–2023) and Noboa's (since 2023) presidencies ====
The April 2021 election run-off vote ended in a win for conservative former banker, Guillermo Lasso, who took 52.4% of the vote compared to 47.6% for left-wing economist Andrés Arauz, supported by the exiled former president, Rafael Correa. Previously, President-elect Lasso had finished second in the 2013 and 2017 presidential elections. On 24 May 2021, Guillermo Lasso was sworn in as the new President of Ecuador, becoming the country's first right-wing leader in 14 years.

In October 2021, President Lasso declared a 60-day state of emergency aiming to combat crime and drug-related violence. In October 2022, a bloody riot among inmates at a prison in central Ecuador caused 16 deaths, among whom was the drug crime boss Leonardo Norero, alias “El Patron.” In Ecuador's state prisons there were numerous bloody clashes between rival groups of prisoners.

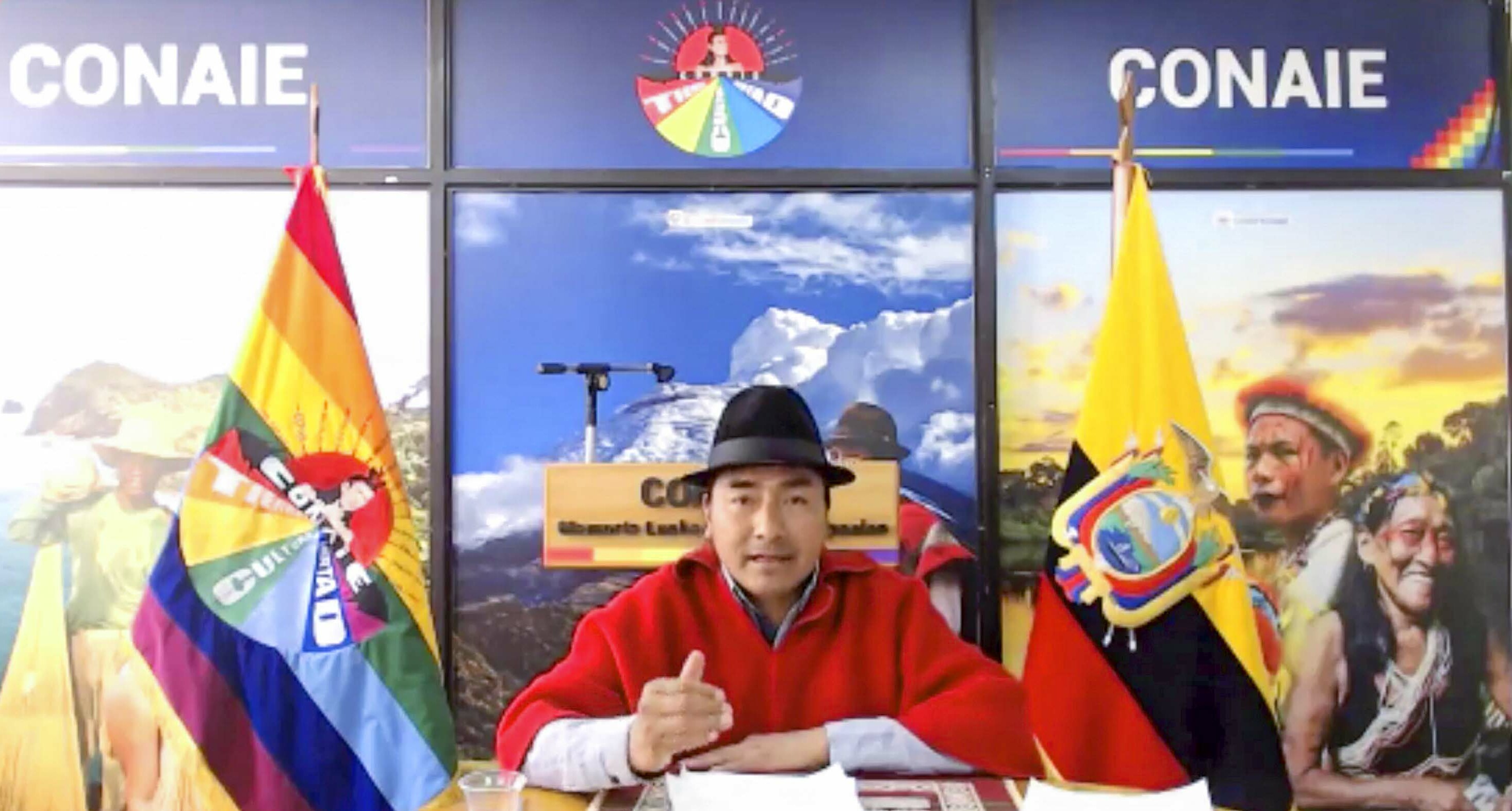
Leonidas Iza, president of CONAIE, a confederation of Ecuadorian Indigenous groups, in 2022

A series of protests against the economic policies of Ecuadorian president Guillermo Lasso, triggered by increasing fuel and food prices, took place in June 2022. Initiated by and primarily attended by Indigenous activists, in particular CONAIE, the protests were later joined by students and workers who were also affected by the price increases. Lasso condemned the protests and labelled them as an attempted "coup d'état" against his government.

As a result of the protests, Lasso declared a state of emergency. When the protests blocked roads and ports in Quito and Guayaquil, there were food and fuel shortages across the country as a result. Lasso was criticized for allowing violent and deadly responses towards protestors. The President narrowly escaped impeachment in a vote in Congress. At the end of June, protesters agreed to end their protests and blockades in return for an agreement by the government to discuss and try to address their demands.

Lasso proposed a series of constitutional changes to enhance his government's ability to respond to rising, largely drug-related crime. In a referendum in February 2023, voters overwhelmingly rejected his proposed changes. This result weakened Lasso's political standing. Meanwhile, Lasso's government faced accusations of corruption. Citing those accusations and claiming that the government had failed to meet its demands from June 2022, CONAIE called on Lasso to resign and declared itself in a state of "permanent mobilization", threatening additional protests.

In a bid to avoid impeachment after the opposition-controlled national assembly accused him of impeachment, Lasso triggered a provision in the Ecuadorian constitution, called "Muertaza Cruzada", which triggered both presidential and parliamentary elections. He moved to rule by decree and promised to hold fresh elections within six months. Military leadership of the country promised to back him. Lasso's move was condemned by opposition figures, including ex-president Rafael Correa and Leonidas Iza It was initially thought that Lasso would be a contender in the elections, but he later informed that he was not going to be a candidate.

On 15 October 2023, center-right candidate Daniel Noboa won the run-off of the premature presidential election with 52.3% of the vote against leftist candidate Luisa González. On 23 November 2023, Daniel Noboa was sworn in as Ecuador's new president.

On 7 January 2024, Los Choneros leader José Adolfo Macías Villamar, alias "Fito", escaped from prison in the city of Guayaquil, on the day of his scheduled transfer to a maximum-security prison. The events were reported the next day by authorities, with charges being filed against two prison guards. Following the escape, Noboa declared a state of emergency, to last for 60 days, giving authorities the power to suspend people's rights and allowing the military to be mobilized inside prisons. Riots ensued in multiple prisons across Ecuador. Two days later, mass armed attacks occurred throughout the country, including armed groups storming a television broadcasting station mid-air. On 23 March 2024, Ecuador's youngest mayor, 27-year-old Brigitte García, mayor of San Vicente for the opposition The Citizens' Revolution, was shot dead. In April 2025, President Daniel Noboa won the run-off round of Ecuador's presidential election, meaning he will now serve a full four-year term. In June 2025, the powerful Ecuadorean gang leader "Fito" was recaptured and he was extradited to the US to face charges of drug and arms trafficking. In October 2025, five people were arrested following an alleged assassination attempt on President Daniel Noboa. In November 2025, the leader of Los Lobos, one of Ecuador's biggest drug-trafficking gangs, Wilmer "Pipo" Chavarria, was captured in Spain.

== See also ==
- 1830 Constitution of Ecuador
- 2008 Constitution of Ecuador
- Economic history of Ecuador
- History of Latin America
- History of South America
- History of the Americas
- Military history of Ecuador
- Politics of Ecuador
- President of Ecuador
- Spanish colonization of the Americas
