= 2020 in Ecuador =

- Decades: 2000s; 2010s; 2020s
- See also: Other events of 2020; Timeline of Ecuadorian history

Events in the year 2020 in Ecuador.

== Incumbents ==
- President: Lenín Moreno
- Vice President:
  - Otto Sonnenholzner (until 10 July)
  - María Alejandra Muñoz (from 22 July)

== Events ==
- February 3 – President Lenin Moreno apologizes after saying women only file harassment claims when "they come from an ugly person" on January 31.
- February 20 - The national electoral tribunal ruled that Evo Morales was ineligible to run for Senate.
- February 29 – COVID-19 pandemic in Ecuador: The Health Ministry reports the first confirmed case of COVID-19 in the country, a woman who entered the country from Spain.
- April 1 – COVID-19 pandemic: Guayaquil, Guayas Province, reports 60 deaths and 1,937 confirmed cases of COVID-19, one of the highest figures in the world.
- April 7 – Former president Rafael Correa (2007-2017) and vice president Jorge Glas were sentenced to eight years in prison for bribery during the period 2012-2016. The accusations are related to the Odebrecht company.
- August 7 – The Navy warns about possible incursions by the Chinese fishing fleet just outside the exclusive economic zone around the Galápagos Islands.
- August 17 – Galapagos National Park authorities say 30 new species of invertebrates in deep water surrounding the Galapagos Islands have been discovered.
- August 21 – COVID-19 pandemic: There are confirmed positive cases in all 24 provinces, with Quito being the hardest-hit area. According to "Compassion Ecuador," the indigenous population is particularly vulnerable.
- August 25 – COVID-19 pandemic: 100,000 confirmed cases and 6,000 deaths across the country.

=== Sports ===
- July 24 to August 9 – Ecuador is scheduled to compete at the 2020 Summer Olympics in Tokyo. (Rescheduled for August 2021)

== Deaths ==
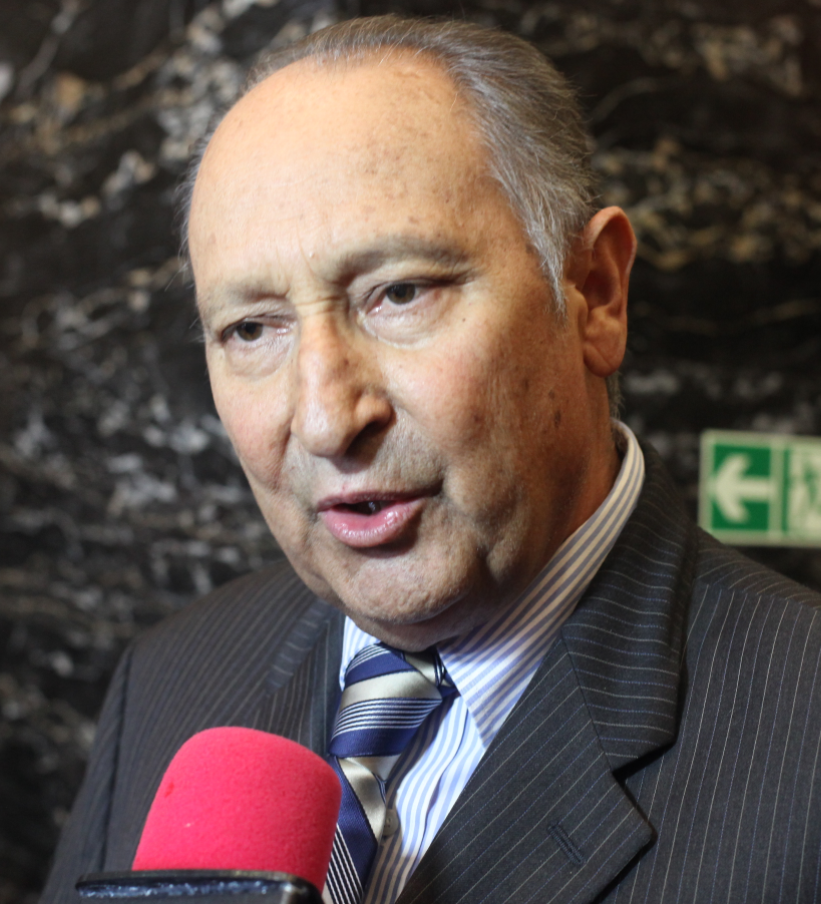
Oswaldo Larriva

- 6 January – Oswaldo Larriva, academic and politician (b. 1946).
- March 30
  - Ángel Sánchez Mendoza, journalist; COVID-19
  - Jorge Chica, 68, footballer and neurosurgeon; COVID-19
  - Manuel Adolfo Varas, 76, broadcaster and sports journalist; COVID-19
- April 2 – Rodrigo Pesántez Rodas, 82, writer and poet; COVID-19
- April 3 – Omar Quintana, 76, politician and sports executive, president of C.S. Emelec; COVID-19
- April 4
  - Carlos González-Artigas, 72, businessperson; COVID-19
  - Giovanni Coppiano, 54, doctor and clown; COVID-19
- April 5 – Carlos González-Artigas, 72, businessman; COVID-19
- April 9 – Roberto Román Valencia, 75, journalist; COVID-19
- April 13 – José Marroquín Yerovi, 76, priest; COVID-19
- April 15 – Augusto Itúrburu, 40, sports journalist; COVID-19
