= 2024 in Ecuador =

- Decades: 2000s; 2010s; 2020s
- See also: Other events of 2024; Timeline of Ecuadorian history

Events in the year 2024 in Ecuador.

== Incumbents ==
- President: Daniel Noboa
- Vice President: Verónica Abad Rojas

== Events ==
=== January ===
- 9 January – 2024 conflict in Ecuador: President Daniel Noboa declares a state of emergency following the escape of José Adolfo Macías Villamar, leader of the Los Choneros drug cartel, from prison. The gangsters storm a TC Televisión newsroom in Guayaquil and launch a series of riots, kidnappings and explosions across the country.
- 11 January – Researchers discover the Upano Valley sites, a network of ancient cities that is the oldest known settlement in the Amazon.
- 14 January – 2024 Ecuadorian conflict: All 178 prison employees held hostage in at least seven prisons are released.
- 15 January – Forty-three prisoners escape a prison in Esmeraldas.
- 18 January – Public prosecutor Cesar Suarez who was investigating the gang attack on TC Television, is killed.
- 22 January – 68 gang members are arrested after storming a hospital in Yaguachi.

=== February ===
- 7 February – The Supreme Court of Ecuador decriminalizes euthanasia, becoming the second Latin American country to do so.
- 9 February – Naranjal councilwoman Diana Carnero is killed.

=== March ===
- 24 March – San Vicente mayor Brigitte García, the youngest mayor in the country, and one of her advisors are found shot dead in Manabí Province.
- 31 March – Eight people are killed and at least ten others are injured by armed gangs in Guayaquil.

=== April ===
- 4 April – Ecuador orders the expulsion of the Mexican ambassador Raquel Serur Smeke after President Andrés Manuel López Obrador makes comments deemed inappropriate on the effect of the Assassination of Fernando Villavicencio on the 2023 Ecuadorian general election.
- 5 April – Former vice president Jorge Glas is arrested by Ecuadorian police after they raid the Mexican embassy in Quito, where he had sought asylum. In response, Mexico announces that it will break off relations with Ecuador, saying that some its diplomats were injured in the raid.
- 6 April – Nicaragua suspends diplomatic relations with Ecuador following the raid on the Mexican embassy in Quito.
- 16 April – Venezuela closes its diplomatic missions in Ecuador following the raid on the Mexican embassy.
- 21 April – Ecuadorian constitutional referendum: A majority of voters approve proposed constitutional changes by the government.
- 21 April – Cosme Damián Parrales, the director of El Rodeo prison, is assassinated while eating dinner in Portoviejo.
- 27 April – An MI-171-E helicopter of the Ecuadorian Army crashes in Tiwino, Pastaza Province, killing eight people.

=== May ===
- 3 May - One person is killed and several others are injured in a road collision involving five vehicles in Machachi, Pichincha Province.

=== June ===
- 14 June - The National Assembly votes to block an attempt to have Vice President Verónica Abad prosecuted in a corruption case involving her son while she is in office.
- 16 June - 2024 Baños landslide: A landslide caused by heavy rainfall strikes a highway in Baños de Agua Santa, killing at least eight people and injuring 22, with 11 people reported missing.
- 18 June - The Foreign Ministry announces plans to reinstate a visa requirement for travelers from China, citing an increase in irregular migratory flows from the latter country.
- 19 June – A nationwide power outage leaves 17 million people without power.
- 30 June – Fourteen members of the judiciary and other government officials are arrested in nationwide raids on suspicion of producing legal decisions favoring organised crime groups.

=== July ===
- 7 July – A court rules that the rights of the Machángara River, which runs through Quito, had been violated by environmental pollution and orders the government to clean up the river.
- 12 July – A court in Quito sentences Carlos Angulo, the alleged leader of the Los Lobos gang, and Laura Castilla to 34 years' imprisonment for the assassination of Fernando Villavicencio in 2023. Three other accomplices are also sentenced to 12 years' imprisonment.
- 16 July – Authorities discover a shipment of 6.23 tonnes of cocaine hidden underneath bananas aboard a cargo ship docked at Posorja on its way to Germany.

=== August ===
- August 23 - A series of powerful wildfires affect numerous provinces.

=== September ===
- 3 September – Álex Xavier Guevara Angulo, director of the Sucumbíos prison is shot dead after receiving threats from gangs.
- 8–15 September – 53rd International Eucharistic Congress at Quito
- 13 September – María Daniela Icaza, director of the Litoral Penitentiary in Guayaquil, the largest prison in Ecuador, is shot dead in a vehicle by gunmen believed to be working for drug gangs.
- 24–25 September – At least six people are injured in wildfires that break out around Quito. One person is arrested on suspicion of arson.

=== November ===
- 3 November – A truck falls into a ravine along the Paute River in Morona-Santiago Province, killing ten people and leaving one survivor.
- 5 November – Vice President Verónica Abad Rojas is fined $8,500 by the Electoral Disputes Tribunal for premature campaigning when she was a candidate for mayor of Cuenca in 2023.
- 9 November – Verónica Abad Rojas is suspended for 150 days as Vice President on charges of "unjustified abandonment" after she refuses to leave her concurrent position as ambassador to Israel for an ambassadorship to Turkey despite an order from the foreign ministry in September.
- 12 November – At least 17 inmates are killed in a riot inside the Litoral Penitentiary in Guayaquil.

=== December ===
- 1 December – Football star Pedro Perlaza is kidnapped and held hostage. He is released on December 4 after police engage in a firefight with his captors in a jungle near Atcames.
- 23 December – Verónica Abad Rojas is ordered reinstated as Vice President after a judge rules her suspension unconstitutional.
- 31 December – Sixteen soldiers are ordered arrested in connection with the disappearance of four minors in Guayaquil on 8 December who are later found dead in Taura.

== Deaths ==
- 9 January: Diego Gallardo, 31, singer-songwriter, shot
- 17 January: César Suárez, 38, prosecutor
- 7 February: Diana Carnero, 29, politician, shot.
- 9 February: Jenny Estrada, 83, journalist, writer and historian.
- 28 February: Félix Aráuz, 88, painter.
- 12 September: María Daniela Icaza, prison warden, murdered.
- 11 November: Marco Angulo, football player, car crash.
- 26 November: Diana Ruiz, 32, military pilot, crash.

== Holidays ==
- 1 January – New Year's Day
- 12–13 February – Carnival
- 29 March – Good Friday
- 1 May – Labour Day
- 24 May – Battle of Pichincha
- 10 August – National Day Holiday
- 9 October – Independence of Guayaquil
- 1 November – All Souls' Day
- 3 November – Independence of Cuenca
- 25 December – Christmas Day
