= Larriva =

Larriva is a surname. Notable people with the surname include:

- Enriqueta Arvelo Larriva (1886–1962), Venezuelan poet
- Guadalupe Larriva (1956–2007), Ecuadorian politician
- Lastenia Larriva (1848–1924), Peruvian poet, writer, and journalist
- Oswaldo Larriva (1946–2020), Ecuadorian politician
- Rudy Larriva (1916–2010), American animator and director
- Tito Larriva (born 1953), Mexican/American musician and actor
