= List of Barcelona Sporting Club presidents =

Barcelona Sporting Club is an Ecuadorian sports club based in Guayaquil, known best for its professional football team. The current president of Barcelona is Carlos Alfaro Moreno.

== List of chairmen ==
	Name	Years	Notes
1	Carlos García Ríos	1925–27	
2	José Salem Dibo	1927–28	
3	Manuel Díaz-Granados	1928–29	
4	Dantón Suárez	1929–31	
5	Ovidio Ramírez Chacón	1931	
6	Fernando Vicenzini	1931–32	
7	Victoriano Arteaga Martinetti	1932–43	
8	Wilfredo Rumbea León	1943–46, 1952–53	
9	Federico Muñoz Medina	1946–51	
10	Luis Guerrero	1954	
11	Miguel Salem Dibo	1955–57	
12	Eduardo Servigón	1957–58	
13	Luis Falquez	1958	
14	Ernesto Mosquera	1958–60	
15	José Bruno Cavanna	1960	
16	Ernesto Ycaza Morla	1961	
17	Emilio Baquerizo Valenzuela	1962–64	
18	Alfonso Trujillo Bustamante	1965	
19	Rigoberto Aguirre Coello	1966	
20	Galo Roggiero Rolando	1967–70, 1986, 2006–07	
21	Aquiles Alvarez Lértola	1971	
22	Carlos Coello Martínez	1972–73	
23	Luis Martin Rubio	1973	
24	Ottón Morán	1973	
25	Mario Moncayo Merino	1973	
26	Silvio Devotto Passano	1974	
27	Francisco Mena	1975	
28	Nicolás Romero Sangster	1975	
29	Miguel Marchán	1976–77	
30	José Tamariz	1978–82	
31	Isidro Romero Carbo	1982–86, 1990–97, 2005–06	
32	Heinz Moeller Freire	1986–88	
33	Jorge Guzmán Ortega	1988	
34	Octavio Hernández Valarezo	1989	
35	Abdalá Bucaram	1997	
36	Xavier Paulson	1997–98	
37	Jorge Bejarano Orrantia	1999	
38	Miguel Palacios Frugonne	2000–01	
39	Leonardo Bohrer Pons	2002–05	
40	Eduardo Maruri	2007–2010	
41	Juan Carlos Estrada	2011	
42	Alfonso Harb	2011	
43	Antonio Noboa	2011-2015	
44	Jose Francisco Cevallos	2016-2019	
45	Carlos Alfaro Moreno	2020- 2024	
46	Antonio Alvarez	2025 -	
