= 2026 in Ecuador =

- Decades: 2000s; 2010s; 2020s
- See also: Other events of 2026; Timeline of Ecuadorian history

Events in the year 2026 in Ecuador.

== Incumbents ==
- President: Daniel Noboa
- Vice President: Sariha Moya

== Events ==
=== January ===
- 11 January – Five decapitated heads are found hanging from a beach in Puerto López.
- 21–22 January – Ecuador announces a 30% tariff on imports from Colombia, prompting Bogota to impose a retaliatory 30% tariff and suspends sales of electricity to Ecuador, which then leads to Ecuador imposing a tariff on Colombian oil passing through the OCP pipeline.

=== February ===
- 6–22 February – Ecuador at the 2026 Winter Olympics
- 10 February – Eleven people, including Guayaquil mayor Aquiles Alvarez and two of his brothers, including Barcelona S.C. president Antonio Alvarez, are arrested as part of an investigation into money laundering.
- 23 February – Seven people are killed in an attack by gunmen on a property in Manabí Province.

=== March ===
- 2 March – President Noboa announces the beginning of joint anti-narcotics operations with the United States.
- 3 March – Ecuador expels the Cuban ambassador, José María Borja, and his entire diplomatic staff for unspecified reasons.
- 6 March –
  - Cuba closes its embassy in Quito.
  - The United States carries out airstrikes on narcoterrorists in Ecuador at the request of the Ecuadorian government, targeting a camp belonging to a faction of FARC dissidents at the border with Colombia.
- 14 March – The government begins enforcing a curfew from 11:00 p.m. to 5:00 a.m. in the provinces of El Oro, Guayas, Los Ríos, and Santo Domingo de los Tsáchilas to support military operations against criminal organizations.
- 17 March –
  - The government deploys 75,000 soldiers and police officers to several provinces to enforce the curfew.
  - Colombia accuses Ecuador of infiltrating its territory and carrying out an airstrike that killed 27 people along their border.
- 18 March – Ángel Esteban Aguilar Morales aka Lobo Menor, a suspected leader of the Los Lobos gang who is wanted over the assassination of Fernando Villavicencio in 2023, is arrested in Mexico and extradited to Colombia, where he is also wanted on charges of involvement with FARC dissidents.

=== April ===
- 16 April – A bus plunges into a ravine in Molleturo, Azuay, killing 14 people and injuring 29 others.

=== June ===
- 11 June–19 July – Ecuador participates at the 2026 FIFA World Cup
- 14 June – A truck collides with a pickup truck near Zapotal, Santa Elena Canton, killing 12 people and injuring one.
- 17 June – Carlos Alberto Suástegui Villanueva, a suspected leader of a faction of the Los Águilas gang, is shot dead at José Joaquín de Olmedo International Airport in Guayaquil.

=== July ===
- 24 July – The United States imposes a 10% on Ecuador, citing the presence of alleged forced labor in the supply chain.

=== August ===
- 5 August – Israel signs deals to expand counterterrorism cooperation and economic relations with Ecuador.

October

=== October ===
- 17 October – A priest in Guayaquil is killed when a crucifix falls on him while doing church service.

== Holidays ==
- 1 January – New Year's Day
- 16-17 February – Carnival
- 3 April – Good Friday
- 1 May – Labour Day
- 25 May – Battle of Pichincha Holiday
- 26 June – Ecuador World Cup Holiday
- 11 August – National Day Holiday
- 10 October – Independence of Guayaquil
- 1 November – All Souls' Day
- 3 November – Independence of Cuenca
- 25 December – Christmas Day

== Deaths ==
- 10 January – Marco Proaño Maya, 80, politician, three-time deputy.
- 14 February – Marcelo Dotti, 83, politician, deputy (1994–1996, 1998–2006) and Andean parliamentarian (2007).
- 1 June – Raúl Guerrón, 49, footballer (Deportivo Quito, national team).
- 19 August –
  - Michele Sensi-Contugi, 44, businessman, Director General of the National Intelligence Center (CNI) (2024-2026).
  - Stephany Hollihan, 41, fashion designer.
