= Rodrigo Pesántez Rodas =

Ecuadorian poet and writer (1937–2020)

Rodrigo Abelardo Pesántez Rodas
- Born: 25 July 1937; Azogues
- Died: 2 April 2020 (aged 82); Guayaquil

Rodrigo Abelardo Pesántez Rodas (25 July 1937 – 2 April 2020) was an Ecuadorian writer and poet.

== Personal life ==
Pesántez Rodas was born in Azogues. He died on 2 April 2020, in Guayaquil, after contracting COVID-19 during the COVID-19 pandemic in Ecuador.

== Notable works ==
- Visión y revisión de la literatura ecuatoriana (2006)
- Panorama del ensayo en el Ecuador (2019)
- De cuerpo entero: antología poética (2008)
- Presencia de la mujer ecuatoriana en la poesía (1960)
- Poesía de un tiempo (1974)
