= Catalina Andramuño =

Ecuadorian doctor

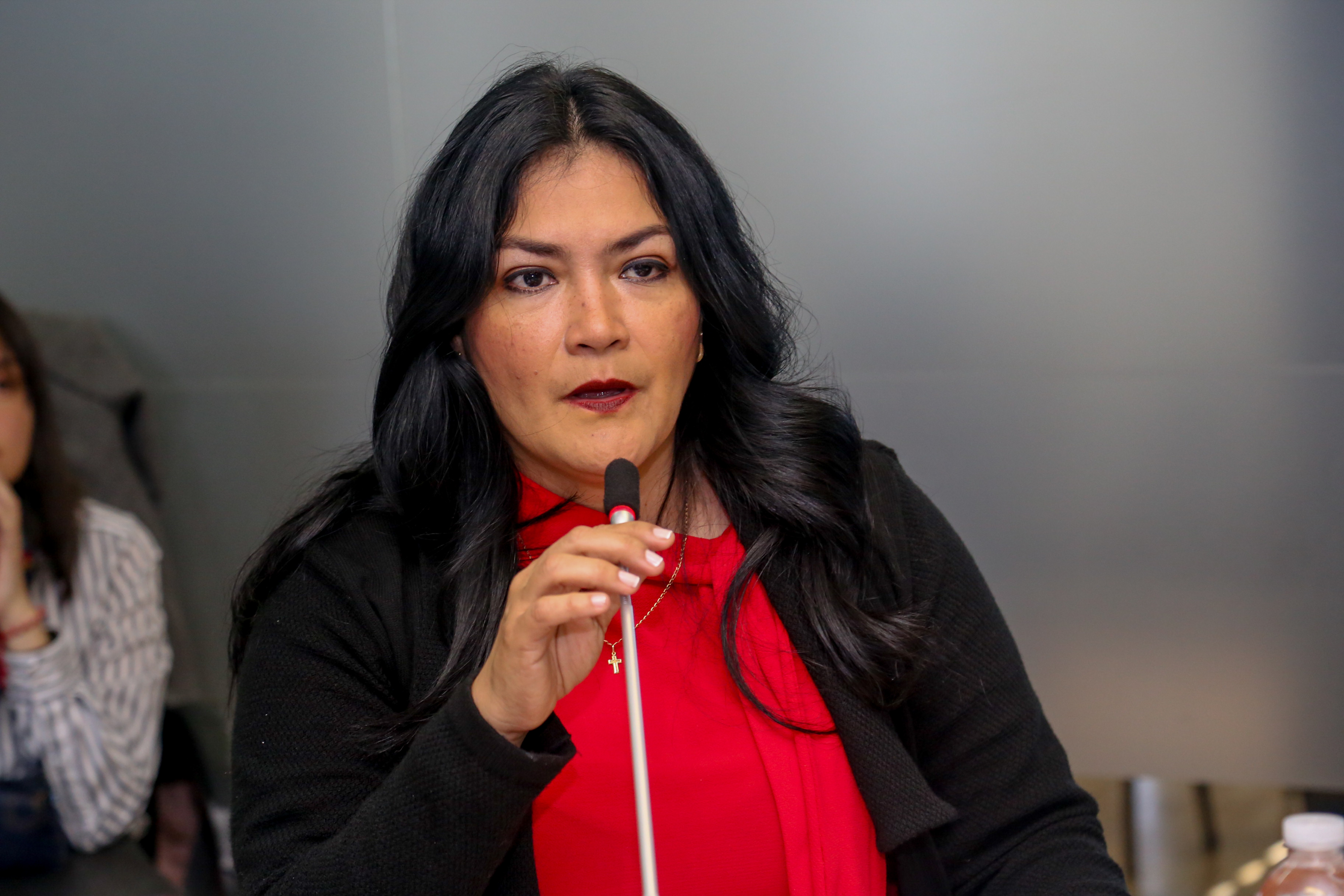

Minister of Public Health
- In office 3 July 2019 – 21 March 2020
- President: Lenín Moreno
- Preceded by: Verónica Espinosa
- Succeeded by: Juan Carlos Zevallos

Personal details
- Born: Catalina Andramuño Zeballos Guayaquil, Ecuador
- Children: JP Torres
- Education: University of Guayaquil; Escuela Superior Politécnica del Litoral
- Occupation: Doctor and magister in health

Catalina Andramuño Zeballos is an Ecuadorian doctor and magister in health who served under the government of Lenín Moreno as Minister of Public Health of Ecuador between 3 July 2019 until 21 March 2020, after which she resigned in the midst of the COVID-19 pandemic.

== Biography ==
Andramuño was born in Guayaquil, Guayas, Ecuador. She studied medicine at the University of Guayaquil, where she also obtained a master's degree in public health; she made a specialty in health management and administration at the Escuela Superior Politécnica del Litoral. Between June 2014 and June 2015, she served as District 9 Health Director.

== Minister of Public Health ==
After the resignation of Verónica Espinosa, the President Lenín Moreno appointed Andramuño as the minister in charge on 3 July 2019, then on 18 October, she was officially designated as the Minister of Public Health.

=== COVID-19 pandemic in Ecuador and resignation ===
On 29 February 2020, Andramuño was in charge of reporting the first case of the COVID-19 disease in Ecuador, which was a case imported from Madrid, Spain. That case was a 71-year-old woman arrived in the country on 14 February who later presented disease-related symptoms. On 21 March, she resigned in the midst of the health emergency. On the same day, Dr. Juan Carlos Zevallos was appointed as the new Minister of Public Health by executive decree 1018 by President Moreno.
