= Carlos González-Artigas =

Ecuadorian businessman (1947–2020)

Carlos González-Artigas Díaz
- Born: 1947; Quito
- Died: 4 April 2020 (aged 72); Guayaquil

Carlos González-Artigas Díaz (1947 - 4 April 2020) was an Ecuadorian businessman.

== Biography ==
González-Artigas was born in Quito, Ecuador and from a young age, as soon as he left school, he began his professional life in commercial and agro-industrial activities related to cotton planting and processing in the Manabí Province, where he remained in Bahía de Caráquez for several years. He received several offers to take over important companies when he was still very young, however he preferred to go his own way in the Oilseed industry.

Later, González-Artigas came to Montecristi, where he founded Grupo Industrial La Fabril, one of the largest industries in the production of oils and cleaning products in Ecuador, which employs approximately two thousand people in Manabí, of which it was its largest shareholder and González-Artigas was their CEO. The main lines of its products are oils and fats for human consumption, both for the food industry and for homes, personal care and home products, with brands distributed in more than 20 countries.

González-Artigas was director of Federación Ecuatoriana de Exportadores (Fedexpor). He was the mentor of the Montecristi Golf Club which opened in 2014. He invested in a farm of coffee, cocoa, soursop and other products, and among his latest investments was a small jam and liquor factory.

== Death ==
He died at the age of 72, from a severe pneumonia allegedly caused by COVID-19 caused by the SARS-CoV-2 virus, during the coronavirus pandemic in Ecuador, on the afternoon of April 4, 2020, at the Kennedy clinic in Guayaquil, where up to that moment more than 2,400 infected people were registered in the city. His company was passed to his son Carlos González-Artigas Loor.
