= San Vicente Canton, Ecuador =

San Vicente Canton
- Canton
- Location of Manabí Province in Ecuador.

- San Vicente Canton in Manabí Province
- Coordinates: 0.5893°S 80.4088°W
- Country: Ecuador
- Province: Manabí Province
- Capital: San Vicente

Area
  - Total: 734.3 km^{2} (283.5 sq mi)

Population (2022 census)
  - Total: 24,997
  - Density: 34.04/km^{2} (88.17/sq mi)
- Time zone: UTC-5 (ECT)

San Vicente Canton is a canton of Ecuador. It is the newest canton in the Manabí Province, having been founded on November 16, 1999, when it was separated from Sucre Canton as a result of citizen procedures. Its capital is the urban parish of San Vicente, while Canoa is the only officially recognized rural parish. Canoa is well known by tourists and foreigners for its good conditions for surfing and paragliding. Another oceanside community, Boca de Briceño, also lies within the canton. Its population at the 2001 census was 19,116. The canton's economy relies on agriculture, livestock, shrimp farming, and tourism.

== Demographics ==
Ethnic groups as of the Ecuadorian census of 2010:

- Mestizo 82.2%
- Afro-Ecuadorian 7.2%
- Montubio 5.8%
- White 4.0%
- Indigenous 0.1%
- Other 0.7%
