= César Suárez (prosecutor) =

Ecuadorian prosecutor and lawyer (1985–2024)

- Born: César Byron Suárez Pilay; 22 May 1985; Paján Canton, Manabí, Ecuador
- Died: 17 January 2024 (aged 38); Guayaquil, Ecuador
- Cause of death: Gunshot wounds
- Occupations: Prosecutor; lawyer

César Byron Suárez Pilay (22 May 1985 – 17 January 2024) was an Ecuadorian prosecutor and lawyer. He was known for investigating several high-profile criminal cases, including the corruption case in Ecuadorian public hospitals, and the TC Televisión channel takeover case during the 2024 Ecuadorian conflict.

== Early life and education ==
César Byron Suárez Pilay was born on 22 May 1985, in Paján Canton, province of Manabí, Ecuador. He completed five academic degrees including master's degrees in Procedural Law, Constitutional Law, Economic Criminal Law, Criminalistics, and Diplomacy.

== Career ==
Suárez began his career in the province of Manabí, obtaining convictions in cases of murder, assassination, and femicide. In the city of Manta, he was in charge of proceedings against drug trafficking gangs, cases delegated by the State Attorney General's Office, in which he prosecuted police officers, lawyers, public officials, and businessmen.

In November 2018, Suárez became part of the Guayas Prosecutor's Office and, as of June 2019, he worked as a Public Administration prosecutor. In 2019, he was part of the investigation for influence peddling against the member and former president of the Council for Citizen Participation and Social Control, priest José Carlos Tuárez Zambrano.

During 2020, Suárez carried out investigations against managers, former officials, and purchasing managers, among other public and private employees, for irregularities and corruption, in crimes of embezzlement and organized crime in the hospital system of the Abel Gilbert Hospital health centers, the IESS Los Ceibos Hospital and the Teodoro Maldonado Carbo Specialty Hospital. In these cases, the former head of public purchases and manager of the Luis Jairala Zambrano Hospital, Jorge Henriques, was involved in million-dollar purchases of overpriced medications, for which was requested a red alert from Interpol to find his whereabouts, and the brothers Noe and Daniel Salcedo Bonilla, who formed a network that illegally marketed medicines donated to social security and the Hospital del Guasmo, during the COVID-19 pandemic. In June 2020, he participated in an investigation into alleged trafficking of assets against former President Abdalá Bucaram and his son Jacobo.

Suárez also investigated the case regarding the death of actor Efraín Ruales in 2021. In 2021, he took part in the investigations of the case of fraud in the funds of the Social Security Institute of the National Police (ISSPOL), for which he requested the immobilization of around two hundred and seventy million dollars in Isspol papers in the Central Bank and Decevale. He participated in the sentencing for terrorism of eight individuals who carried out attacks on gas stations, homes, and Community Police Units, in November 2022, in the city of Durán. In 2024, he was in charge of the case for the armed raid of hooded criminals during a live broadcast on the TC Televisión channel, where he interrogated the 13 defendants.

== Death ==
Suárez was murdered by hitmen in the Los Ceibos sector of Guayaquil on 17 January 2024, with 20 shots. He was 38. This occurred when the prosecutor was going from his home to the Judicial Unit of the Albán Borja Shopping Center, for a hearing for drug trafficking. The day before, he told the newspaper El Universo that he did not assign bodyguards to protect his life. However, the Prosecutor's Office assured Ecuavisa that the prosecutor did have protection, although they did not give details of it.

On 18 January, two suspects were arrested in connection with Suárez's murder. The statement was confirmed by the National Police of Ecuador.
