= Timeline of Quito =

The following is a timeline of the history of the city of Quito, Ecuador.

== Prior to 20th century ==
- 1487 - Incas in power.
- 1527 - "Inka ruler Huayna Capac dies in Quito along with an estimated 200,000 of his subjects" (approximate date).
- 1533 - Quito "burnt by Ruminahui."
- 1534 - "Spanish soldiers, led by Sebastián de Belalcázar, defeat the Inka in Quito. They name the town Villa de San Francisco de Quito."
- 1535
  - Art school founded.
  - Construction of Monastery of St. Francis begins (approximate date).
- 1541 - Quito attains Spanish colonial city status.
- 1545 - Catholic Diocese of Quito established.
- 1548 - Quito becomes part of the Viceroyalty of Peru.
- 1551 - Colegio de San Juan Evangelista established (approximate date).
- 1563 - Spanish colonial Audiencia of Quito established.
- 1592-1593 - Economic unrest.
- 1613 - Church of the Society of Jesus building opens.
- 1718 - Quito becomes part of Viceroyalty of New Granada.
- 1735 - Earthquake.
- 1765
  - Quito Revolt.
  - Church of the Society of Jesus building completed.
- 1797 - Earthquake.
- 1810 - Carondelet Palace built.
- 1822 - May 24: Battle of Pichincha.
- 1829 - Quito becomes capital of Ecuador.
- 1859 - Earthquake.
- 1865 - Guayaquil-Quito railway built (approximate date).
- 1875 - August 6: Assassination of president Garcia Moreno.
- 1880 - Teatro Nacional Sucre opens.

== 20th century ==
- 1906
  - El Comercio newspaper begins publication.
  - Chamber of Commerce established.
  - Population: 50,840.
- 1914 - Teatro Variedades (Quito) opens.
- 1930 - LDU Quito football club formed.
- 1932 - Estadio El Ejido (stadium) opens.
- 1933 - Teatro Bolivar opens.
- 1937 - Teatro Capitol built.
- 1938 - Últimas Noticias (Ecuador) newspaper begins publication.
- 1950 - Population: 209,932.
- 1951 - Estadio Olímpico Atahualpa (stadium) opens.
- 1955 - Deportivo Quito football club formed.
- 1960 - Mariscal Sucre Airport begins operating.
- 1972 - Population: 564,900 (approximate).
- 1978 - Historic Center of Quito designated a UNESCO World Heritage Site.
- 1982
  - Hoy and La Hora newspapers begin publication.
  - Population: 866,472.
- 1990
  - May: Indigenous rights demonstration.
  - Population: 1,100,847.
- 1992
  - September: Economic unrest.
  - Botanical Garden of Quito established.
  - Jamil Mahuad becomes mayor.
  - Coliseo General Rumiñahui (arena) built.
- 1994 - Estadio Chillogallo (stadium) opens.
- 1995 - January: Economic protest.
- 1996 - March: Labor strike.
- 1997
  - February: Anti-Bucaram demonstration.
  - September: Indigenous rights rally.
  - Casa Blanca stadium opens.
- 1999 - February 17: Assassination of politician Jaime Hurtado.
- 2000
  - January: Indigenous rights demonstration.
  - Paco Moncayo becomes mayor.

== 21st century ==
- 2001 - January: Indigenous rights demonstration.
- 2006 - Quito TV begins broadcasting.
- 2008 - Teatro México opens.
- 2009 - Andrés Vallejo becomes mayor, succeeded by Augusto Barrera.
- 2011 - Mashpi Rainforest Biodiversity Reserve established near city.
- 2013 - New Mariscal Sucre International Airport opens.
- 2014 - Mauricio Rodas becomes mayor.
- 2015 - September: Forest fire.
- 2016
  - October: United Nations Conference on Housing and Sustainable Urban Development held in Quito.
  - Population: 1,778,434.
- 2019 - May: Ground broken for LDS Quito Ecuador Temple.

== See also ==
- Quito history
- Urban evolution of colonial Quito
- History of Quito
- List of mayors of Quito

== Bibliography ==
- W. B. Stevenson (1825). "Quito". Historical and Descriptive Narrative of 20 Years' Residence in South America. London: Hurst, Robinson, and Co.
- José Toribio Medina (1904). La imprenta en Quito (1760-1818) (in Spanish). Santiago de Chile: Imprenta Elzeviriana – via HathiTrust. (Annotated list of titles published in Quito, arranged chronologically)
- "Quito" . Encyclopædia Britannica. Vol. 22 (11th ed.). 1910.
- A.A. MacErlean (1911). "Quito". Catholic Encyclopedia. New York.
- Nicholas P. Cushner (1982). Farm and Factory: The Jesuits and the Development of Agrarian Capitalism in Colonial Quito. State University of New York Press. ISBN 978-0-87395-570-6.
- Metropolitan Planning and Management in the Developing World: Abidjan and Quito. Nairobi: United Nations Centre for Human Settlements (Habitat). 1991. ISBN 92-1-131180-2.
- Kris E. Lane (2002). Quito 1599: City and Colony in Transition. University of New Mexico Press. ISBN 978-0-8263-2357-6.
- "Quito". Understanding Slums: Case Studies for the Global Report 2003. United Nations Human Settlements Programme and University College London. 2003.
- David Marley (2005). "Quito". Historic Cities of the Americas: An Illustrated Encyclopedia. ABC-CLIO. ISBN 978-1-57607-027-7.
