= José Marroquín Yerovi =

Ecuadorian priest (1943–2020)

José Marroquín Yerovi (Quito, 15 November 1943 – Guayaquil, 13 April 2020) was an Ecuadorian priest.

== Biography ==
He was born in Quito, Ecuador, on November 15, 1943, in a family with Christian roots; he had five siblings. In 1966 he graduated in engineering at the National Polytechnic School.

He joined Opus Dei in 1970, and moved to Rome shortly thereafter, to study theology and live close to the founder of Opus Dei, Josemaría Escrivá. He studied at the University of Navarra, where he graduated in 1974 and obtained a doctorate in Theology. He was ordained a priest in 1978.

In 1980, he returned to Ecuador and performed many priestly tasks, where he spent thirty years at the Intisana school in Quito, where thousands of students received the sacraments from his hand, and hundreds of families and teachers received his spiritual guidance.

In 2009, he traveled to Guayaquil, where he remained for ten years as parish priest of the San Josemaría Escrivá Rectoral Church, located at km 7.5 of Samborondón avenue, and worked as Chaplain at the Delta Women's College. In 2017, together with the parishioners of the San Josemaría Church, he carried out the Nuevo Amanecer project, for the construction of a parish for the residents of Socio Vivienda I and II, since the priest of the parish officiates masses in that place after the visit of Pope Francis in 2015, using metal structures with beams that were used during the Pope's ceremony in the Parque Samanes.

On December 17, 2018, during a solemn ceremony celebrated by the mayor of Samborondón, José Yúnez, for the anniversary of the creation of La Puntilla, Marroquín was awarded the Reconocimiento al Mérito Humanístico.

== Death ==
While hospitalized for a long illness, Marroquín contracted COVID-19 during the pandemic in Ecuador. In the morning of 13 April 2020, he died of complications from COVID-19 caused by the SARS-CoV-2 virus in the Alcívar Clinic, at the age of 76, having received the holy sacraments and the apostolic blessing, as reported in a web communication from the regional vicar of the Prelature of Opus Dei in Ecuador. His death was reported by the Archdiocese of Guayaquil. The Archbishop of Guayaquil, Luis Cabrera Herrera, stated that Marroquín was the second priest to die of the new coronavirus.
