= Roberto Román Valencia =

Ecuadorian lawyer and sports journalist (1945–2020)

Roberto Román Valencia (10 February 1945 – 9 April 2020) was an Ecuadorian lawyer and sports journalist, known as El Fantasma ("the ghost"), who had a long career in sports journalism in the written press, radio and television, for fifty years.

== Biography ==
He practiced sports journalism in various media, and was a lawyer by profession, as well as Technical Director. He was President of the Coaches Association and Director of the Out of Field (Fuera del Campo) Program (Founded on January 3, 1983).

As a journalist, he worked as editor of Diario Extra for sixteen years. He worked in TV channels such as Sucre TV and America Visión, and online media such as America Visión and Perla Canal with the La Cancha program, Simulcastpro and Fuera del Campo TV (of which he was co-owner) with the Fuera de Campo TV program with Victor Garces, Aquilino Carrera, Xavier Coello, Martin de la Torre and Janio Pinto.

He worked as a sports commentator on various radio stations in Guayaquil, such as Caravana AM 750, Sucre Radio y TV, Radio Atalaya 680 AM, Radio Universal, and La Redonda, his last station, where he hosted the radio program Fuera del Campo.

He was a member of the sports team that would make up El Canal del Fútbol, but this did not materialize due to the state of emergency that was declared in Ecuador in early 2020 as a consequence of the COVID-19 pandemic.

== Death ==
Román fell ill on 21 March 2020, during the COVID-19 pandemic in Ecuador. As he was unable to find a place in a hospital due to the collapse of the health system in Guayaquil, his daughter Paola had to look for two portable oxygen tanks to help him breathe. On April 8 it was reported that he urgently needed medicines, but fourteen hours later, on April 9, he died of respiratory complications due to COVID-19, at the age of 75.
