= Giovanni Coppiano =

Ecuadorian radiologist and clown (1965–2020)

Giovanni José Coppiano Campoverde (13 September 1965 – 5 April 2020) was an Ecuadorian medical technologist in radiology and clown, best known for giving life to the clown Copito, who was a pioneer in children's entertainment nationwide.

== Biography ==
Coppiano studied at the Vicente Rocafuerte National College in Guayaquil. His passion for medicine led him to graduate as a medical technologist in radiology and a degree in imaging. He was Master in Health Services Management. He worked since 1998, in the imaging area of the Dr. Roberto Gilbert Elizalde Children's Hospital.

His love for children not only led him to work in children's hospitals, but also made him a pioneer in children's entertainment, being a clown, creating shows such as Copito the Clown; along with adolescent dancers, called Copito and his Cheercopidance, he held family events and children's parties for patients of the children's hospital with the company he created, called Copito Music Events.

He was part of children's Christmas events for the Roberto Gilbert Children's Hospital, when Coppiano and the physiotherapists Holger Potes and Rosita Triana developed, together with the hospital directors, the event "Por una Sonrisa", together with the Junta de Beneficiencia de Guayaquil.

== Death ==
Coppiano died in Guayaquil on April 5, 2020, at the age of 54, from complications of COVID-19 caused by the SARS-CoV-2 virus during the pandemic in Ecuador. Owing to the collapse of the health system caused by the pandemic, he had been unable to find care in hospital.
