= Brigitte García =

Ecuadorian politician (1997–2024)

Mayor of San Vicente
- In office May 2023 – 23 March 2024

Personal details
- Born: Melany Brigitte García Farías; 27 January 1997 Canoa, Ecuador
- Died: 23 March 2024 (aged 27) San Vicente, Ecuador
- Cause of death: Assassination by shooting
- Party: Citizen Revolution Movement
- Occupation: Politician, nurse, social worker

Melany Brigitte García Farías (27 January 1997 – 23 March 2024) was an Ecuadorian politician, nurse, and social worker who served as mayor of San Vicente from May 2023 until her assassination. She was a member of the left-wing Citizen Revolution Party.

On 23 March 2024, García was shot and killed, along with an aide. At the time of her death, she was the youngest mayor in Ecuador at 27 years old.

== Biography ==
Melany Brigitte García Farías was born on 27 January 1997 in Canoa. She was an educated nurse. At the age of 15, García worked for a health services company. She ran for mayor of San Vicente, at the age of 26, in February 2023, as a member of the left-wing Citizen Revolution Party. She was elected with 4,943 votes (37.48%) in a field of 8 candidates, taking office in May 2023.

=== Tenure ===
García focused on improving the quality of drinking water, installing sewers, and boosting local tourism through beaches. She also indicated that she planned to develop agriculture and the fishing industry in the region.

== Death ==
During the late evening of 23 March 2024, García was gunned down alongside her director of communications, Jairo Loor Meza, in a vehicle. She was 27. During the evening of 23 March, her family raised concerns as to her whereabouts. The bodies were found on 24 March at 1 am.

According to an autopsy they were killed on 23 March at around 11 pm, and according to police sources, they were shot from the backseat of a car in the neck and head. Jairo Loor Meza was shot first. They were both found to have had been shot multiple times.

Local media indicate that previously there had been no indications of threats and that the mayor did not have any police protection. The killing followed on other violence against political figures in the area and the country.

== See also ==
- 2024 Ecuadorian conflict
- Diana Carnero
