= Verónica Espinosa =

María Verónica Espinosa Serrano
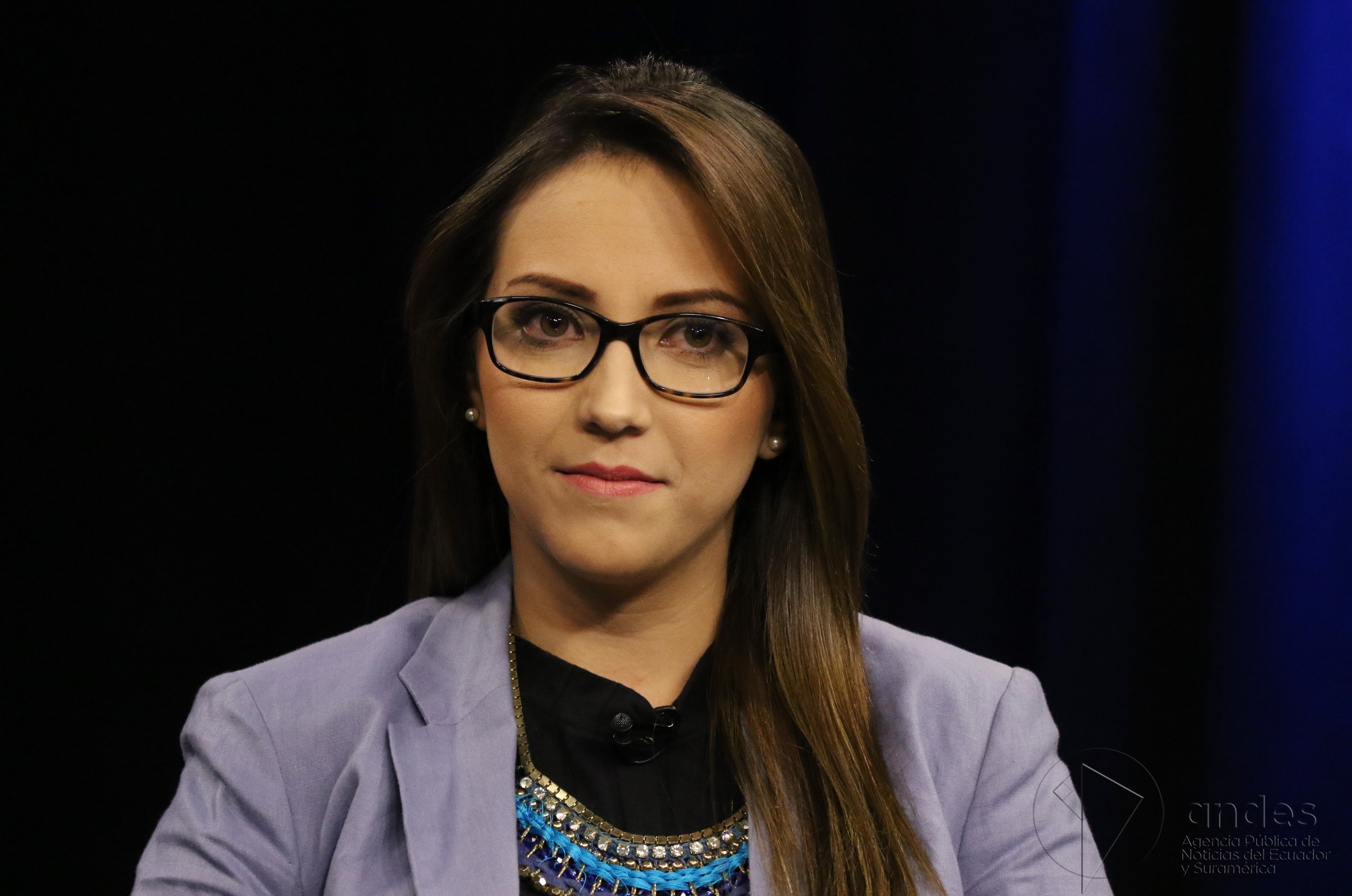

Minister of Public Health
- In office 6 January 2017 – 3 July 2019
- President: Lenín Moreno
- Preceded by: Margarita Guevara
- Succeeded by: Catalina Andramuño

Personal details
- Education: Universidad Internacional del Ecuador

Dr María Verónica Espinosa Serrano is an Ecuadorian medical doctor who served as the Minister of Public Health of Ecuador from 2017 to 2019, as Viceminister of Governance and Health Surveillance, and previously as National Undersecretary of Health Governance. She is recognized for her leadership in consolidating Ecuador's community-based primary health care model and for her role in positioning Ecuador as a regional leader in global health governance, including as the architect of the Sustainable Health Agenda for the Americas (SHAA) 2018–2030. She left her role in 2019 with thanks, but after some discussion over the short supply of some drugs.

== Education and early career ==
Espinosa studied medicine at Universidad Internacional del Ecuador, where she received a full academic merit scholarship. She completed her rotational internship at the Carlos Andrade Marin Hospital and subsequently participated in the Erasmus Mundus Programme at the Université Pierre et Marie Curie (La Pitié-Salpêtrière) in Paris, France. She holds a master's degree in Public Health from the Universidad San Francisco de Quito, and a Diploma in Sexual and Reproductive Health and Rights from the Universidad ISalud in Argentina.

Her early professional career included positions as Director of the Puembo Health Sub-Center, as acting Coordinador of the Health Area No. 14 in Yaruqui, and as Medical Director at Laboratorios LIFE C.A. She subsequently joined the Ministry of Public Health as adviser before being appointed as Undersecretary, Viceminister and Minister roles.

== Professional career ==
=== National Undersecretary of Health Governance (c. 2013 - 2015) ===
Espinosa served as National Undersecretary of Health Governance (Subsecretaria Nacional de Gobernanza de la Salud Pública) within the Ministry of Public Health, the unit responsible for directing health policy frameworks, national medicines regulation, normative instruments, and the governance of the National Health System. In this capacity, she served as President of the National Council for the Setting and Review of Prices of Medicines for Human Use and Consumption, overseeing pharmaceutical pricing policy across the public health system. She also served as the Ministry's delegate to the Board of Directors of the Ecuadorian Institute of Intelectual Property (IEPI), and as the Ministry's representative on the Board of Directors of the Society to fight against cancer (SOLCA).

During that period, in the area of access to medicines, Espinosa led an international forum in Quito on generic medicines policy, convening the Pan American Health Organization (PAHO), the United Nations Population Fund (UNFPA), and the Superintendency of Market Control, affirming generic medicines as a cornerstone of Universal Health Coverage (UHC).

Her tenure coincided with a period of significant international positioning for Ecuador in global health governance. During this period, Ecuador was elected as a member of the PAHO Executive Committee (2013-2016), designated as President of the 52nd PAHO Directing Council (2013-2014), elected to the PAHO Sub-Committee on Program, Budget and Administration (2015-2016), and designated as President of the PAHO Executive Committee (2015-2016).

=== Viceminister of Governance and Health Surveillance (c. 2016 - January 2017) ===
Espinosa served as Viceminister of Health Governance and Health Surveillance, the second-ranking authority in the Ministry, directly overseeing the Undersecretary of Health Governance and the Undersecretary of Health Surveillance. In this role, she directed the national regulatory framework for pharmaceutical access, epidemiological surveillance, health facilities certification, governance of the national health system and, among other, compliance with Ecuador's obligations under the International Health Regulations (IHR).

In August 2016, Espinosa signed the sanitary standard for the national certification of Establecimientos Amigos de la Madre y el Niño (Mother and Child Friendly Health Facilities), establishing binding norms for protecting, promoting, and supporting breastfeeding in both public and private health facilities across the country.

She continued to chair the National Council of Medicine Pricing and contributed to preparatory work for the Sustainable Health Agenda for the Americas (SHAA) 2018-2030, which Ecuador would subsequently lead formally at the regional level.

=== Minister of Public Health (January 2017 - June 2019) ===
Espinosa was appointed Minister of Public Health on 5 January 2017, replacing the outgoing minister Margarita Guevara. Shortly after taking office, Espinosa issued the National Medicines Policy 2017-2021, establishing the regulatory framework governing pharmaceutical access, pricing, and availability across all levels of the national health system, implemented through the Undersecretary of Health Governance and the Directorate of Medicines and Medical Devices.

In the same year, she led the launch of the merit-based competitive examination process to hire more than 3,700 nurses and doctors for primary care services, approved 560 scholarships for medical specialists training, and led the negotiation of the updated collective bargaining agreement that benefited more than 17,000 health workers.

By end 2018, 47 million healthcare services and medical consultations were provided by the Ministry of Public health, concentrating 63% of the annual national provision in the country and new health facilities at the primary, secondary and tertiary levels of care were built, including 12 new health centers, and 2 hospitals.

In the area of health promotion, through the implementation of the Sexual and Reproductive Health Plan 2017-2021, 657 health facilities were certified as inclusive facilities. The Ministry of Public Health also approved the Ecuadorian Inter-sectorial Nutrition Plan (PIANE), and 168 municipalities adhered the emblematic program "Healthy Municipalities" (Municipios Saludables).

She designed and scaled up the Médico del Barrio (Neighborhood Doctor) program, a community-based, intercultural health model targeting priority and vulnerable populations, oriented towards a preventive and health-promotion approach. By May 2019, the strategy had been implemented in 180 cantons, with visits to more than 15,000 neighborhoods and coverage of over 300 thousand homes. She also led the launch of the national strategy Tu bebé sin VIH: hazte la prueba, a campaign to end the VIH transmission from mother to child.

Espinosa led dialogue with the National Assembly's Commission on the Right to Health, calling on legislators to support the proposal of the Organic Health Code (COS) as the most consequential regulatory framework in the history of Ecuador's National Health System.

== Contribution to regional and global health ==
=== World Health Organization and Pan American Health Organization ===
In May 2017, Espinosa led Ecuador's official delegation to the World Health Assembly (WHA) in Geneva, where she engaged in negotiations on nutrition and childhood obesity, communicable and non-communicable diseases, medicines, vaccination, health workforce reform, and the reform of the World Health Organization itself. On the margins of the WHA she held bilateral ministerial working meetings with Panama on food labeling policy, with Argentina on pharmaceutical traceability mechanisms, and with Colombia on emergency health care for Ecuadorian nationals in Colombian territory. She also participated in the high-level panel on the International Health Regulations (IHR) and the implications of the Global Health Security Agenda. At the WHA, Espinosa chaired the PAHO Heads of Delegation meeting, where she presented the draft of the Sustainable Health Agenda for the Americas (SHAA) 2018 - 2030 to all 44 member countries of the region.

In September 2017, Espinosa participated in the 29th Pan American Sanitary Conference of PAHO, where she delivered the final ASSA 2030 proposal in her capacity as chair of the 16-country working group that had developed the document. The agenda was approved unanimously by the conference participants and defined 11 objectives and 60 targets to guide the regional health strategies and interventions through 2030, reaffirming health as a right, Pan American solidarity, equity, universality, and social inclusion. Espinosa described it as "the highest-level health policy and strategic planning framework in the Americas". In the same conference, Ecuador received WHO certification as an Emergency Medical Team Level II (EMT II), becoming the first country in the region and the sixth globally to achieve this designation.

She advocated for the right to access to health for migrants. On the margins of the 72nd World Health Assembly, she participated in a side event titled "Migration: Challenges, Commitment to health, and Solidarity", where she emphasized "Guaranteeing the right to health to migrants is entirely consistent with the law in this country. To us, health is not a commodity, it’s a human right”.

=== UNASUR South American Health Council ===
In March 2017, Espinosa presented and secured approval of the Declaration on Minimum Standards for Emergency Medical Teams (EMT) at the X Meeting of UNASUR's South American Health Council, establishing a regional standard for the emergency health capacity in the region.

=== World Health Summit ===
In 2018, Espinosa was invited to participate in the 10th World Health Summit in Berlin, where she addressed before approximately 2,000 global health experts and leaders, with a presentation titled "Health Systems in Latin America: Achieving Health for All". Her presentation covered 20 years of regional challenges and achievements across epidemiological, economic, social, gender, ethnic, and geographical dimensions, with particular focus on Ecuador's community health model (Médico del Barrio) and the food traffic-light labelling system as replicable policy innovations. She also joined WHO Director-General Dr Tedros Adhanom Ghebreyesus in the high-level panel "The SDG3 Global Action Plan for Health and Well-being", where she highlighted the Health Agenda of the Americas and called for multi-sectoral global health action.

== Bilateral Health Diplomacy ==
Espinosa co-chaired the Ecuador-Colombia Binational Ministers of Health meeting with her Colombian counterpart, Dr Juan Pablo Uribe, coordinating epidemiological surveillance, vector-borne disease control, sexual health services, vaccination campaigns, and health assistance to migrants transiting the shared border. The meeting produced a joint health roadmap and laid the basis for a new Binational Five-Year Health Plan incorporating human mobility as a structural priority.

In 2019, in response to the Venezuelan migration health emergency, the Ministry under Espinosa launched a campaign to provide over 48,000 vaccinations at the northern border entry points. The approach included the establishment of a humanitarian corridor that guaranteed health services for migrants throughout the country, and Ecuador was recognized by the Pan American Health Organization and the European Civil Protection and Humanitarian Aid Operations (ECHO) for the healthcare provided to migrants in the country.

== Recognition ==
In November 2018, the global governance network Apolitical included Espinosa on its list of "100 Future Leaders: The World's Most Influential Young People in Government", a ranking compiled from hundreds of nominations by national governments, international organizations and academic institutions including the United Nations, Harvard University and Georgetown University.
