= Tony Alvarez =

Tony Alvarez may refer to:

- El Potro Álvarez (born 1979), Venezuelan former baseball player and politician
- Tony Alvarez (actor) (1956–1997), Spanish-born actor resident in Australia
- Tony Álvarez (Cuban singer) (1918–2001), Cuban television singer and actor

== See also ==
- Antonio Álvarez (disambiguation)
