= 2025 in Ecuador =

- Decades: 2000s; 2010s; 2020s
- See also: Other events of 2025; Timeline of Ecuadorian history

Events in the year 2025 in Ecuador.

== Incumbents ==
- President: Daniel Noboa
- Vice President: Verónica Abad Rojas (until 24 May), Sariha Moya (starting 24 May)

== Events ==
=== January ===
- 2 January — President Daniel Noboa appoints Planning Minister Sariha Moya as interim vice president.
- 31 January — A magnitude 5.5 earthquake hits Napo Province, injuring three people.

=== February ===
- 3 February — President Noboa announces a 27% tariff on Mexican imports.
- 9 February — 2025 Ecuadorian general election (first round): No candidate fails to win a majority in the presidential election, with incumbent president Noboa winning at least 44.6% of the vote followed by Luisa González at 44.02%.

=== March ===
- 14 March — An environmental emergency is declared in Esmeraldas Province after an oil spill in the Esmeraldas River caused by a landslide rupturing a segment of the Trans-Ecuadorian Pipeline System.
- 19 March — A suspension bridge collapses into the Magro River near Guayaquil, bringing down seven vehicles and killing four people.

=== April ===
- 12 April — President Noboa imposes a state of emergency in Quito, Camilo Ponce Enriquez, the provinces of Guayas, Los Rios, Manabi, Santa Elena, El Oro, Orellana and Sucumbios and in all prisons nationwide, citing an increase in criminal activities.
- 13 April — 2025 Ecuadorian general election (second round): Incumbent president Daniel Noboa is re-elected for a second term.
- 17 April — Twelve people are killed in a gun attack on a cockfighting ring in La Valencia, Manabí Province.
- 23 April — Emelec footballer Jackson Rodríguez escapes a kidnapping attempt at his home in Guayaquil. His wife and son, who are abducted, are rescued the next day.
- 25 April — A magnitude 6.3 earthquake hits off the coast of Esmeraldas Province, destroying multiple buildings in the area and injuring 20 people.

=== May ===
- 9 May — Eleven soldiers are killed in an attack by FARC dissidents in Orellana Province.
- 24 May — Daniel Noboa is inaugurated for a second term as president.
- 26 May — A major fire breaks out at Petroecuador's main refinery in Esmeraldas Province, injuring five people.
- 31 May — The government issues a public apology for the abuse of workers at an abaca plantation run by the Japanese Furukawa Group in Santo Domingo de los Tsachilas Province from 1963 to 2019.

=== June ===
- 10 June – Ecuador qualifies for the 2026 FIFA World Cup after a 0-0 draw against Peru at the 2026 FIFA World Cup qualification in Lima.
- 20 June – Federico Gómez Quintín, the leader of the Los Águilas gang, escapes from the Litoral Penitentiary in Guayaquil.
- 25 June – José Adolfo Macías Villamar, the leader of the Los Choneros gang, is recaptured in Manta following his 2024 prison escape.
- 30 June – Former vice president Jorge Glas is sentenced to 13 years' imprisonment for embezzling public funds related to recovery efforts following the 2016 Ecuador earthquake.

=== July ===
- 19 July – Nine people are killed in a shooting at a billiard hall in Playas.
- 20 July –
  - José Adolfo Macías Villamar, the leader of the Los Choneros gang, is extradited to the United States to face drug-trafficking charges.
  - A pickup truck and an SUV collide in Manabí Province, killing nine people.
- 26 July – Ecuador deports 600 Colombian detainees through the Rumichaca Bridge in Carchi Province, prompting criticism from the Colombian government accusing its counterparts of failing to coordinate the transfer.
- 27 July – Seventeen people are killed in a gun attack on a bar in El Empalme.
- 31 July – Ecuador signs an agreement with the United States to combat transnational crime by facilitating the exchange of information on suspected criminal offenders and risk assessments of cargo and travelers.

=== August ===
- 8 August – Four people are killed in an attack on a boat off the coast of El Oro Province.
- 10 August – Eight people are killed in a nightclub shooting in Santa Lucía, Guayas Province.
- 17 August – Seven people are killed in shooting at a pool hall in Santo Domingo.

=== September ===
- 4 September – The United States designates the Los Lobos and Los Choneros gangs as foreign terrorist organizations.
- 10 September – Exapromo Costa FC players Maicol Valencia and Leandro Yepez are killed in a shooting in Manta.
- 12 September – Seven people are killed in shooting at a pool hall in Santo Domingo.
- 13 September - The 2025 Ecuador protests begin.
- 19 September – Football player Jonathan González is killed in a shooting in Esmeraldas Province.
- 22 September – Thirteen inmates and one guard are killed while 13 prisoners escape following clashes between the Los Choneros and Los Lobos gangs at a jail in Machala.
- 25 September – Seventeen inmates are killed following clashes between rival drug gangs at a prison in Esmeraldas.
- 28 September – One person is killed while 12 soldiers are injured following clashes between security forces and indigenous demonstrators protesting against the end of fuel subsidies in Otavalo.

=== October ===
- 5 October – A state of emergency is declared in 10 province due to unrest caused by protests against the removal of fuel subsidies.
- 7 October – An attack is made on President Noboa's car in Cañar Province amid protests, resulting in five arrests.
- 8 October – A Eurocopter AS350 B2 helicopter of the Ecuadorian Army crashes near La Merced de Buenos Aires, San Miguel de Urcuquí Canton, injuring the four occupants on board.
- 14 October – One person is killed in a car bombing in Guayaquil.
- 15 October – Bomb attacks are carried out on two bridges in Naranjal and on the boundary of Azuay and El Oro Provinces.
- 19 October – Pope Leo XIV canonizes Italian-born missionary Maria Troncatti, who worked among the Shuar people in the Ecuadorian Amazon for 44 years.

=== November ===
- 9 November – At least 31 people are killed in a prison riot in Machala.
- 10 November – Ecuadorian security crisis: President Noboa transfers 300 high-risk inmates, including former vice president Jorge Glas, to a new maximum-security prison in Santa Elena Province as part of a security strategy targeting gang activity inside overcrowded prisons.
- 16 November –
  - Motions to allow foreign military bases on Ecuadorean territory and start a process to create a new constitution is rejected by around 60% of voters in a referendum.
  - Los Lobos leader Wilmer "Pipo" Chavarria, who faked his death in 2021, is arrested in Spain.
- 17 November – A bus falls off a cliff in Tungurahua Province, killing 21 people and injuring 40 others.

=== December ===
- 7 December – Thirteen inmates are killed in clashes at a prison in Machala.
- 18 December – Barcelona S.C. and former national football team player Mario Pineida is shot dead near Guayaquil.
- 22 December – Eleven soldiers are sentenced to 34 years' imprisonment over the abduction and murder of four minors in Guayaquil in 2024.
- 28 December – Six people, including a toddler, are killed and three others are injured in a mass shooting at a beach in Puerto López, Manabí Province.

== Holidays ==
- 1 January – New Year's Day
- 3–4 March – Carnival
- 18 April – Good Friday
- 1 May – Labour Day
- 23 May – Battle of Pichincha
- 11 August – National Day Holiday
- 10 October – Independence of Guayaquil
- 1 November – All Souls' Day
- 3 November – Independence of Cuenca
- 25 December – Christmas Day

== Deaths ==
- 24 February — Josefina Villalobos, 100, First Lady (1992–1996).
- 22 May — Alfredo Palacio, 86, president (2005–2007) and vice president (2003–2005).
- 5 July — Pedro Aguayo, 85, vice president (1998).
- 17 August — Víctor Maldonado Barreno, 98, Roman Catholic prelate, auxiliary bishop of Guayaquil (1990–2003).
- 24 August — Mariuxi Sanchez, 43, MP (since 2021).
- 19 September – Jonathan González, 30, footballer (Independiente del Valle, L.D.U. Quito, national team).
- 17 December – Mario Pineida, 33, footballer (Barcelona S.C., national team).
- 18 December – Rodrigo Borja Cevallos, 90, president (1988–1992).
