= Canoa =

- Town
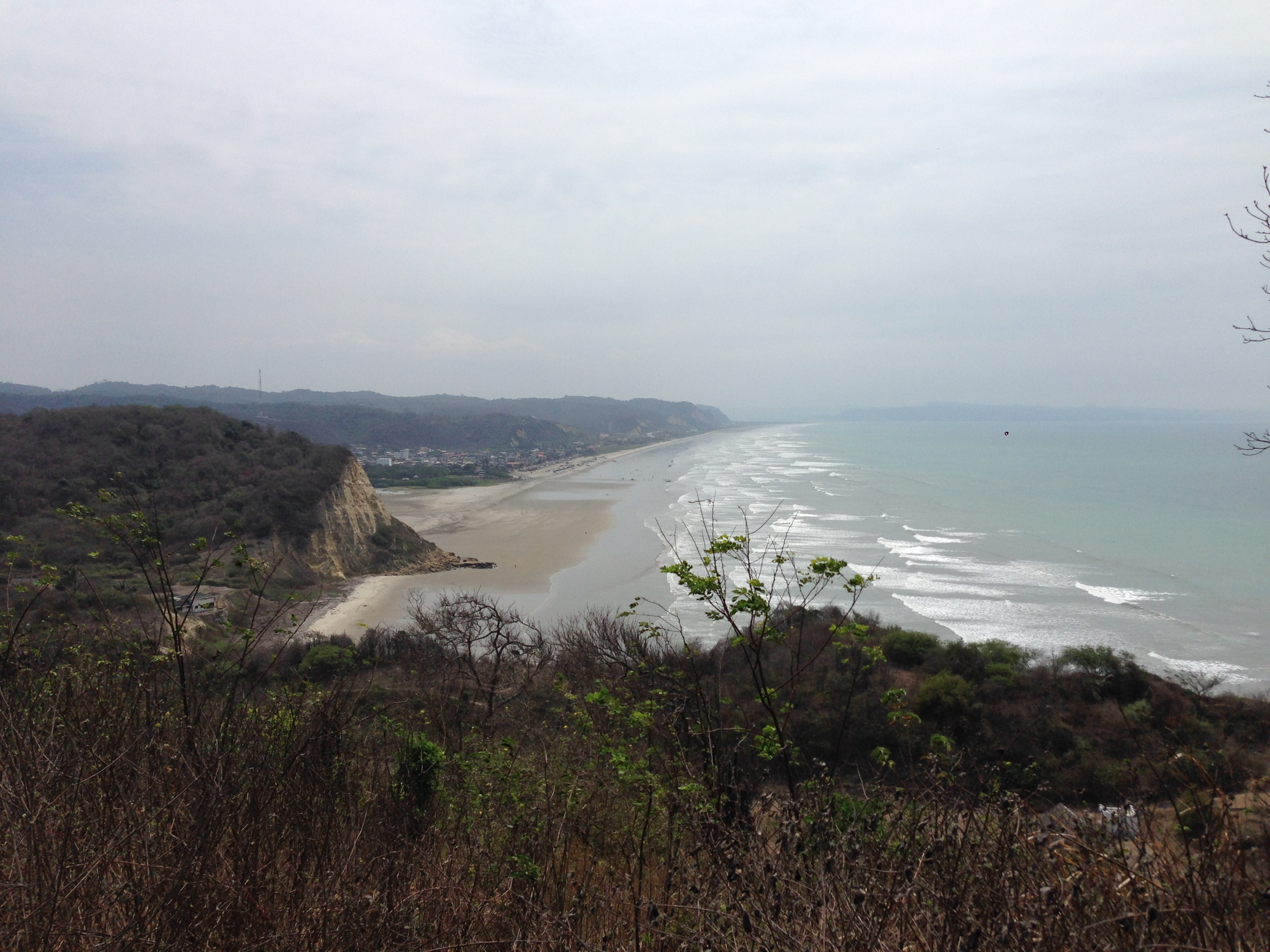
- Facing south overlooking the coast and town of Canoa, Ecuador
- Interactive map of Canoa
- Coordinates: 0°27′47″S 80°27′07″W
- Country: Ecuador
- Province: Manabí
- Canton: San Vicente
- Climate: BSh

Canoa is a town in the Canton of San Vicente in the Manabí Province of Ecuador.

Canoa is located north of Bahía de Caraquez, Province of Manabí – Ecuador. Local stories and tales say that the natives of Canoa hid deep in the hills when they saw invaders approaching, leaving the beautiful beach deserted. 100 years later, Jesuit priests arrived and along with Canoans, they celebrated the birth of yet another Spanish community.

In its beginnings, Canoa was called Pantaguas o Pintagua. Juan de Velasco, a priest, was the first to include Canoa in a map of the old Reino de Quito (Kingdom of Quito). At the turn of the 20th century, the beach was officially recognized and became part of the Cantón Sucre (Bahía de Caraquez). Canoa was registered as part of the Cantón San Vicente at the end of the 20th century.

Canoa is one of the best beaches to learn to surf. Waves are available all day, all year as the sandy bottom beach breaks receive ocean swells from the north and south. The water is warm year round as it is very close to the equator as well.

The town suffered extensive damage during the 2016 Ecuador earthquake but has recouped and is open for tourism.

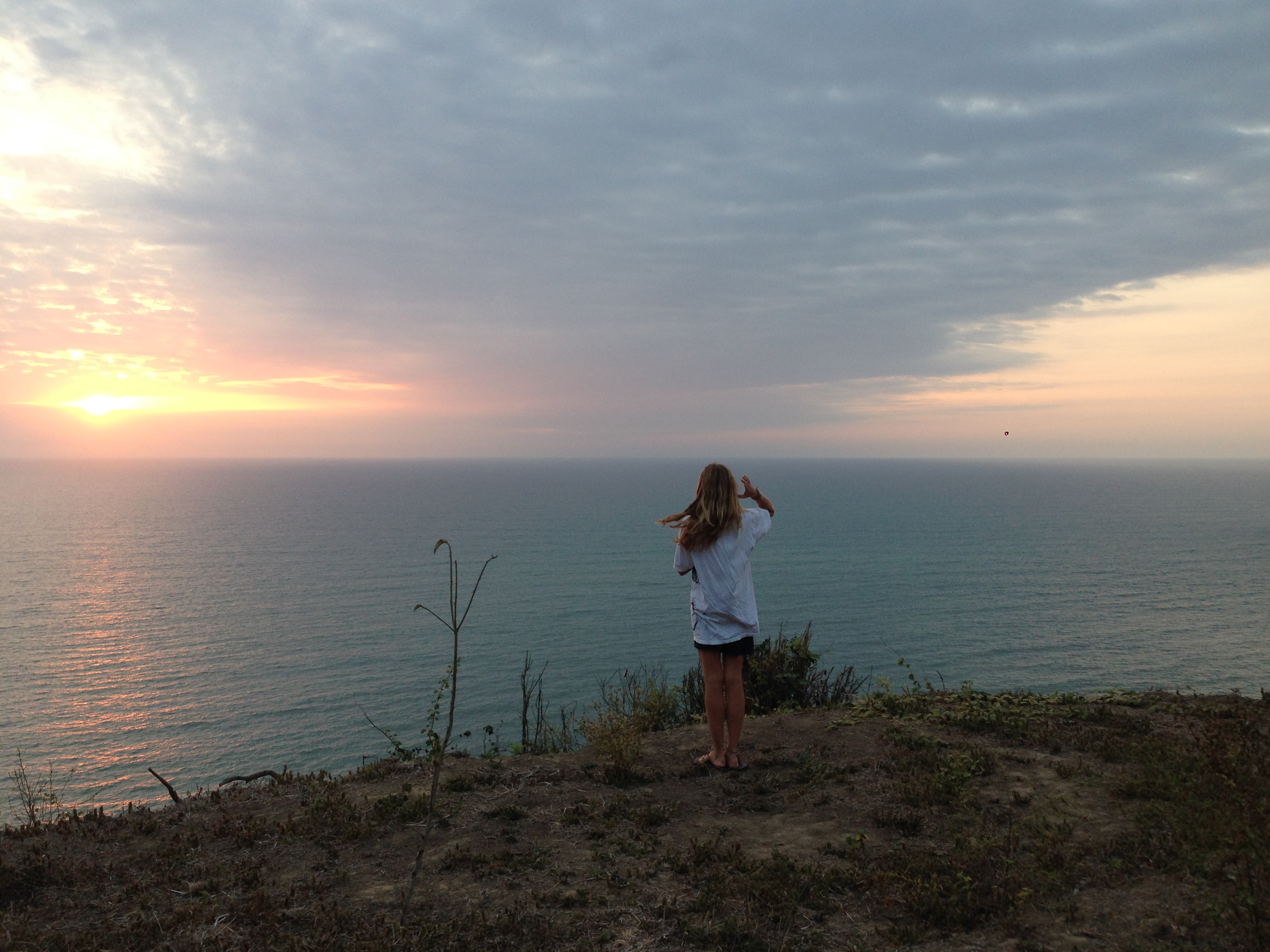
Pacific Ocean Sunset from Canoa, Ecuador

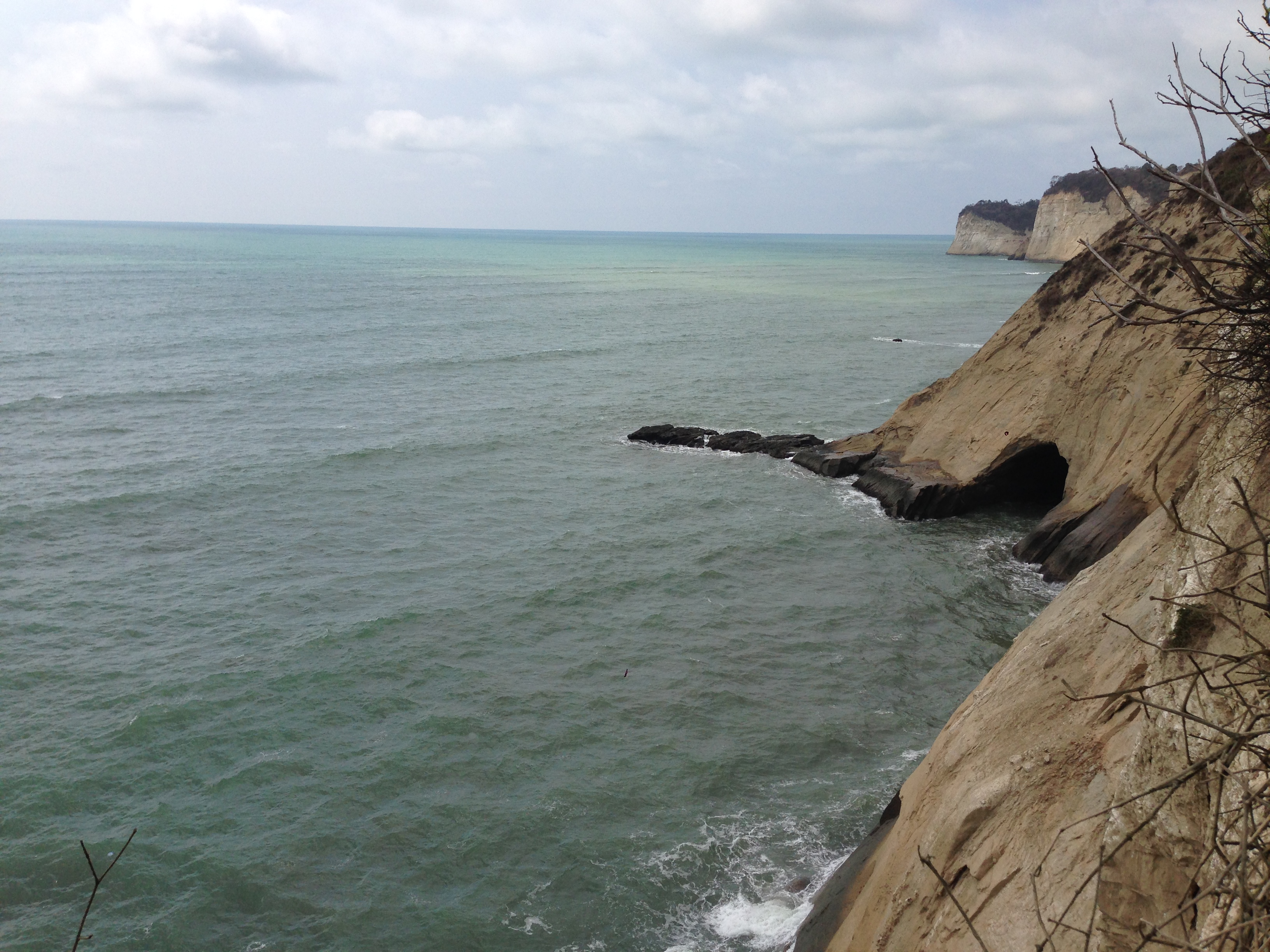
A view north up the coast from Canoa, Ecuador

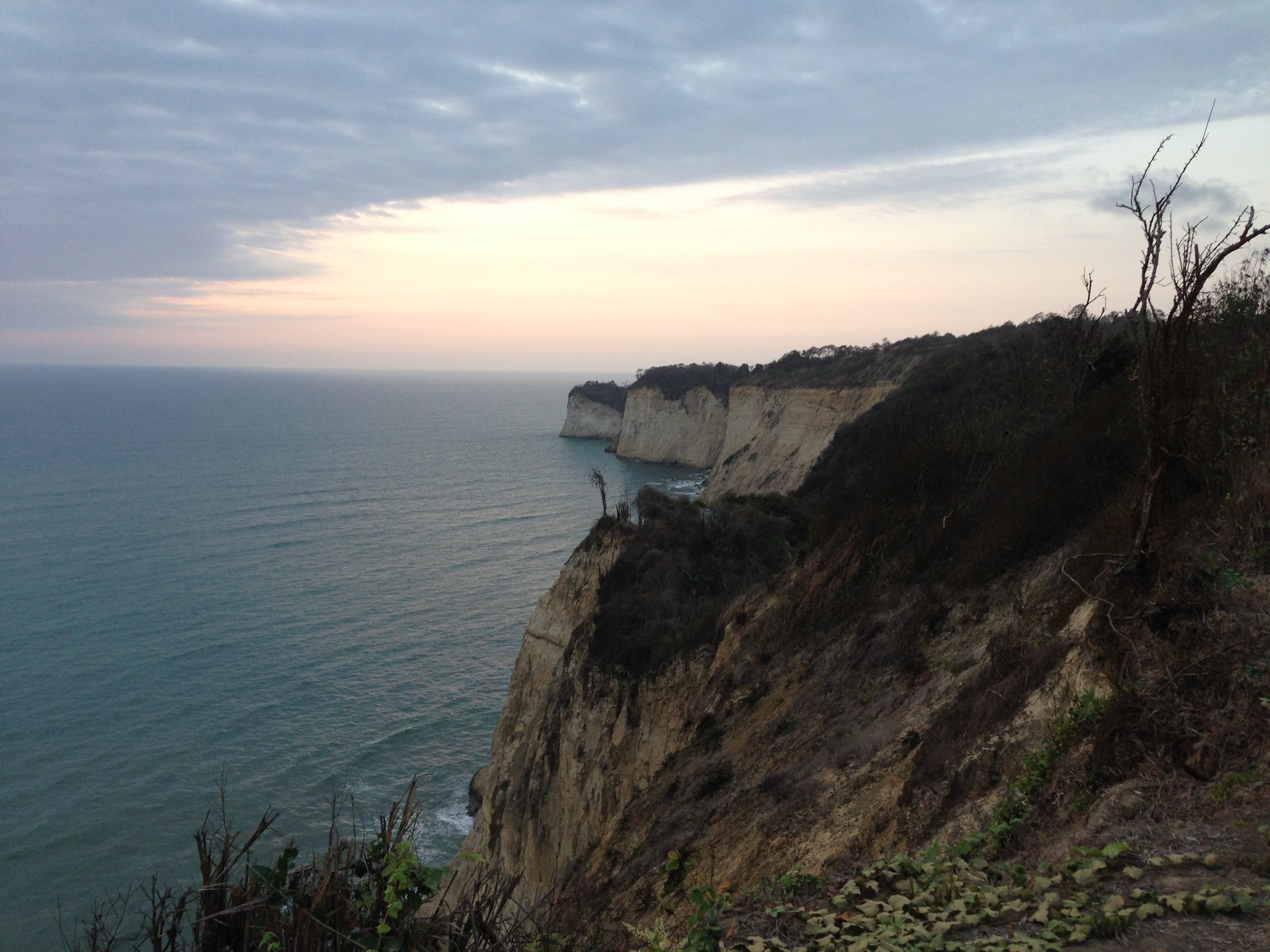
Staggering Cliffs looking north from Canoa

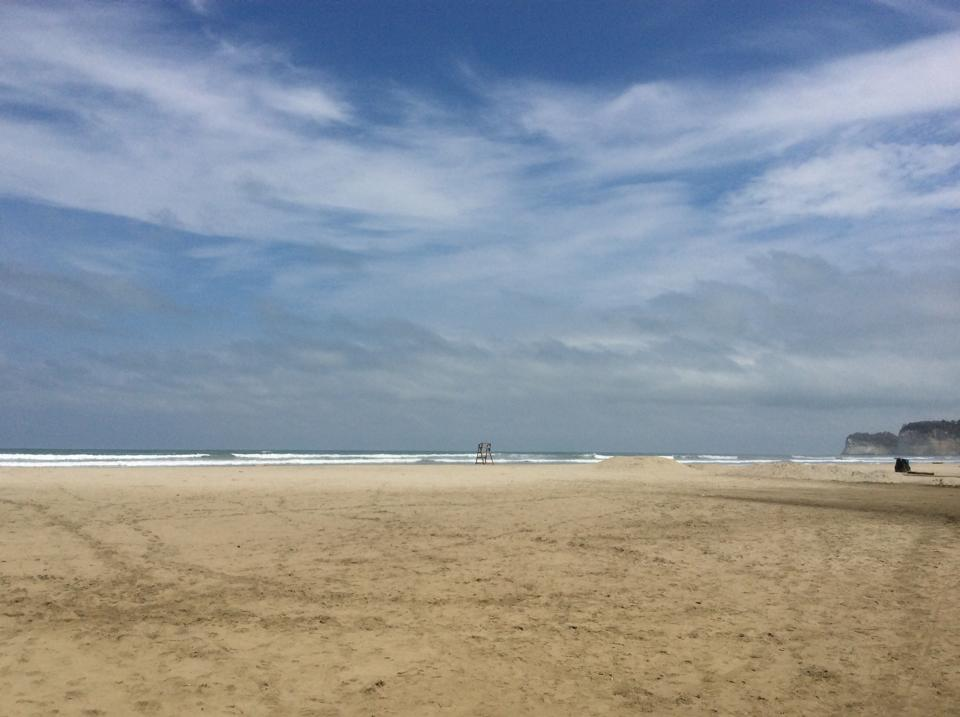
Beautiful Canoa Beach

== Sources ==
- "About the Area — Canoa Beach Hotel in Canoa, Ecuador". canoabeachhotel.com. Archived from the original on January 24, 2013.
