= 1941 in Ecuador =

- Decades: 1920s; 1930s; 1940s; 1950s; 1960s
- See also: Other events in 1941 · Timeline of Ecuadorian history

The following lists events that happened during 1941 in the Republic of Ecuador.

== Incumbents ==
- President: Carlos Alberto Arroyo del Río

== Events ==
- July 5–31 - Ecuadorian–Peruvian War
- July 27 - Peruvian Army seize port of Puerto Bolivar
