= Diana Carnero =

Ecuadorian politician (1995–2024)

Member of Naranjal City Council
- In office 2023 – 7 February 2024

Personal details
- Born: Diana Carnero Elizalde; 22 January 1995 Ecuador
- Died: 7 February 2024 (aged 29) Ecuador
- Manner of death: Assassination (gunshot wounds)
- Political party: Citizen Revolution Movement
- Occupation: Politician

Diana Carnero Elizalde (22 January 1995 – 7 February 2024) was an Ecuadorian politician from the Citizen Revolution Movement. She served as the Member of Naranjal City Council in 2023 until her assassination.

== Career ==
Carnero was a member of Naranjal City Council after being first elected in the 2023 Ecuadorian local elections.

== Death ==
Carnero was shot by hitmen on motorcycles in a public street. She was 29. Carnero had been holding a public meeting. She died at the hospital in Naranjal. Former President Rafael Correa paid tribute to Carnero. The president of her party and former presidential candidate Luisa González mourned her death.

== See also ==
- Brigitte García
