= 1875 in Ecuador =

- Decades: 1850s; 1860s; 1870s; 1880s; 1890s
- See also: Other events in 1875 · Timeline of Ecuadorian history

This article contains a partial list of notable events occurring in the year 1875 in Ecuador.

== Incumbents ==
- President:
  - Gabriel García Moreno (until August 6)
  - Francisco León Franco (August 6 – September 15)
  - José Javier Eguiguren (October 6 – December 9)
  - Antonio Borrero (starting December 9)
- Vice President: Francisco Xavier León

== Events ==
- August 6 - President García Moreno is assassinated by Faustino Rayo and three others. Rayo is shot and killed the same day by police.

== Deaths ==
- August 6
  - Gabriel García Moreno, president, assassination
  - Faustino Rayo, assassin of President Garcia Moreno, shot in police custody
