= San Vicente, Ecuador =

San Vicente
- Town
- Location within Ecuador
- Coordinates: 0.59104°S 80.40942°W
- Country: Ecuador
- Province: Manabí
- Canton: San Vicente Canton

Area
  - Town: 3.45 km^{2} (1.33 sq mi)

Population (2022 census)
  - Town: 10,404
  - Density: 3,020/km^{2} (7,810/sq mi)
- Climate: BSh
- Website: www.manabi.gov.ec/cantones16-san-vicente/

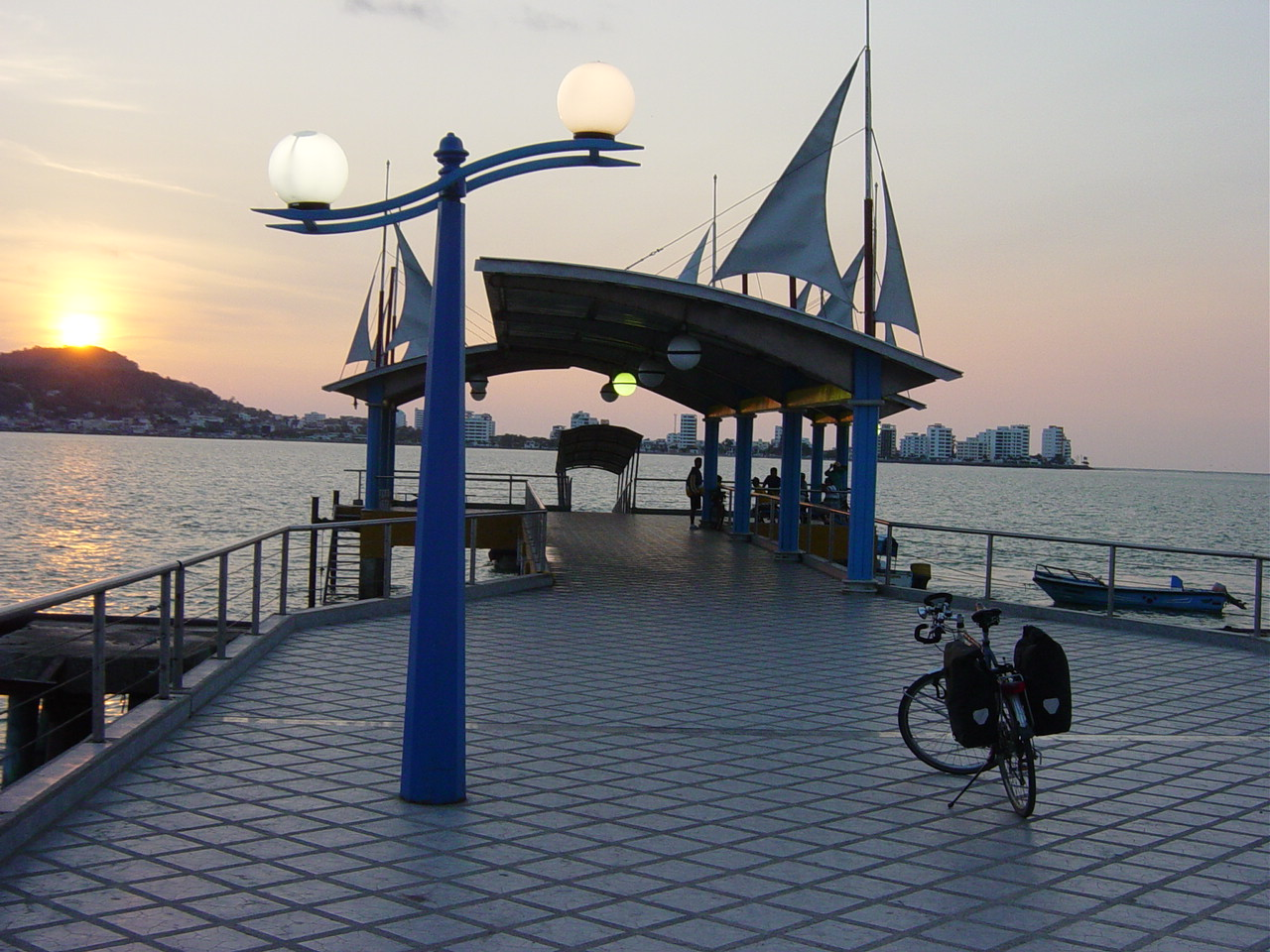

San Vicente is a town in the Manabí province of Ecuador and the capital of San Vicente Canton.

On 23 March 2024, Ecuador's youngest mayor, 27-year-old Brigitte García, mayor of San Vicente for the opposition Citizen Revolution Movement, was shot dead.

== People ==
- Brigitte García, mayor from 2023 to 2024
