= Manuel Adolfo Varas =

Ecuadorian broadcaster, sports journalist, and lawyer (1943–2020)

- Born: Manuel Adolfo Varas Varas; April 2, 1943
- Died: March 30, 2020 (aged 76); Guayaquil, Ecuador
- Occupations: Sports journalist & lawyer

Manuel Adolfo Varas Varas (April 2, 1943 – March 30, 2020) was an Ecuadorian broadcaster, sports journalist and lawyer. Varas, who co-founded Radio Caravana 750 AM and reported from the station for 39 years, was considered a pioneer of sports journalism in Ecuador and one of the country's best known sports journalists.

== Biography ==
Varas was a lawyer by training, but spent more than 55 years as a sports journalist and commentator. His career began on the América radio station in 1964. He broadcast from the 1966 Copa Libertadores games. He then worked at a series of stations and radio shows focused on athletics, including Sucesos, Bolívar, Mambo (as a guest commentator), Noticia, and La Fabulosa. He also wrote for El Universo.

In 1985, Varas joined with colleagues to found and launch Radio Caravana 750 AM in Guayaquil, where he worked for more than 30 years. He hosted the sports show, Los Comentaristas, until his retirement from the show in April 2017.

Varas died from complications of COVID-19 on March 30, 2020, in Guayaquil, Ecuador, at the age of 76.
