= Urban evolution of colonial Quito =

In almost three centuries of the Spanish colonization period, close to one thousand cities were founded in the Americas. These new towns were built in accordance to several legislative documents that were given by the Spanish Crown to regulate, among many other aspects in the American colonies, the creation of new settlements. In order to assure a long lasting presence of the Spanish Crown, the command given to the conquistadors was that the settlements were to be permanent so they could have a strategic role in the discovery, conquest and administration of the new world.

Quito is one of the cities founded by the Spanish. It was located 2,800 meters above sea level in a territory previously occupied by an indigenous population. One of the advantages this place offered was that, due to the complicated topography of creeks and mountains, it had favorable conditions for defending the city against a possible uprising of the indigenous inhabitants.

== Foundation ==
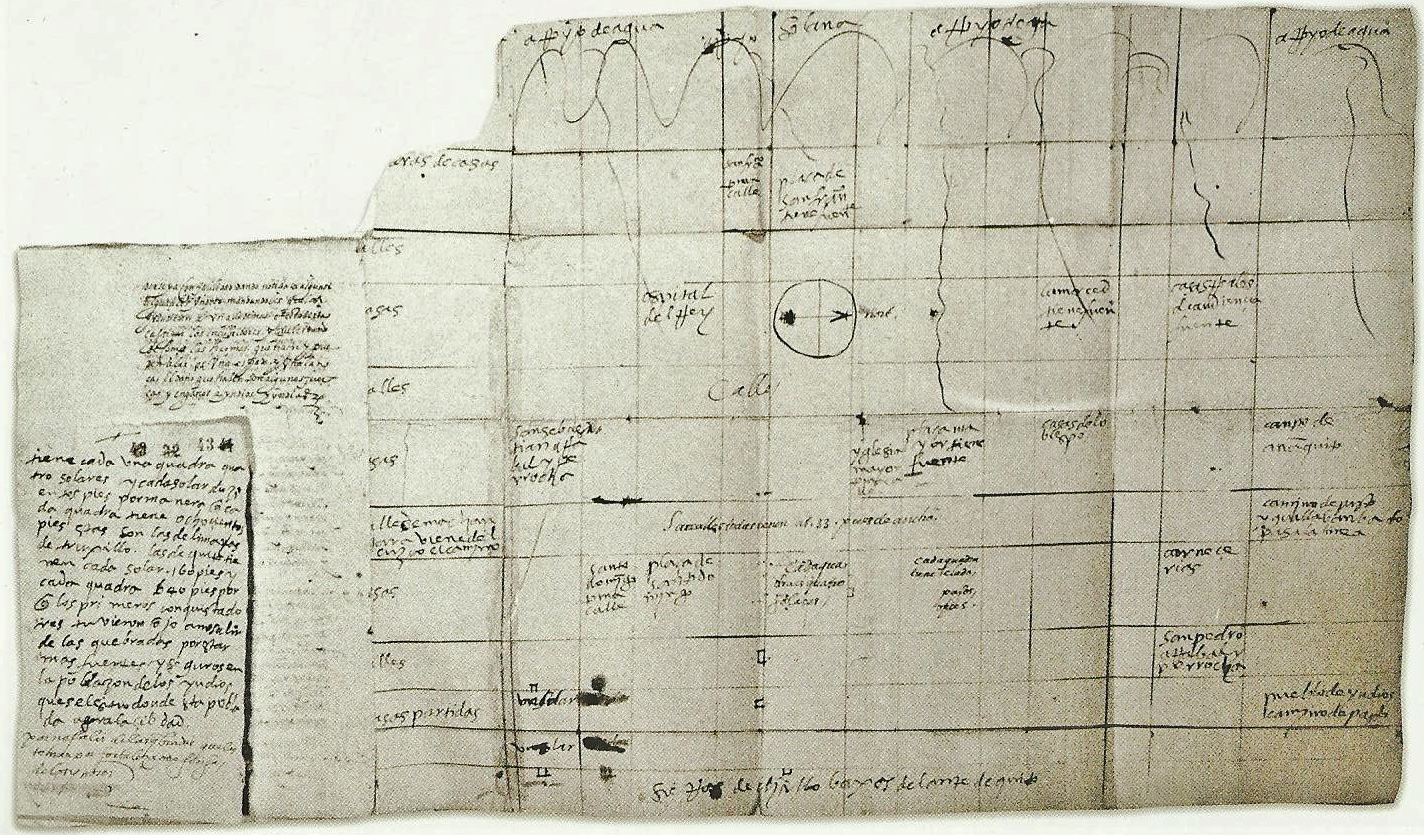
First graphic of the layout of Colonial Quito

It is not certain if Quito had a foundational plan as it was recommended by the Spanish Crown for every new settlement. However, its founders surely followed and adapted the instructions to the complicated terrain where they settled. All works had to start by the establishment of the Main Plaza and then extend the square grid and the streets so they would connect to gates and main roads leaving enough space for the growth of a future population. The regularity of the Damero, as the square Spanish Grid was called, was broken by the creeks and elevations existing in this site. The blocks had to be made smaller and many of them rectangular when cut by a creek. Despite the efforts of the settlers to adapt this system to the site, many of the streets and allotments turned out having a very steep slope. This characteristic became one of the peculiarities of this historical center.

There is no clear consensus over the shape of the original allotments since the first plan that included this information was only published by 1887 by Gualberto Pérez, over three hundred years after the foundation. However, some studies suggest that every block was divided in eight allotments of 55 by 110 foot and that there were around three hundred houses in the city.

== The development era ==
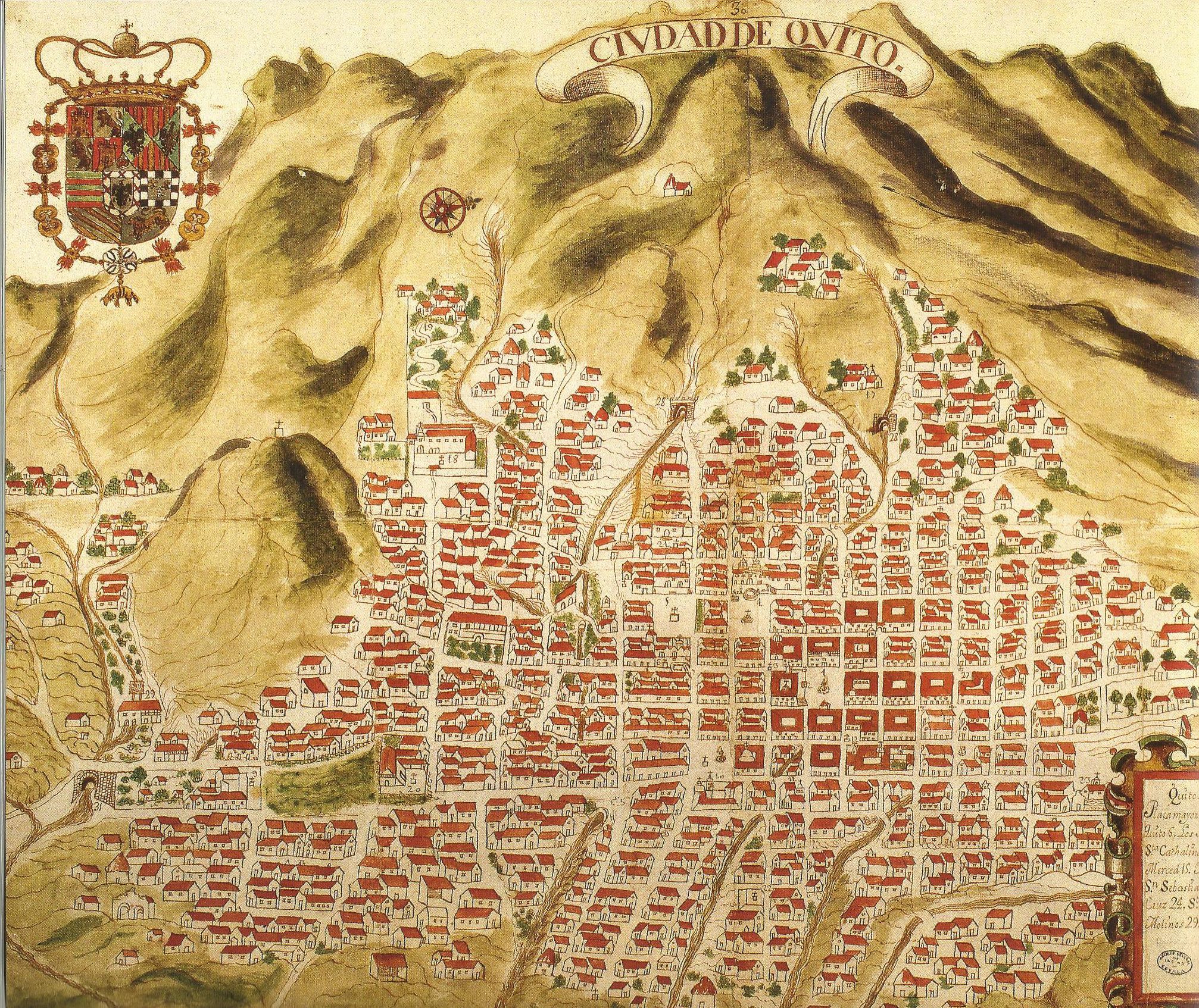
Plan created by Dionisio Alcedo y Herrera and found in the Archive of the Indies.

The first graphical representation of the layout of the city is an anonymous draft dated 1573 made for the Spanish Crown. It situates the main elements of the city, but most of them are misplaced. It is believed that the author was drafting by memory once he went back to Spain. In this plan, the city did not exceeded six by five blocks and it is believed to represent the shape of the city before 1569 since some elements added after this date are not included in this draft.

When King Philip II raised the city of Quito to Royal Audience in 1563, new infrastructure was built to house the growing population. Bridges were created over the creeks that crossed through the city and, later, they were piped and leveled to generate more space for dwellings and streets. The original topography of the city was changed allowing more people to populate a bigger area. This started the period of biggest expansion the city knew for several centuries.

Over two hundred years had to pass until another plan of the city was drafted. In 1734, Dionisio Alcedo y Herrera, President of the Tribunal of the Royal Audience of Quito, created a representation of the layout of the city that showed that Quito had grown over three times its original size and that showed how it had extended especially to the north and south. This was the period of the biggest and most rapid growth of Colonial Quito (Barrera, 1922). All the plazas, monasteries, and most of the streets that are shown in this map, are kept until the current days. This plan also skillfully incorporates the elevations of the buildings and it is clear that most of them have not changed ever since.

== The stagnation era ==
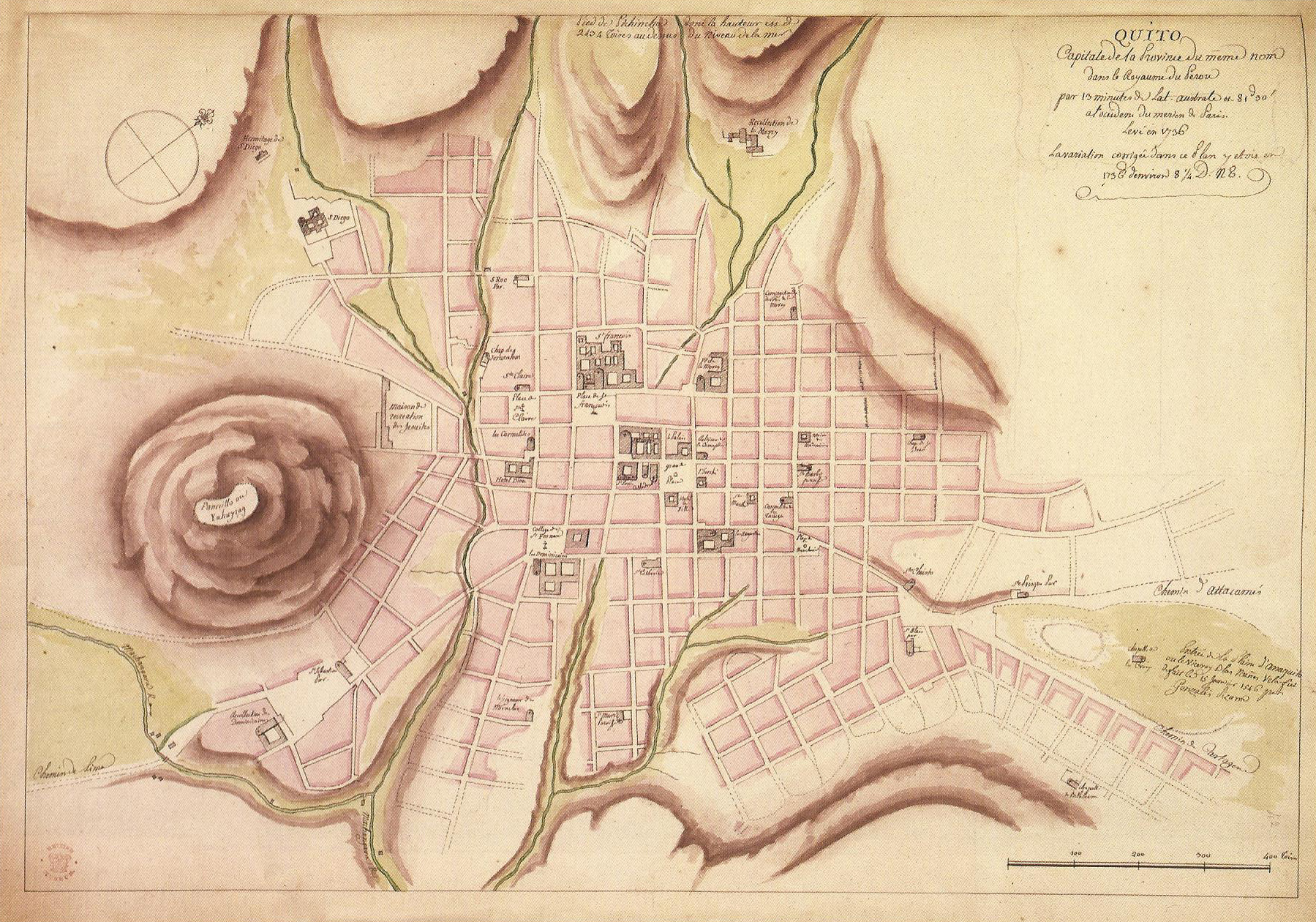
Plan created by the Academy of Sciences of Paris and found in the British Library.

When scientists from the French Academy of Sciences arrived in Quito, by 1736, they created what is probably the first modern representation of the plan of the city in terms of technique, scale and proportion. They calculated that the city had between fifty and sixty thousand inhabitants and it is clear that by this moment most of what today is the Historic Center of Quito had been built. This plan was reproduced and adapted in a series of publications in France and Spain; however there were no new measurements made until a century later.

Until the end of the 18th century, the population of the city would decline due to earthquakes, volcanic eruptions, famines, economic crisis, plagues, bad sanitary conditions, poor medical attention, among other factors. It was calculated in 1757 by the Italian Jesuit Juan Bautista Coleti that the population was between 46,000 and 48,000 inhabitants. During this time there was no urban expansion and many of the houses in the outskirts of the city were reported to have turned into ruins since almost a quarter of the population was lost or left the city.

== The end of the colonial period ==
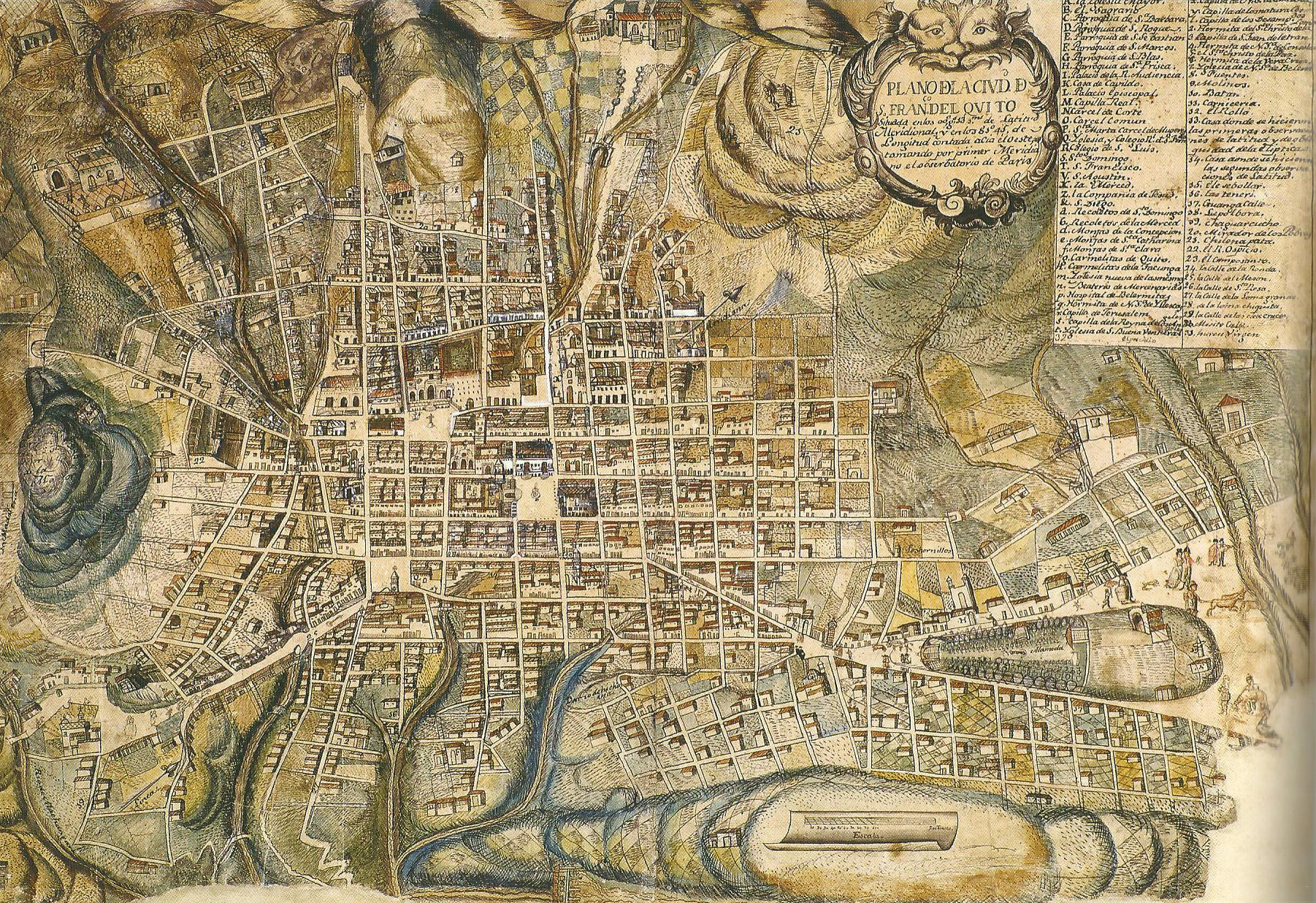
Of unknown author it was property of Juan Pío Montúfar.

In all the new plans that represented Quito there was no evidence of growth in population or area. It was not until 1810 that this could be seen in a map. It is believed that this representation of the city was property of Juan Pío Montúfar, II Marquis of Selva Alegre, but it has no known author. It is an adaptation of the maps made by the French Academy of Sciences, but it incorporated new elements created over the last century. It is clear in this map that the city had grown towards the mountains to the east and west, but the limits in the north and south did not have any significant changes. This map is the last colonial representation of the urban form of Quito. After 1809, several uprisings and military battles led Quito to its independence and years after it became the capital of Ecuador.

The colonial period had ended and the new republic started. The costs of war, political instability and economic crisis caused a very slow recovery and growth for this city. However, it may have been because of these same limitations that the city was preserved in its previous glory that centuries later gave it the acknowledgement by the UNESCO as a World Heritage Site.
