= Posorja =

Coordinates: 2°42′S 80°15′W

Posorja is a small coastal village in Ecuador that lies about 120 km from the city Guayaquil at the delta of the Guayas River. Posorja lies in a very dry climate zone. Many years ago, the main occupation in Posorja was fishing. However, increasing pollution of the sea and new high-tech fishing methods have drastically lowered the income of the people of Posorja. Three fish processing factories give part-time work to some of the people. Of the 15,000 people in the area, 60% do not have regular employment.

== Religion ==
93% Roman-Catholic.

== Schools / education ==
There are 3 types of schools: public (financed by the government), private, and schools financed by charity.
