= Augusto Itúrburu =

Ecuadorian teacher and sports journalist (died 2020)

Augusto Itúrburu Carabajo (Guayaquil, Ecuador; 1979 or 1980 – 15 April 2020) was an Ecuadorian teacher and sports journalist, known to his colleagues with the surname Tururú; he worked for the newspaper El Telégrafo.

== Early years ==
Augusto Itúrburu Carabajo was born in Guayaquil, Guayas province, Ecuador. When he finished high school, he performed a year of service within his Baháʼí community, during 1998, on the brink of the 1998–99 Ecuador financial crisis, where he lived with disadvantaged communities, teaching young people, staying in their homes and living with the minimum, in places like Tosagua, in Manabí and in the northern area of Esmeraldas, in Selva Alegre and Timbiré.

He studied journalism at the Universidad Laica Vicente Rocafuerte in Guayaquil, where he later taught and where in 2011 he founded the university's radio station, Radio Laica.

== Career ==
He worked since 2013 in the newspaper El Telégrafo, writing articles of sports journalism. During the Soccer World Cup 2014, the newspaper ordered the preparation of supplements with 16 daily pages about the event, called Fanático, in which Itúrburu specialized in reporting on the statistics of the matches, meticulously investigating to corroborate and contrast the information. In this work, together with his colleagues, he maintained a strenuous 12-hour shift during the 32 days of the World Cup, eating inside the office and spending more time with his colleagues at work than with his family. On his initiative, Fanático continued to be published even after the end of the World Cup. He also accepted to be in charge of the Business Committee of El Telégrafo.

In 2016 he conducted a series of interviews of athletes from past eras, such as Segundo Mercado, Cristhian Mora, Bertoni Zambrano, Alfonso Obregón, Marcelo Morales, and Erwin Ramírez, resulting in an increase in the number of readers of the newspaper.

== Death ==
Starting on 12 March 2020, Itúrburu began to show symptoms related to COVID-19; he sought medical help and was prescribed antibiotics, but his condition did not improve. On 16 and 19 March, he went to Los Ceibos Hospital of the Ecuadorian Institute of Social Security (IESS) for breathing problems; on 16 March he was not subjected to any tests despite feeling very ill, and on 19 March he was given penicillin and sent home, where he waited ten more days before a test for COVID-19 could be carried out. He was admitted for respiratory complications at IESS Hospital Los Ceibos on 23 March and obtained the results of the test, which came back positive, when he was already in serious condition. He died on 15 April 2020, due to complications of COVID-19 caused by the SARS-CoV-2 virus, at the age of 40.

His brother Nelson Itúrburu explained to the media that his brother handled his father's credit card and that he took it with him in case he needed to get some money. He also stated that Augusto told him that on the first day of being hospitalized, they made him place the things he took to the hospital, a watch, rings and a wallet, in a red case, which they would give to his relatives, and on the second day he lost communication with him as they took away his telephone. When Nelson went to the hospital to ask about his brother's belongings, he was told that they had already been burned in compliance with COVID-19 procedures, as they might contain the virus. The day after Augusto's death, his father turned on his cell phone and noticed in the text messages that seventeen days earlier someone had stolen money from his credit card, so he went with his son Nelson to the bank to suspend the card, but they found out that the account was active and that the last withdrawal was made that same day at 3:00 a.m. when more than 600 dollars had been stolen, in addition to the father's retirement that was credited to him in the half of April, leaving his bank account empty. Nelson told the press that he believed that this was not the only case and that he doubted that the rings, the watch and the cell phone had been burned.

The Ecuadorian Institute of Social Security issued a statement, where they stated that internal investigations would be carried out to clarify the facts and contacted the journalist's family to provide their support and coordinate actions due to what happened. It also said that for biosecurity reasons, patients cannot enter with personal objects which must be removed by their relatives to avoid contamination in the hospital environment. The Judiciary Police launched an investigation into the event. As a result of the claim of Augusto's relatives that shocked public opinion, complaints were issued by other people who also came forward and accused the same hospital of the theft of their relatives' belongings.
