= 2023 in Ecuador =

- Decades: 2000s; 2010s; 2020s
- See also: Other events of 2023; Timeline of Ecuadorian history

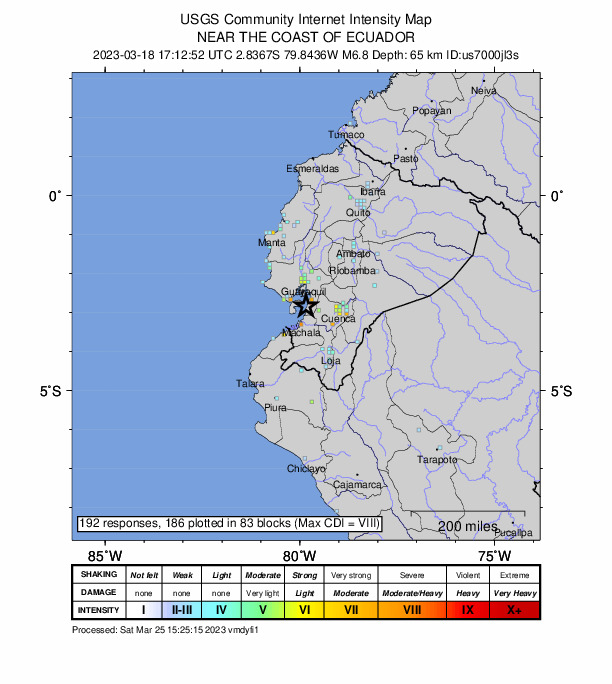

Events in the year 2023 in Ecuador.

== Incumbents ==
- President:
  - Guillermo Lasso (until 23 November)
  - Daniel Noboa (from 23 November)
- Vice President:
  - Alfredo Borrero (until 23 November)
  - Verónica Abad Rojas (from 23 November)

== Events ==
- 5 February — 2023 Ecuadorian constitutional referendum
- 26 February — Assassination of Eduardo Mendúa.
- 16 March — 2023 Guayas earthquake: A 6.8 earthquake strikes the Ecuadorian province of Guayas, damaging buildings, killing at least 18 people, including two in neighboring Peru, and injuring over 400.
- 20 March — Explosive devices disguised as USB flash drives are sent to least five news organizations in Ecuador; one journalist at Ecuavisa in Guayaquil suffers minor injuries.
- 27 March — At least seven people are killed by a landslide in Alausí, Chimborazo Province.
- 28 March — Assassination of Nathaly López Borja.
- 17 May — 2023 Ecuadorian political crisis
- 23 July — Assassination of Manta's mayor, Agustín Intriago.
- 9 August — Ecuadorian presidential candidate Fernando Villavicencio is assassinated by gunmen at a campaign rally in Quito.
- 10 August — Ecuadorian President Guillermo Lasso declares a state of exception following the assassination of presidential candidate Fernando Villavicencio in Quito.
- 12 August —
  - Ecuador transfers head of the Los Choneros criminal group, Jose Adolfo Macias, from Prison 8 in Guayaquil to La Roca maximum security prison. He is accused of threatening presidential candidate Fernando Villavicencio before his assassination.
  - Andrea González Náder, the running mate of assassinated presidential candidate Fernando Villavicencio, is nominated by the Movimiento Construye party to run for president.
- 15 August — Pedro Briones, a local leader of the Citizen Revolution Movement, is assassinated by gunmen in the northern province of Esmeraldas.
- 20 August — First round of the 2023 Ecuadorian general election occurs.
- 3 September — Footballer Yarol Tafur is shot dead.
- 15 October —
  - Ecuadorians vote in the second round of their presidential election, choosing between the candidates Luisa González and Daniel Noboa.
  - The National Electoral Council declares Noboa as president-elect with González conceding defeat. Noboa is Ecuador's youngest president-elect.
- 22 December — Former Ecuadorian vice president Jorge Glas requests asylum in Mexico.
