= Antonio Álvarez =

Antonio Álvarez may refer to:

- Antonio Álvarez de Toledo, 5th Duke of Alba (1568–1639), Spanish nobleman and politician
- Antonio Álvarez Jonte (1784–1820), Argentine politician
- Antonio Álvarez (sprinter) (born 1948), Cuban sprinter
- Antonio Álvarez (footballer, born 1955), Spanish footballer
- Antonio Álvarez Desanti (born 1958), Costa Rican businessman and politician
- Antonio Álvarez Pérez (born 1975), Spanish footballer
- Antonio Enrique Álvarez (born 1979), former Venezuelan baseball player and politician
- Antonio Alvarez II, co-founder of Alvarez and Marsal

== See also ==
- Tony Alvarez (disambiguation)
