= Oswaldo Larriva =

Ecuadorian politician (1946–2020)

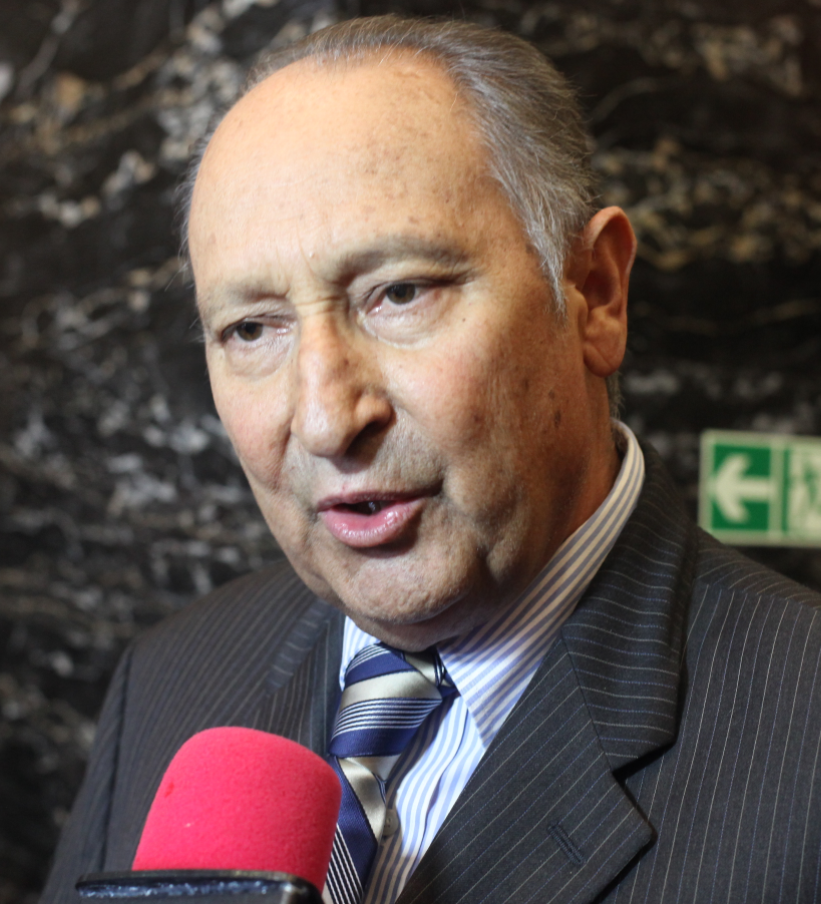
Larriva in 2014

Óscar Oswaldo Larriva Alvarado (1946 – 6 January 2020) was an Ecuadorian politician. He was a member of the National Congress from 1992 to 1994, and served as governor of Azuay Province between 2007 and 2009. Larriva returned to the legislature, which had been reconstituted as the National Assembly, from 2013 to 2017. He returned to the governorship of Azuay Province in 2019.

On 6 January 2020, Larriva died from cancer at age 74.
