= Andean civilizations =

Civilizations of South America's Andes Mountains

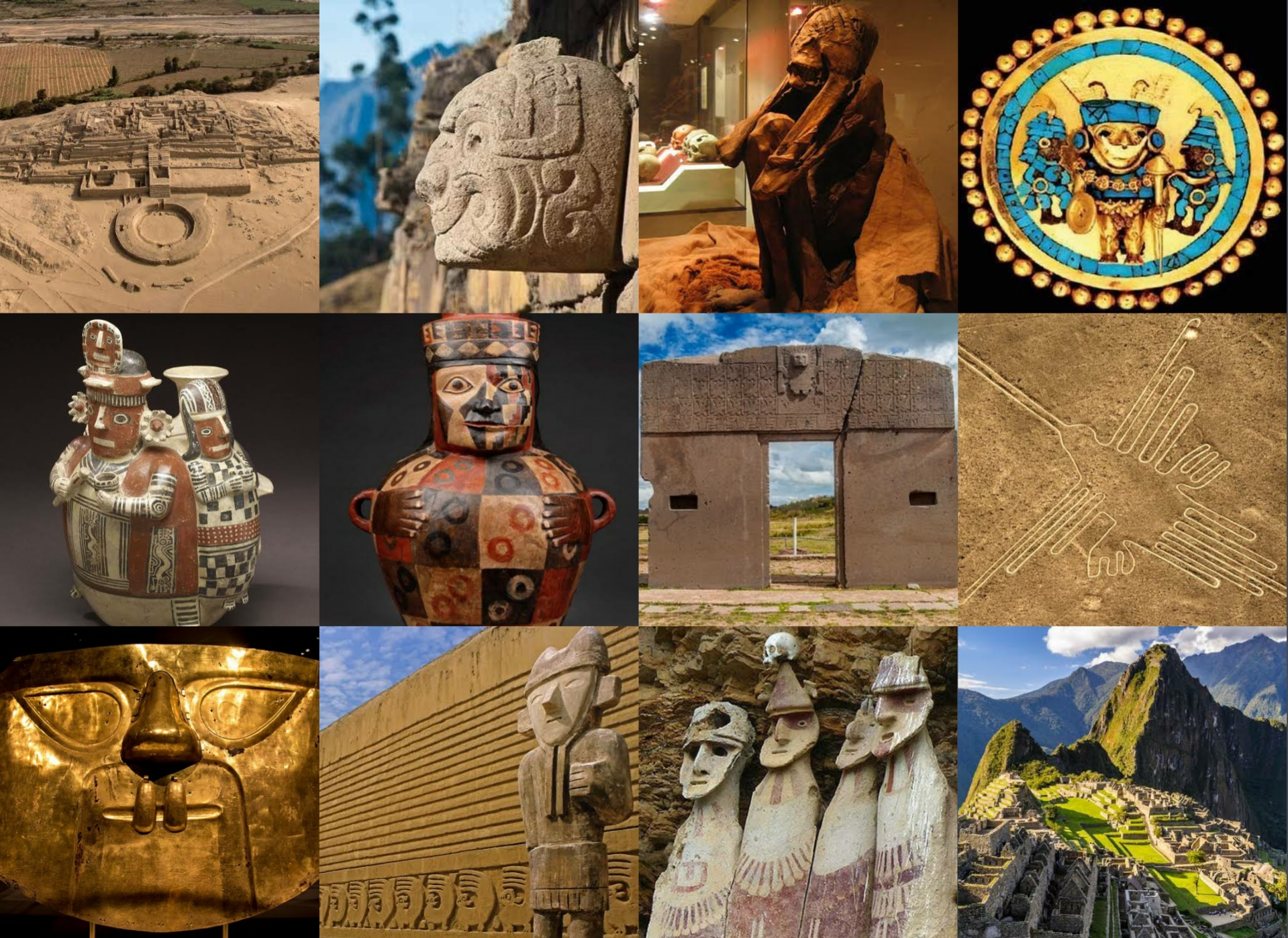
From left to right: view of the sacred city of Caral (the oldest city in the Americas), a clava head (a characteristic symbol of the Chavín culture), a mummy from the Paracas culture, a Moche gold ear ornament inlaid with precious stones, pottery from the Recuay culture, a Wari ceramic vessel, the Gateway of the Sun (belonging to the city of Tiwanaku), a hummingbird figure from the Nazca Lines, a gold mask from the Sicán culture, the Chimú citadel of Chan Chan (the largest adobe city in the Americas), the sarcophagi of the Chachapoya culture, and a view of the Inca citadel of Machu Picchu.

The Inca Empire and its road system encompassed most of the Andean civilization.

The Andean civilizations were South American complex societies of many indigenous people. They stretched down the spine of the Andes for 4,000 km (2,500 miles) from southern Colombia, to Ecuador and Peru, including the deserts of coastal Peru, to north Chile and northwest Argentina. Archaeologists believe that Andean civilizations first developed on the narrow coastal plain of the Pacific Ocean. The Caral or Norte Chico civilization of coastal Peru is the oldest known civilization in the Americas, dating back to 3500 BCE. Andean civilizations are one of at least five civilizations in the world deemed by scholars to be "pristine." The concept of a "pristine" civilization refers to a civilization that has developed independently of external influences and is not a derivative of other civilizations.

Despite the severe environmental challenges of high mountains and hyper-arid desert, the Andean civilizations domesticated a wide variety of crops, some of which, such as potatoes, peppers, peanuts, manioc, and coca, became of worldwide importance. The Andean civilizations were noteworthy for monumental architecture, an extensive road system, textile weaving, and many unique characteristics of the societies they created.

Less than a century prior to the arrival of the Spanish conquerors, the Incas, from their homeland centered on the city of Cusco, united most Andean cultures into one single empire that encompassed nearly all of what is usually called Andean civilization. The Timoto Cuica of Venezuela remained outside the Inca orbit. The Inca Empire was a patchwork of languages, cultures and peoples. Spanish rule ended or transformed many elements of the Andean civilizations, notably influencing religion and architecture.

== History ==
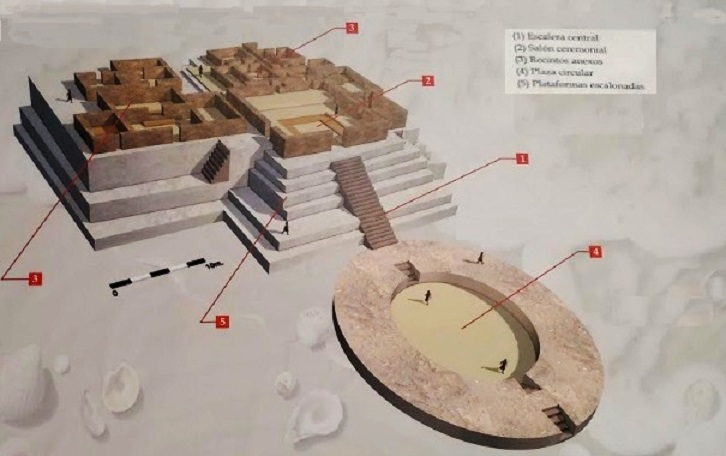
Reconstruction of one of the pyramids of Aspero

After the first humans — who were then arranged into hunter-gatherer tribal groups — arrived in South America via the Isthmus of Panama, they spread out across the continent, with the earliest evidence for settlement in the Andean region dating to circa 15,000 BCE, in what archaeologists call the Lithic Period. In the ensuing Andean preceramic period, plants began to be widely cultivated, and first complex society, Caral-Supe civilization, emerged at 3500 BCE, and lasted until 1800 BCE. Also, distinct religious centres emerged, such as the Kotosh Religious Tradition in the highlands.

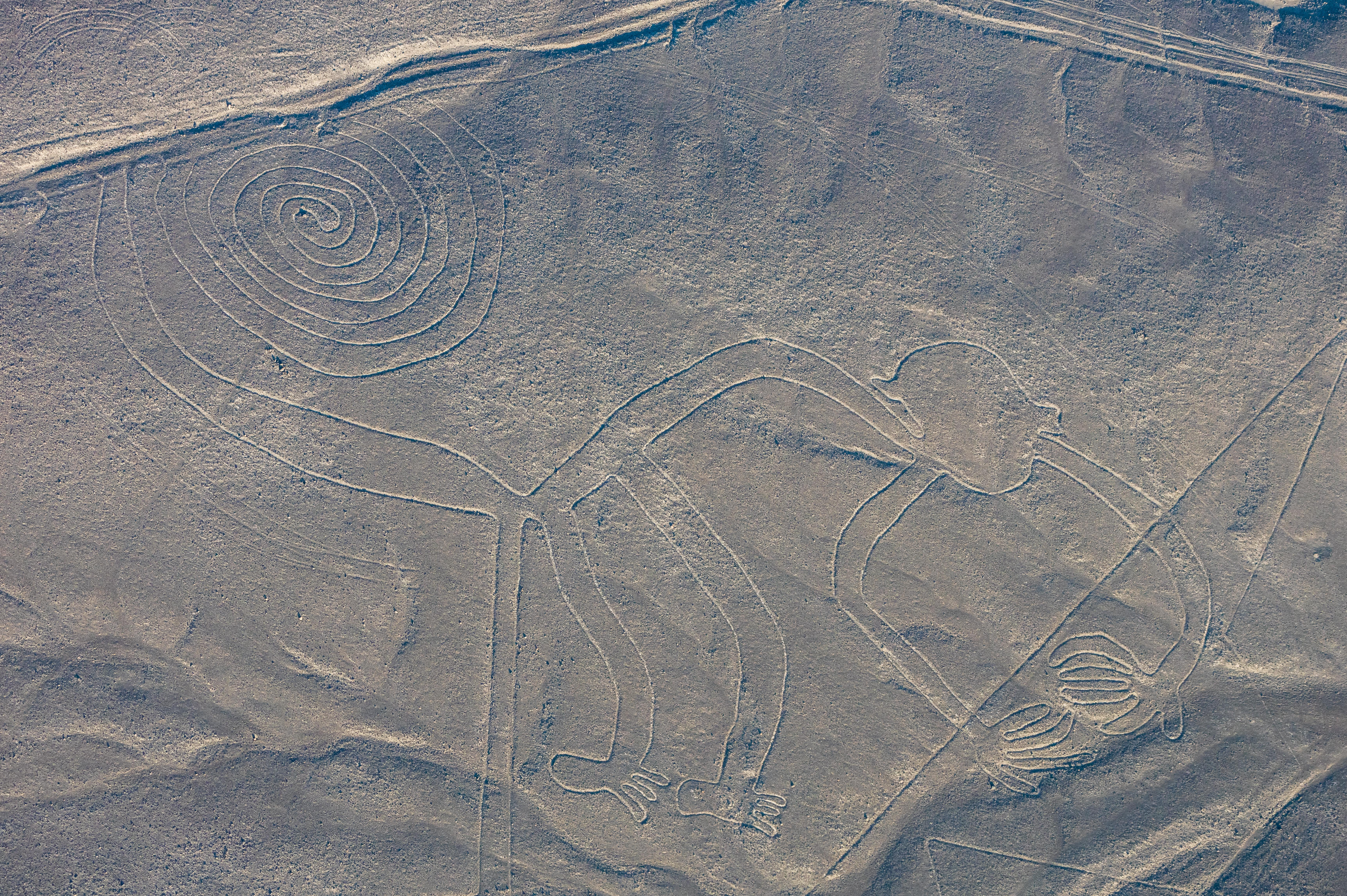
Aerial photograph of one of the Nazca lines, taken in July 2015, that shows the design known as "The monkey"

This was followed by the Ceramic Period. Various complex societies developed at this time, such as Chavín culture, lasting from 900 BCE to 200 BCE, Paracas culture, lasting from 800 BCE to 200 BCE, its successor Nazca culture, lasting from 200 BCE to 800 CE, the Moche civilisation, lasting from 100 to 700, Wari and Tiwanaku Empires, with both lasting from 600 to 1000, and Chimor, lasting from 900 to 1470.

Machu Picchu, a mountainous settlement that was inhabited during the time of Tahuantinsuyu.

In later periods, much of the Andean region was conquered by the indigenous Incas, who in 1438 founded the largest empire that the Americas had ever seen, named Tahuantinsuyu, but usually called the Inca Empire. The Inca governed their empire from the capital city of Cuzco, administering it along traditional Andean lines. The Inca Empire rose from Kingdom of Cuzco, founded around 1230.

In the 16th century, Spanish colonisers from Europe arrived in the Andes, eventually subjugating the indigenous kingdoms and incorporating the Andean region into the Spanish Empire.

== Uniqueness ==
A quipu

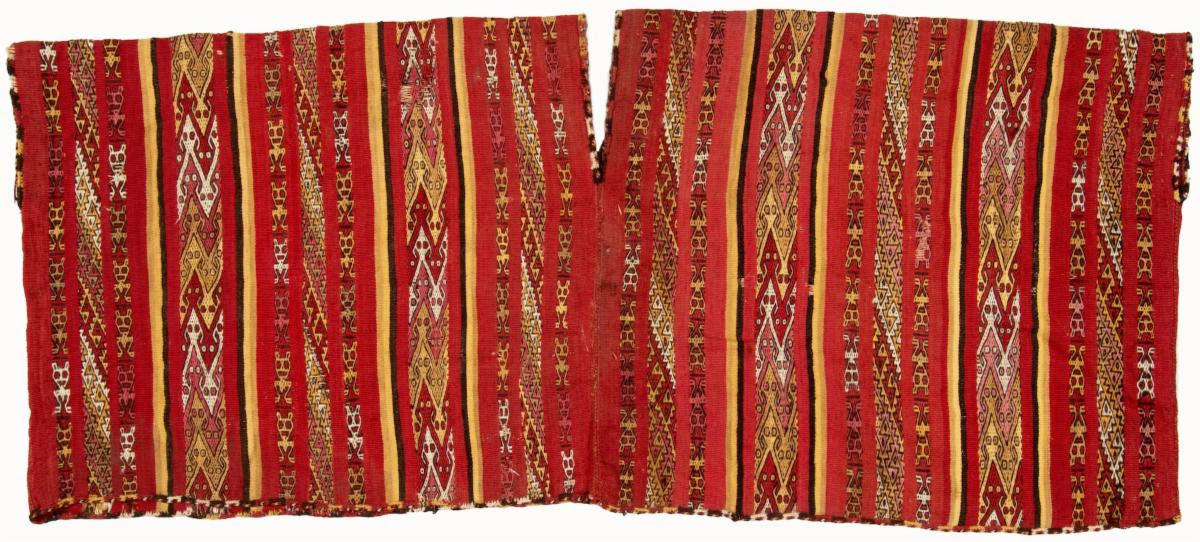
Coastal Andean Men's tunic, 13th–15th century

The civilization of the Andes was one of six in the world deemed by scholars to be "pristine", that is indigenous and not derived from other civilizations. Due to its isolation from other civilizations, the indigenous people of the Andes had to come up with their own, often unique solutions to environmental and societal challenges.

Andean civilization lacked several characteristics distinguishing it from the pristine civilizations in the Old World and from the Mesoamerican cultures. First, and perhaps most important, Andean civilizations did not have a written language. Instead, their societies used the quipu, a system of knotted and colored strings, to convey information. Few quipus survive and they have not yet been fully deciphered. Scholars differ on whether the knotted cords of the quipu were able only to record numerical data or could also be used for narrative communication, a true system of writing. If it is true writing, it is still unique because it is not a set of symbols, but rather knotted strings. The use of the quipu dates back at least to the Wari Empire (600–1000 CE) and possibly to the much earlier civilization of Caral/Norte Chico of the third millennium BCE.

Andean civilizations also lacked wheeled vehicles and draft animals. People on land traveled only by foot and the transport of goods was accomplished by humans or llama, pack animals which could carry loads of up to one-fourth of their weight, a maximum of 45 kilograms (99 lb). Llamas were not big or strong enough to be used for plowing or as riding animals for adults.

Moreover, Andean civilizations faced severe environmental challenges. The earliest civilizations were on the hyper-arid desert coast of Peru. Agriculture was possible only with irrigation in valleys crossed by rivers coming from the high Andes, plus in a few fog oases called lomas. In the Andes, agriculture was limited by thin soils, cold climate, low or seasonal precipitation, and a scarcity of flat land. Freezing temperatures may occur in every month of the year at altitudes of more than 3,000 metres (9,800 ft), the homeland of many of the highland Andean civilizations.

Finally, the Andean civilizations lacked money. Copper axe-monies (also called "naipes") and Spondylus shells functioned as mediums of exchange in some areas, especially coastal Ecuador, but most of the Andes area had economies organized on reciprocity and redistribution rather than money and markets. These characteristics were especially notable during the Inca Empire but originated in much earlier times.

The Andean people had very strong beliefs in sacred spaces more specifically in water landscapes which held an ancestral presence connecting them to sites. They truly believed in Wiracocha as their god which was their creator. As the land dispersed all around they believed that they were connected with the land.

== Agriculture ==
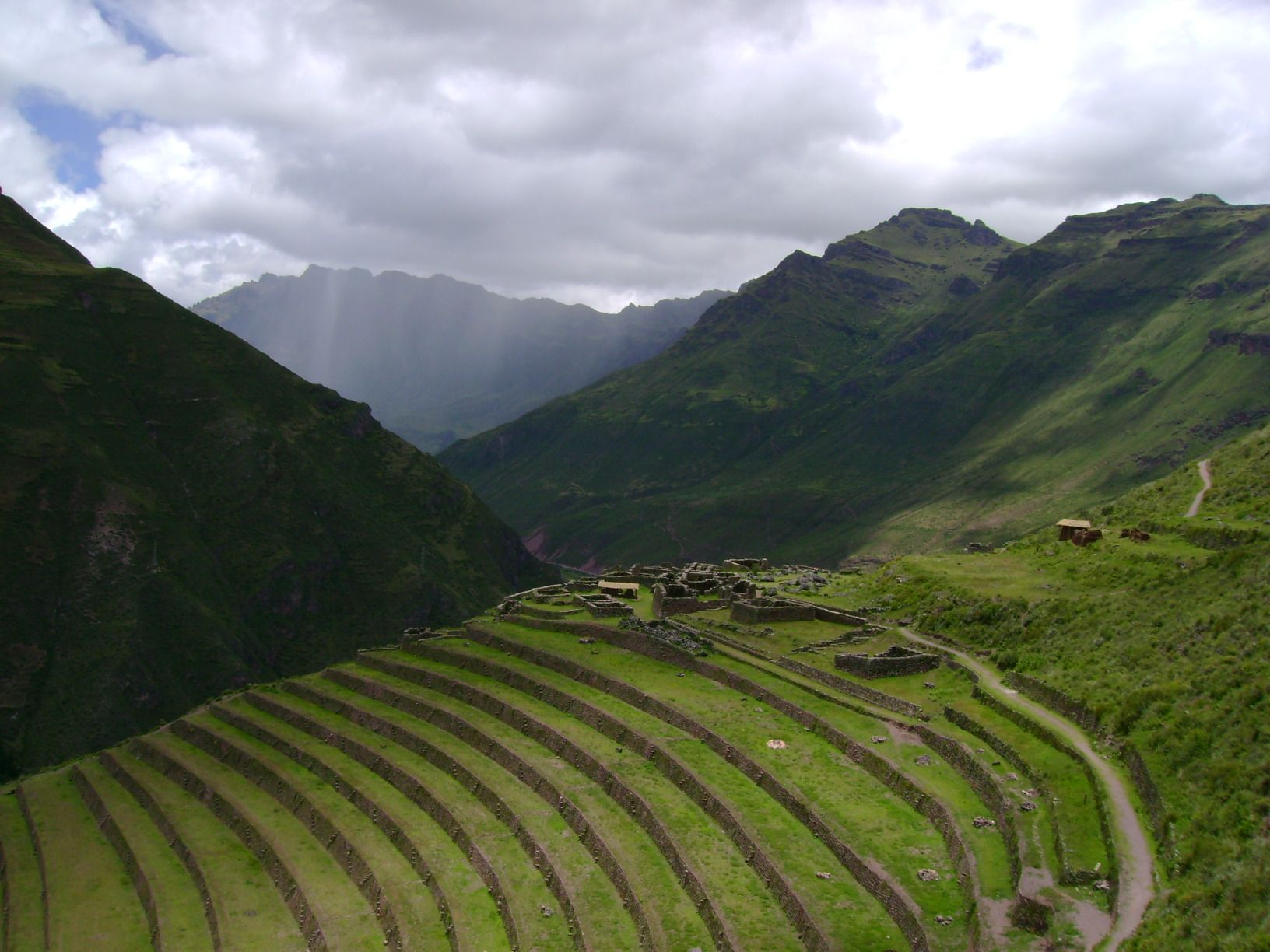
Agricultural terraces (andenes) were widely built and used for agriculture in the Andes.

Agriculture in South America may have begun in coastal Ecuador with the domestication of squash about 8000 BCE by the Las Vegas culture.

Some scholars believe that the earliest civilizations on the Peruvian coast initially relied more upon maritime resources than agriculture during the formative period of their societies. However, as in all civilizations until the late 19th century, agriculture was the principal occupation of the great majority of the people. The greatest contribution of Andean civilization to the modern world has been the plants its people domesticated. Crops grown by the Andeans were often unique to the region. Maize, which found its way to the Andes from Mexico, was often the most important crop at lower and intermediate elevations. The Andeans cultivated an estimated 70 different plants, almost as many as were cultivated in all of Europe and Asia. Many of these plants are no longer cultivated, or are minor crops, but important plants which were domesticated in or near the Andes include potatoes, quinoa, tomatoes, chile peppers, cotton, coca, tobacco, pineapples, peanuts, and several varieties of beans. Animals domesticated in the Andes were llamas and guinea pigs.

The challenges of the environment required sophisticated agricultural technology. Unlike the Middle East, the Andes lacked easily domesticated and large-seeded plants such as wheat and barley and large and easily domesticated animals such as horses and cattle. Agriculture on the desert coast required the development of irrigation. In the mountains, the elevation, cold climate and steep terrain required a range of technological solutions such as terraces (andén), exploitation of microclimates, and selective breeding. Due to the climatic uncertainties, farmers traditionally farmed several crops at several elevations and exposures. At a macro level, societies and states did the same with the vertical archipelago, establishing colonies at different elevations and locations to increase the possibilities of agricultural success.

== Archaeological cultures ==
=== Caral ===
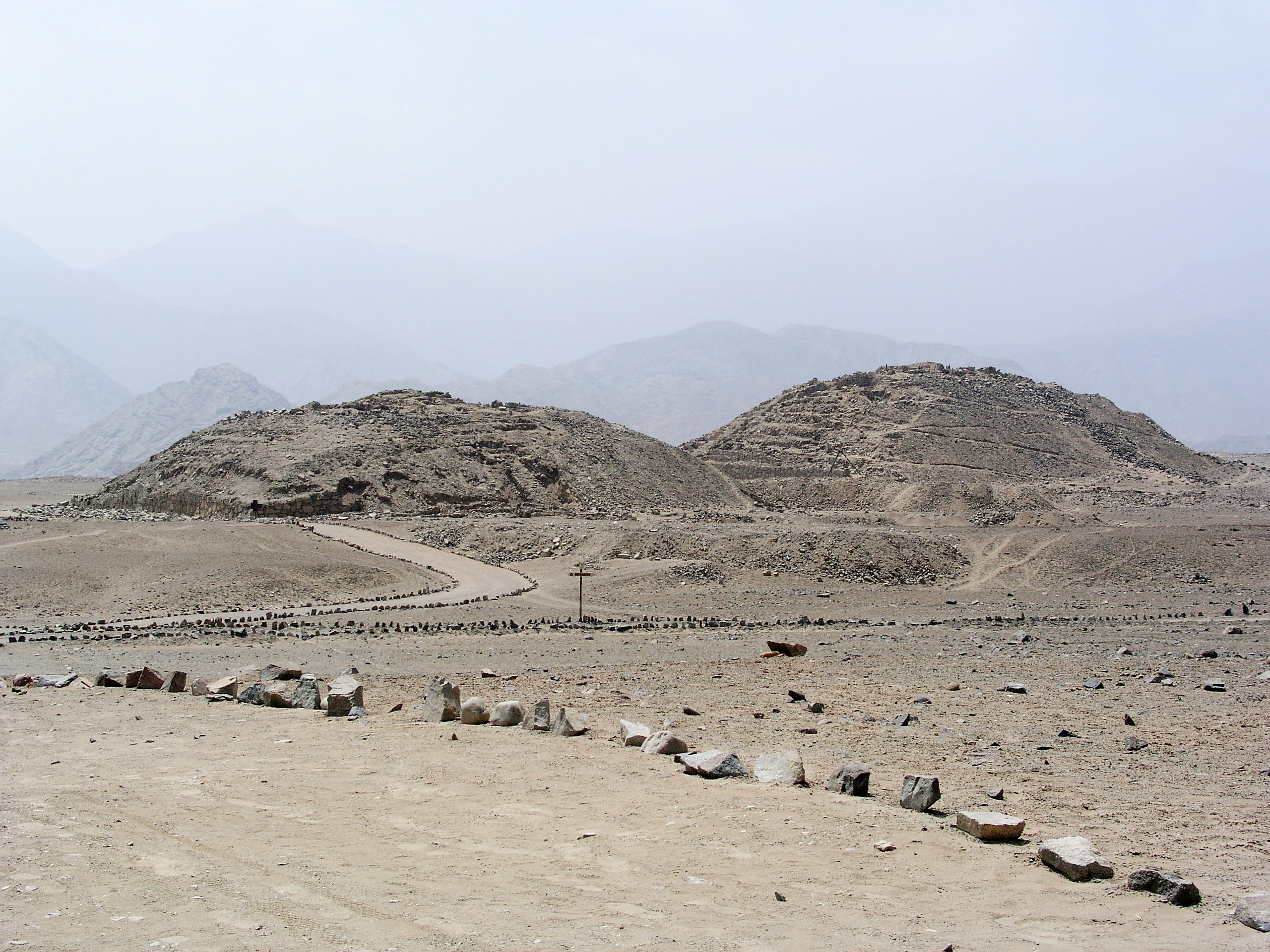
The Caral pyramids in the arid Supe Valley, some 20 km from the Pacific coast

The Norte Chico civilization, also called Caral, was a complex pre-Columbian society that included as many as 30 major population centers in what is now the Norte Chico region of north-central coastal Peru. It is the oldest known civilization in the Americas and one of the Cradles of civilization where civilization separately originated in the ancient world. It flourished between the 30th century BCE and the 18th century BCE. The alternative name, Caral-Supe, is derived from the Sacred City of Caral in the Supe Valley, a large and well-studied Norte Chico site. Complex society in Norte Chico arose a millennium after Sumer in Mesopotamia, was contemporaneous with the Egyptian pyramids, and predated the Mesoamerican Olmec by nearly two millennia.

=== Valdivia ===
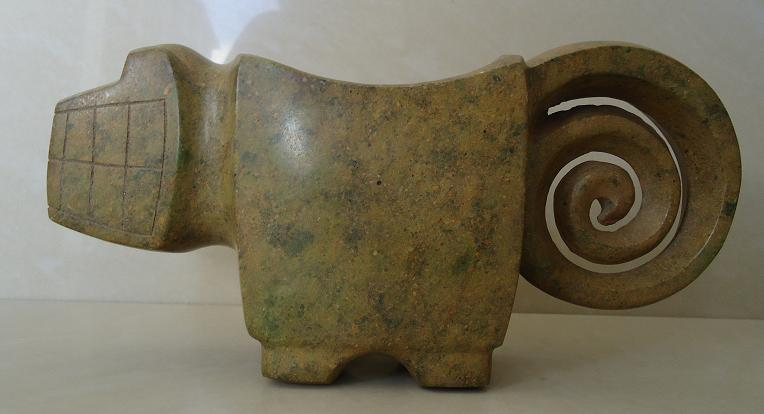
Mortar, Jaguar Valdivia, South Coast (4000 BCE to 1500 BCE)

The Valdivia Culture is one of the oldest settled cultures recorded in the Americas. It emerged from the earlier Las Vegas culture and thrived on the Santa Elena peninsula near the modern-day town of Valdivia, Ecuador between 3500 BCE and 1800 BCE.

=== Chavín ===
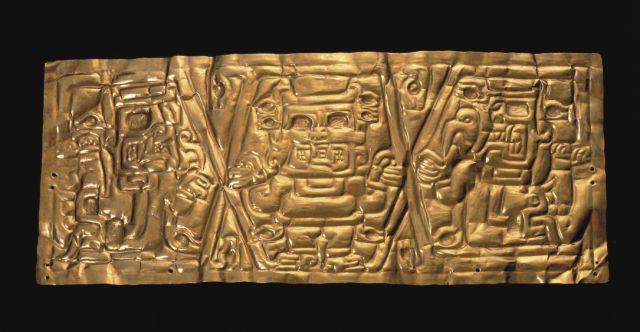
Chavín Gold Crown Formative Epoch 1200–300 BCE (Larco Museum Collection, Lima)

The Chavín culture is thought to have been primarily a religious movement. The culture apparently began in the Peruvian highlands and then spread outward throughout the country. The Chavín culture has very distinctive art styles, particularly in effigy pots, a number of which were in feline shapes. Chavin de Huantar was an important ritual centre for Chavin Culture, dating to around 1,500 BCE.

=== Nazca ===
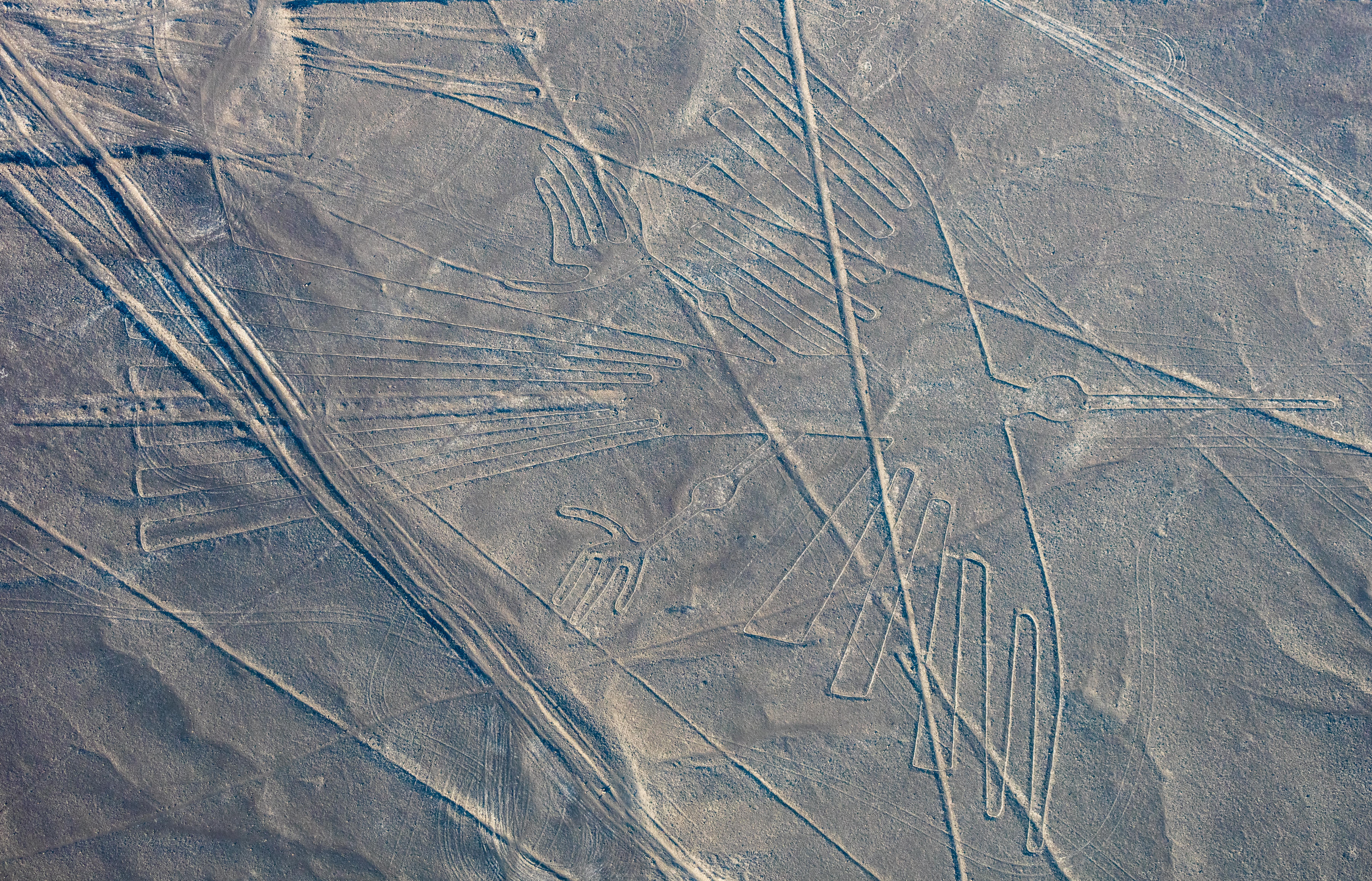
The Condor, Nazca Lines, created by the Nazca culture

The Nazca culture (also Nasca) was the archaeological culture that flourished from 100 to 800 CE beside the dry southern coast of Peru in the river valleys of the Rio Grande de Nazca drainage and the Ica Valley (Silverman and Proulx, 2002). Having been heavily influenced by the preceding Paracas culture, which was known for extremely complex textiles, the Nazca produced an array of beautiful crafts and technologies such as ceramics, textiles, and geoglyphs (most commonly known as the Nazca lines). They also built an impressive system of underground aqueducts, known as puquios, that still function today. The Nazca Province in the Ica Region was named for this people.

=== Moche ===
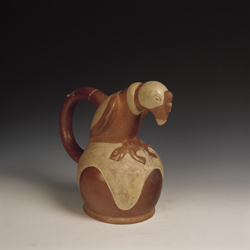
The Moche culture is world-renowned for its pottery, in picture a Condor from about 300 CE.

The Moche civilization (alternately, the Mochica culture, Early Chimu, Pre-Chimu, Proto-Chimu, etc.) flourished in northern Peru from about 100 CE to 800 CE, during the Regional Development Epoch. While this issue is the subject of some debate, many scholars contend that the Moche were not politically organized as a monolithic empire or state. Rather, they were likely a group of autonomous polities that shared a common elite culture, as seen in the rich iconography and monumental architecture that survive today. They are particularly noted for their elaborately painted ceramics, gold work, monumental constructions (huacas) and irrigation systems. Pottery has been the distinguishing feature of the Moche culture for many reasons. It is known for being highly uniform and decorated and led people to believe the Moche had been part of a corporate state system.

Moche history may be broadly divided into three periods – the emergence of the Moche culture in Early Moche (CE 100–300), its expansion and florescence during Middle Moche (CE 300–600), and the urban nucleation and subsequent collapse in Late Moche (CE 500–750).

=== Chachapoyas ===
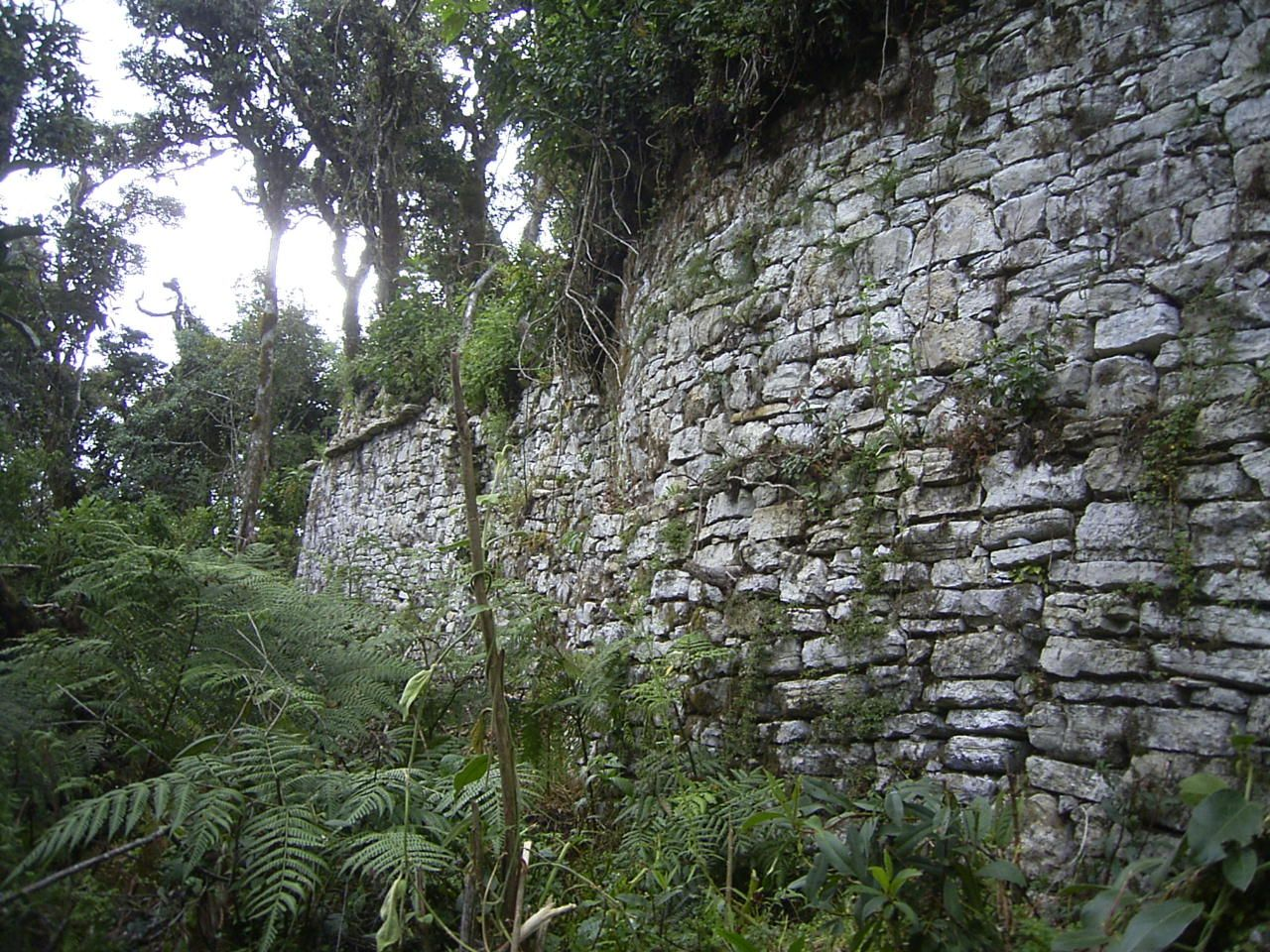
Walls of Soloco fortress, Chachapoyas, Peru.

The Chachapoyas, or the 'Cloud People', were an Andean civilization living in cloud forests of the Amazonas region of present-day northern Peru. The Incas conquered the Chachapoyas shortly before the arrival of the Spanish in Peru. The first firm evidence of their existence dates back to around 700 CE, although it is possible that they built a settlement called Gran Pajáten where some ceramics have been dated to 200 BCE. The largest Chacapoyan site discovered so far is Kuelap. A number of mummified burial sites have also been discovered.

=== Wari ===
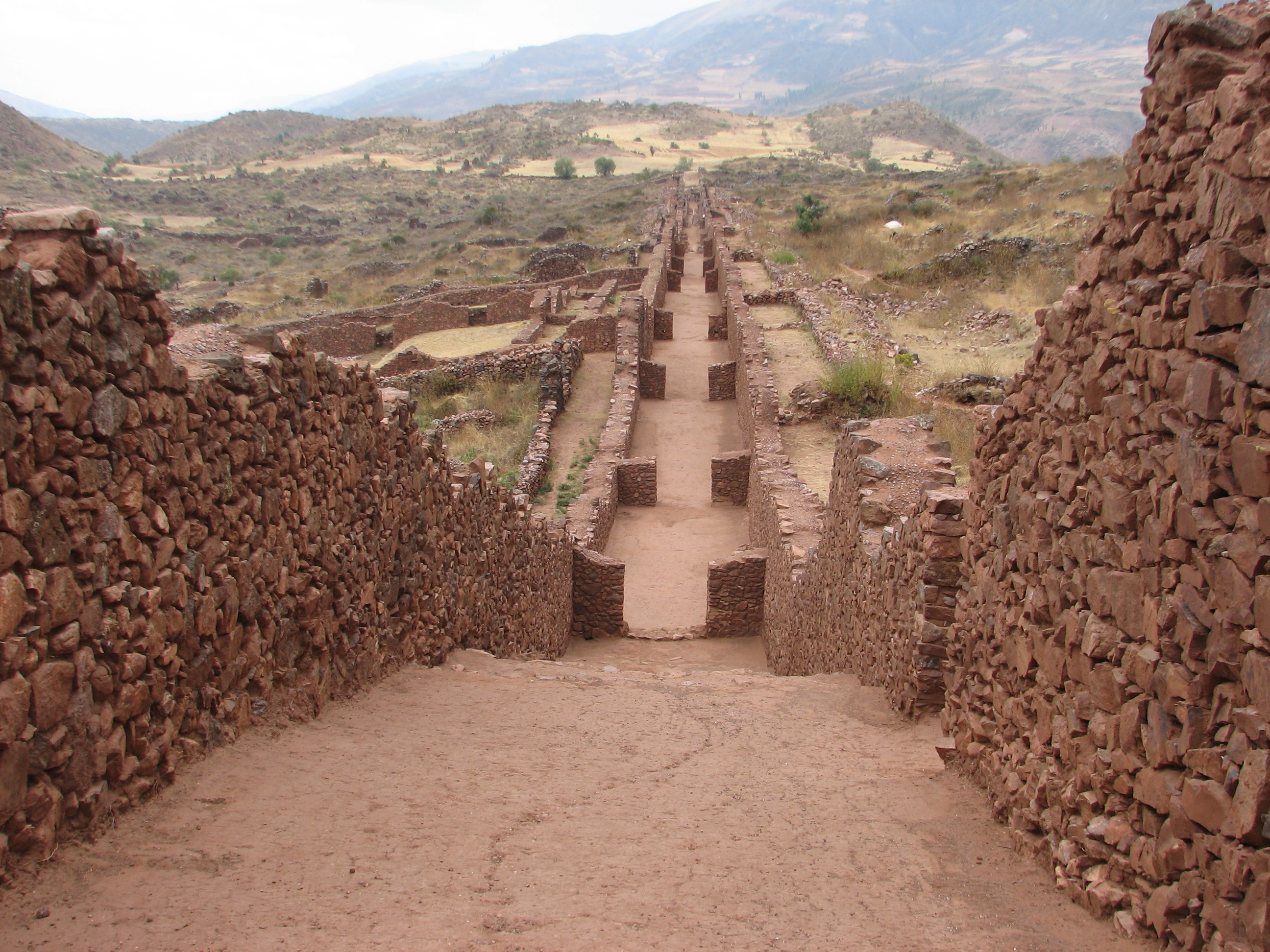
Pikillaqta administrative center, built by the Wari civilization in Cusco

The Wari (Spanish: Huari) were a Middle Horizon civilization that flourished in the south-central Andes and coastal area of Peru, from about CE 500 to 1000. (The Wari culture is not to be confused with the modern ethnic group and language known as Wari', with which it has no known link.) Wari, as the former capital city was called, is located 11 km (6.8 mi) north-east of the city of Ayacucho. This city was the center of a civilization that covered much of the highlands and coast of Peru. The best-preserved remnants, beside the Wari Ruins, are the recently discovered Northern Wari ruins near the city of Chiclayo, and Cerro Baul in Moquegua. Also well-known are the Wari ruins of Pikillaqta ("Flea Town"), a short distance south-east of Cuzco en route to Lake Titicaca.

=== Tiwanaku ===
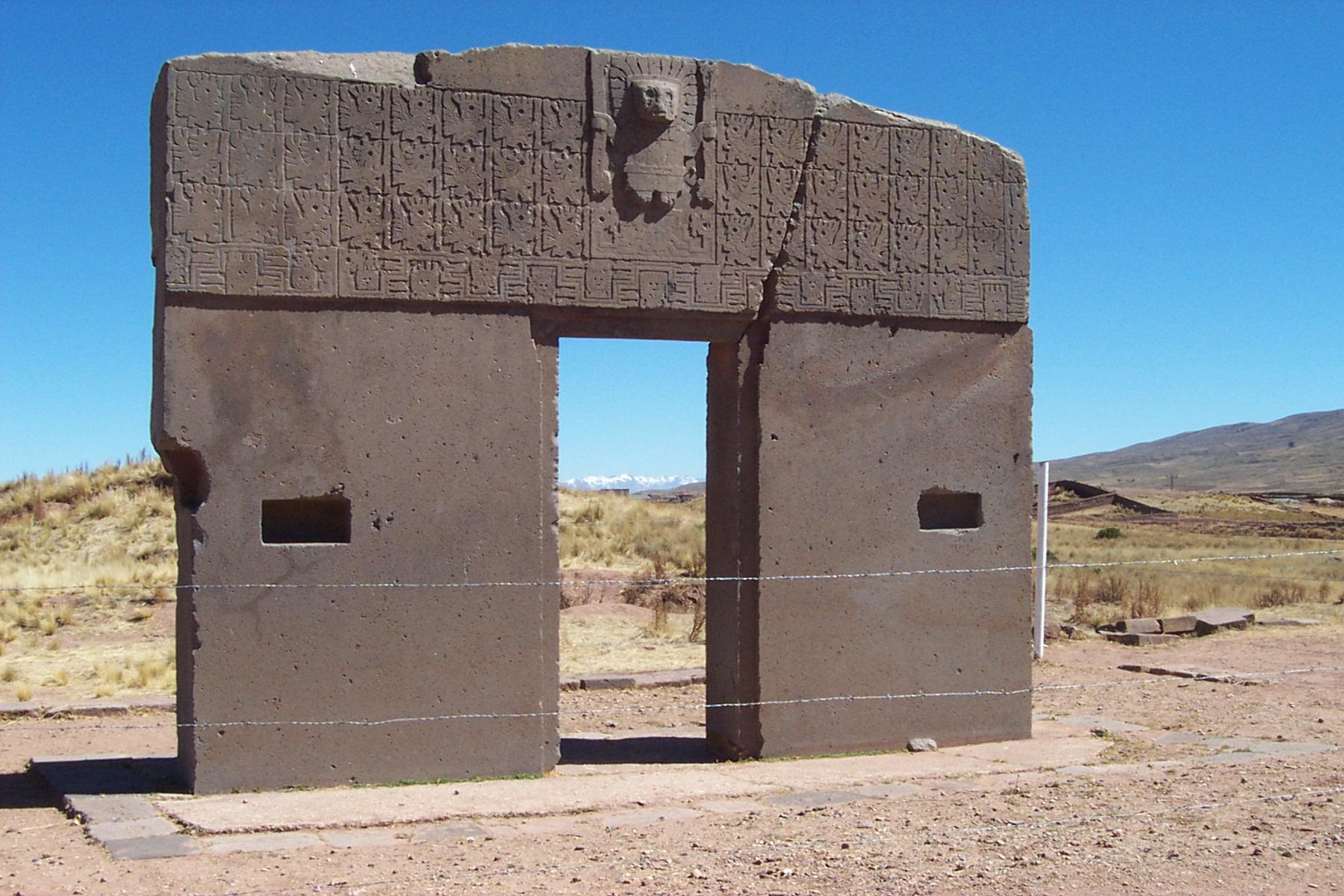
The "Gate of the Sun" built by the Tiwanaku culture

Tiwanaku (Spanish: Tiahuanaco and Tiahuanacu) is an important Pre-Columbian archaeological site in western Bolivia, South America. Tiwanaku is recognized by Andean scholars as one of the most important precursors to the Inca Empire, flourishing as the ritual and administrative capital of a major state power for approximately five hundred years. The ruins of the ancient city state are near the south-eastern shore of Lake Titicaca in the La Paz Department, Ingavi Province, Tiwanaku Municipality, about 72 km (45 mi) west of La Paz. The site was first recorded in written history by Spanish conquistador and self-acclaimed "first chronicler of the Indies" Pedro Cieza de León. Leon stumbled upon the remains of Tiwanaku in 1549 while searching for the Inca capital Qullasuyu. Some have hypothesized that Tiwanaku's modern name is related to the Aymara term taypiqala, meaning "stone in the center", alluding to the belief that it lay at the center of the world. However, the name by which Tiwanaku was known to its inhabitants may have been lost, as the people of Tiwanaku had no written language.

== Historical cultures ==
=== Chimú ===
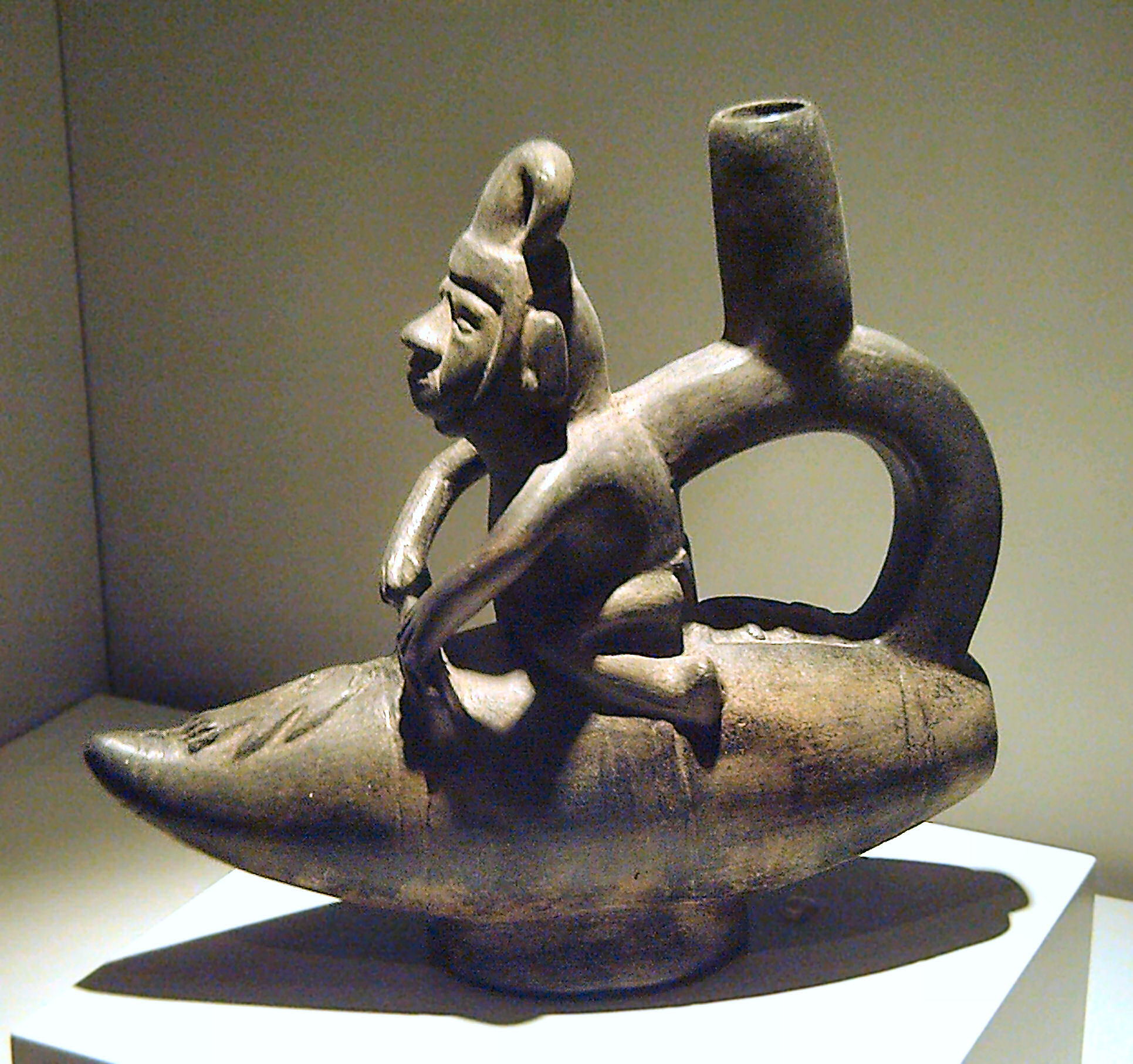
Chimú vessel representing a fisherman on a caballitos de totora (1100–1400 CE)

The Chimú were the residents of Chimor, with its capital at the city of Chan Chan, a large adobe city in the Moche Valley of present-day Trujillo, Peru. The culture arose about 900 CE. The Inca ruler Topa Inca Yupanqui led a campaign which conquered the Chimú around 1470 CE.

This was just fifty years before the arrival of the Spanish in the region. Consequently, Spanish chroniclers were able to record accounts of Chimú culture from individuals who had lived before the Inca conquest. Similarly, archaeological evidence suggest Chimor grew out of the remnants of Moche culture; early Chimú pottery had some resemblance to that of the Moche. Their ceramics are all black, and their work in precious metals is very detailed and intricate.

=== Aymara kingdoms ===
The Aymara kingdoms were a group of lordships located in the Altiplano. The kingdoms were established around 1151 after the collapse of the Tiwanaku Empire until they were absorbed into the Inca Empire in 1477.

=== Inca Empire ===
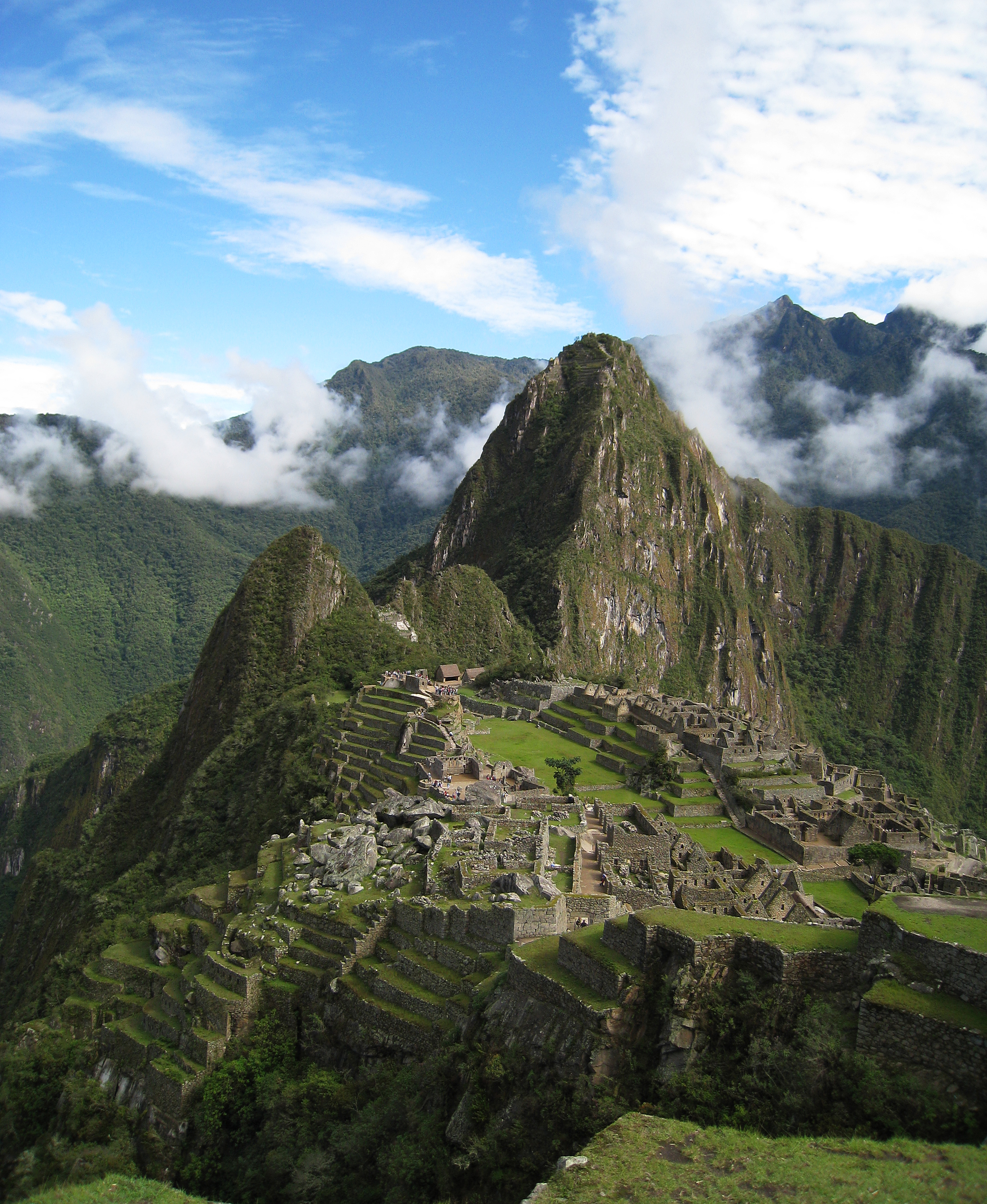
View of Machu Picchu built by the Incas

The Inca Empire, or Incan Empire (Quechua: Tawantinsuyu), was the largest empire in pre-Columbian America. The administrative, political and military center of the empire was located in Cusco. The Inca civilization arose from the Peruvian highlands sometime in the early 13th century, and the last Inca stronghold was conquered by the Spanish in 1572. From 1438 to 1533 CE, the Incas used a variety of methods, from conquest to peaceful assimilation, to incorporate a large portion of western South America, centered on the Andean mountain ranges, including Peru, southwest Ecuador, western and south central Bolivia, northwest Argentina, northern Chile, and a small part of southwest Colombia into a state comparable to the historical empires of the Old World.

=== Diaguita ===
The Diaguita culture formed in 1000 CE after emerging from the Las Ánimas culture. The Calchaquí tribe fought against expansion by both the Inca Empire and the Spanish Empire until they surrendered to Spanish rule after their defeat in the Calchaquí Wars in 1665.

=== Muisca ===
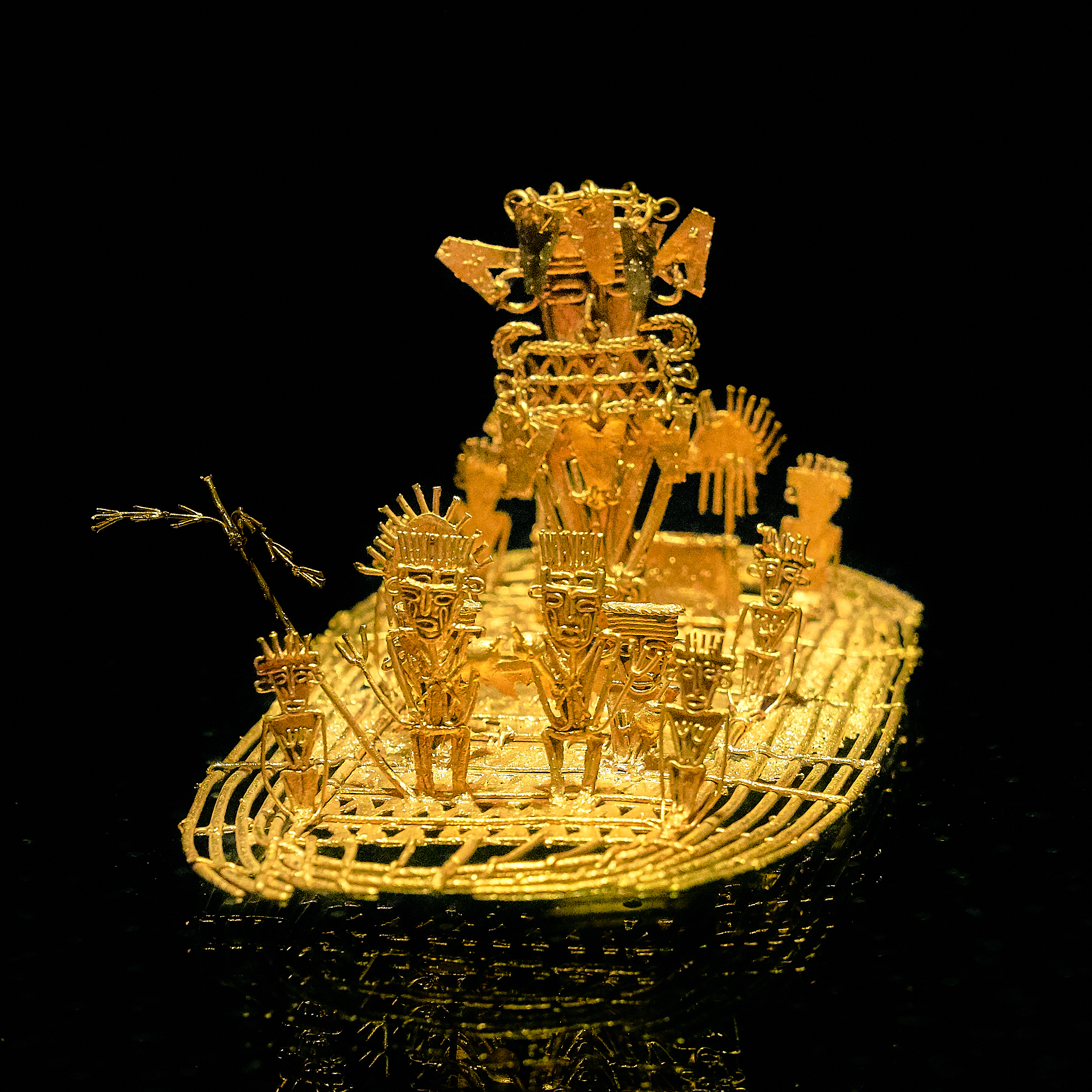
La balsa Muisca (The Muisca raft), a pre-Columbian gold sculpture representing the Muisca's offerings of gold in the Guatavita Lake

The Muisca was the Chibcha-speaking people that formed the Muisca Confederation in the central highlands of present-day Colombia. They were encountered by the troops of Gonzalo Jiménez de Quesada, in name of the Spanish Empire at the time of the conquest in the spring of 1537. The Muisca comprised two confederations: Hunza (present-day Tunja) was located in the northern area, whose sovereign was the zaque; and Bacatá the southern area, whose sovereign was the zipa. Both confederations were located in the highlands of modern-day Cundinamarca and Boyacá (Altiplano Cundiboyacense) in the central area of Colombia's Eastern Ranges.

=== Timoto-Cuica ===
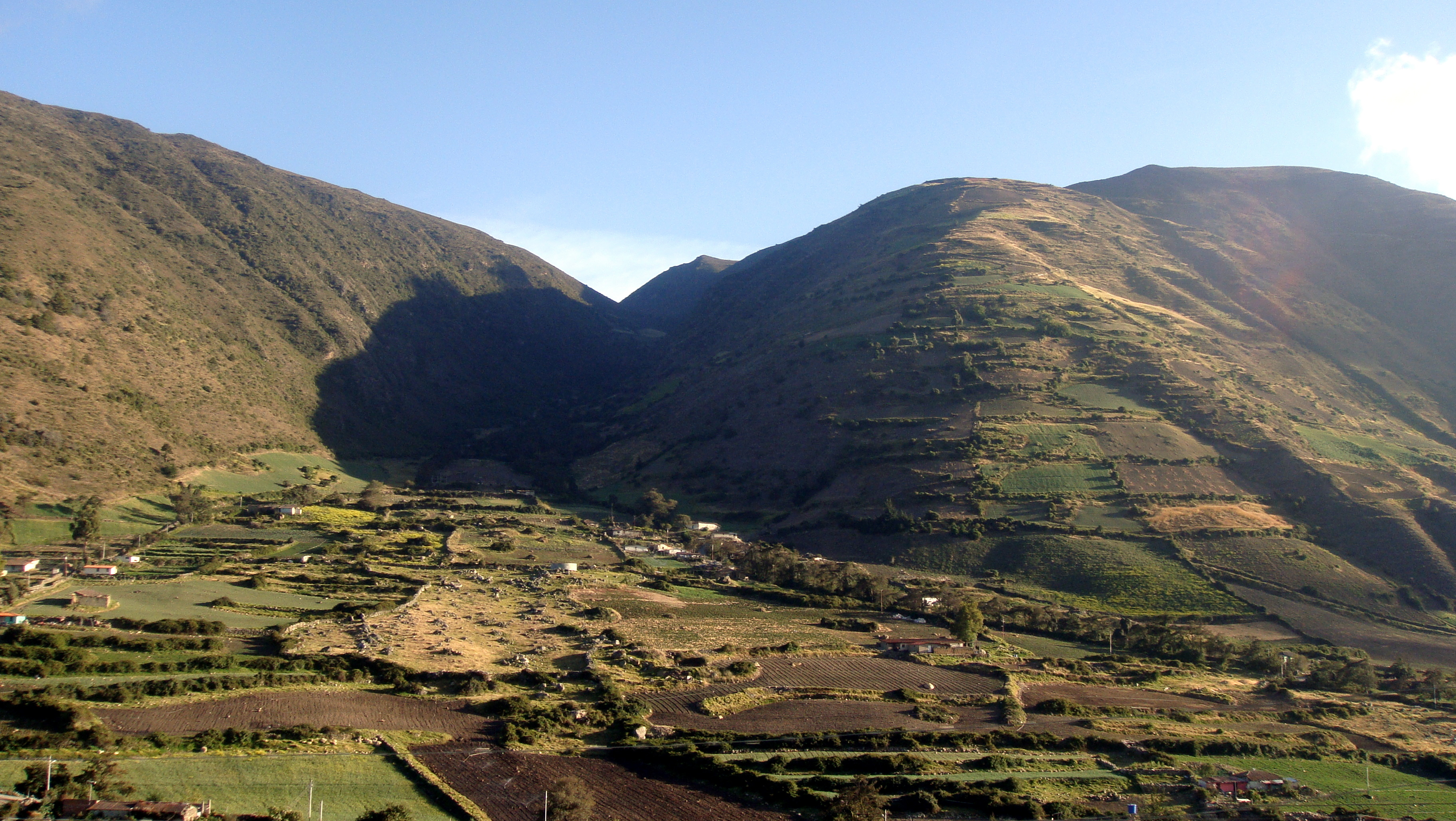
Timoto-Cuica territory in present-day Mérida, Venezuela

Timoto–Cuica people was composed primarily of two tribes, the Timotes and the Cuicas, that inhabited in the Andean region of western Venezuela. They were closely related to the Muisca people of the Andes, who spoke a Chibcha language. The Timoto-Cuicas were not only composed of the Timoto and the Cuica tribes, but also the Mucuchíes, the Migures, the Tabares, and the Mucuñuques. Timoto-Cuica society was complex with pre-planned permanent villages, surrounded by irrigated, terraced fields. They also stored water in tanks.Their houses were made primarily of stone and wood with thatched roofs.

They were peaceful, for the most part, and depended on growing crops. Regional crops included potatoes and ullucos. They left behind works of art, particularly anthropomorphic ceramics, but no major monuments. They spun vegetable fibers to weave into textiles and mats for housing. They are credited with having invented the arepa, a staple in Venezuelan and Colombian cuisine.

== Gallery ==
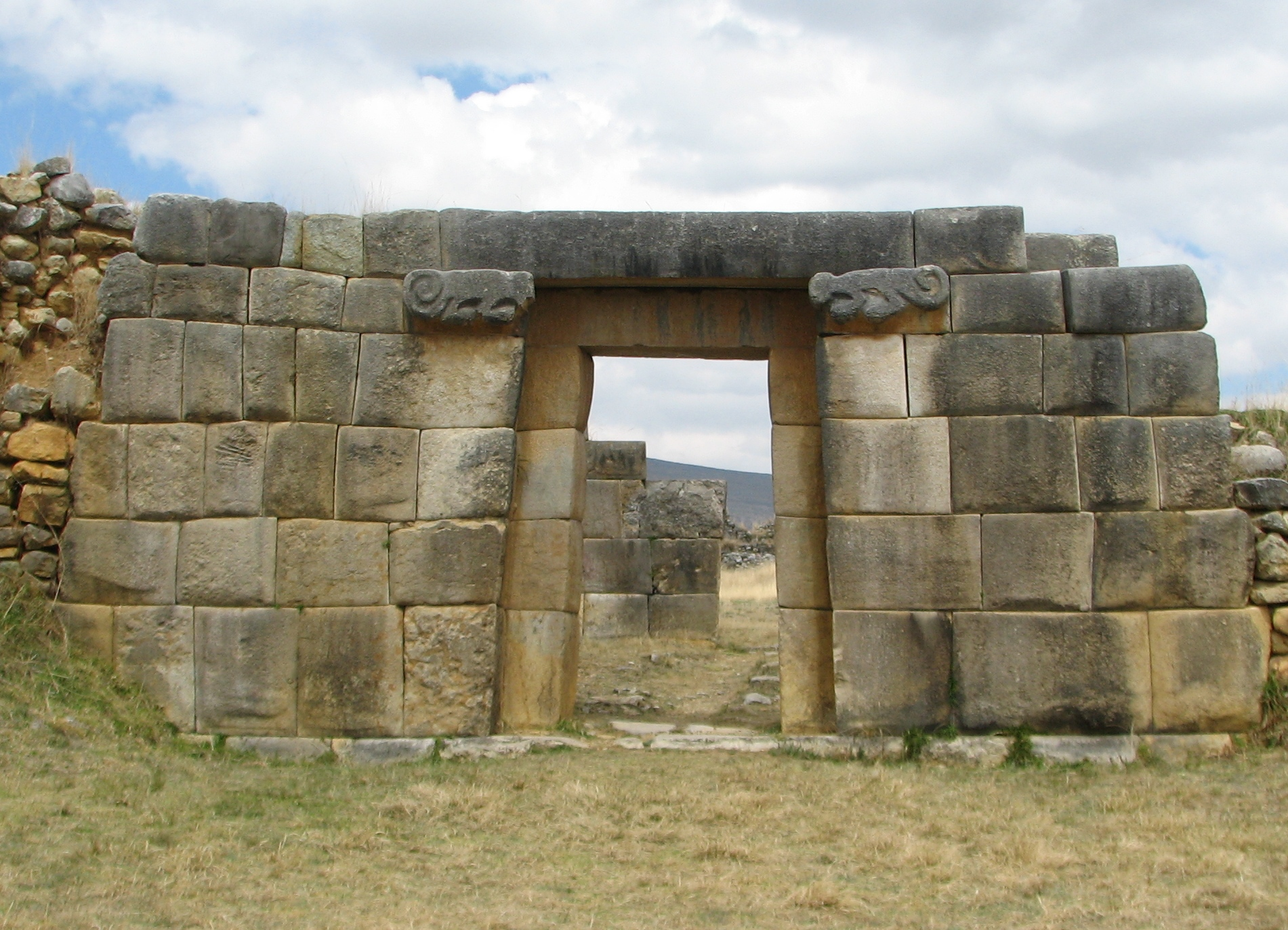
Cover of Huánuco Pampa

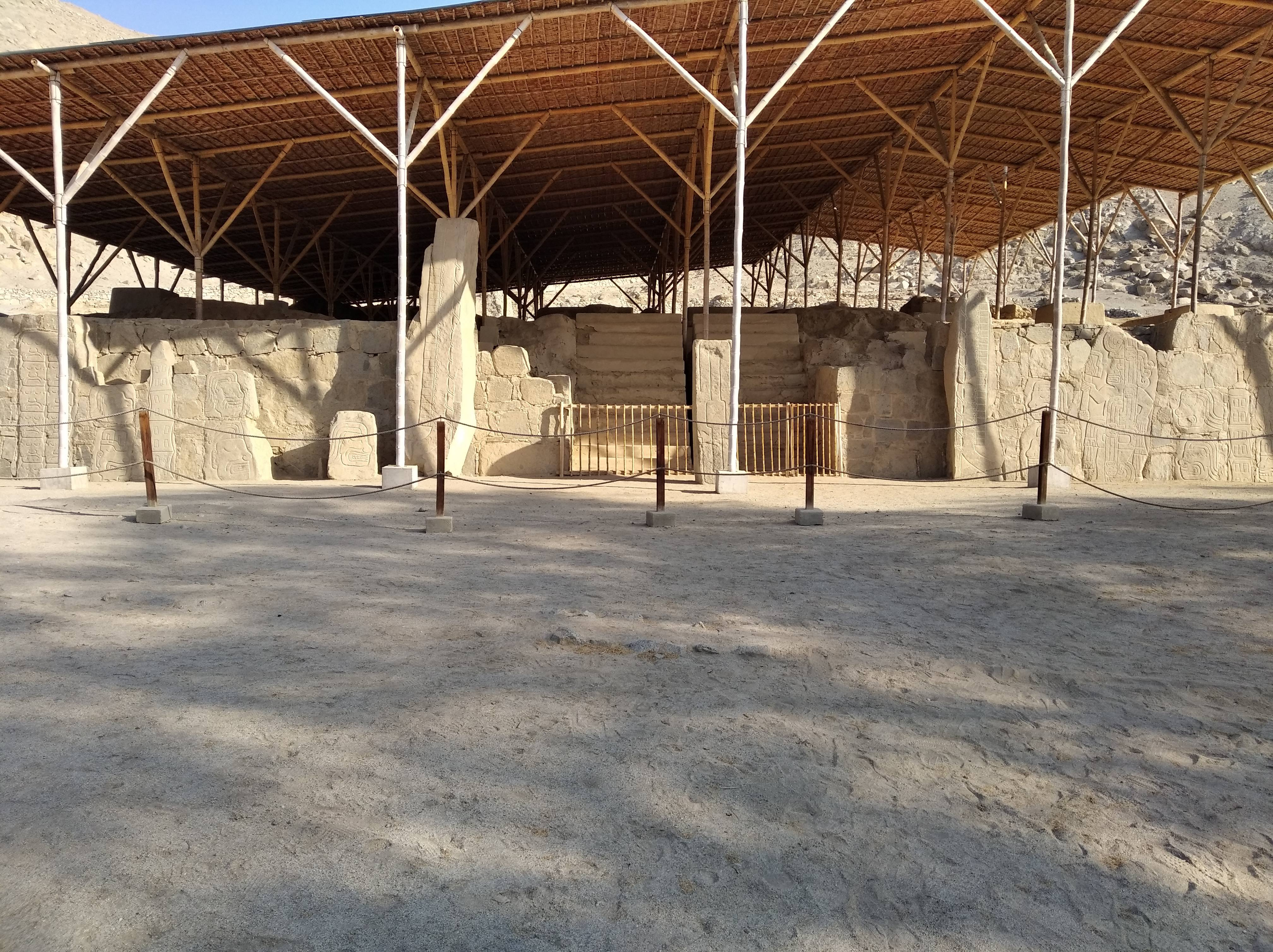
Facade of the main temple of Cerro Sechín

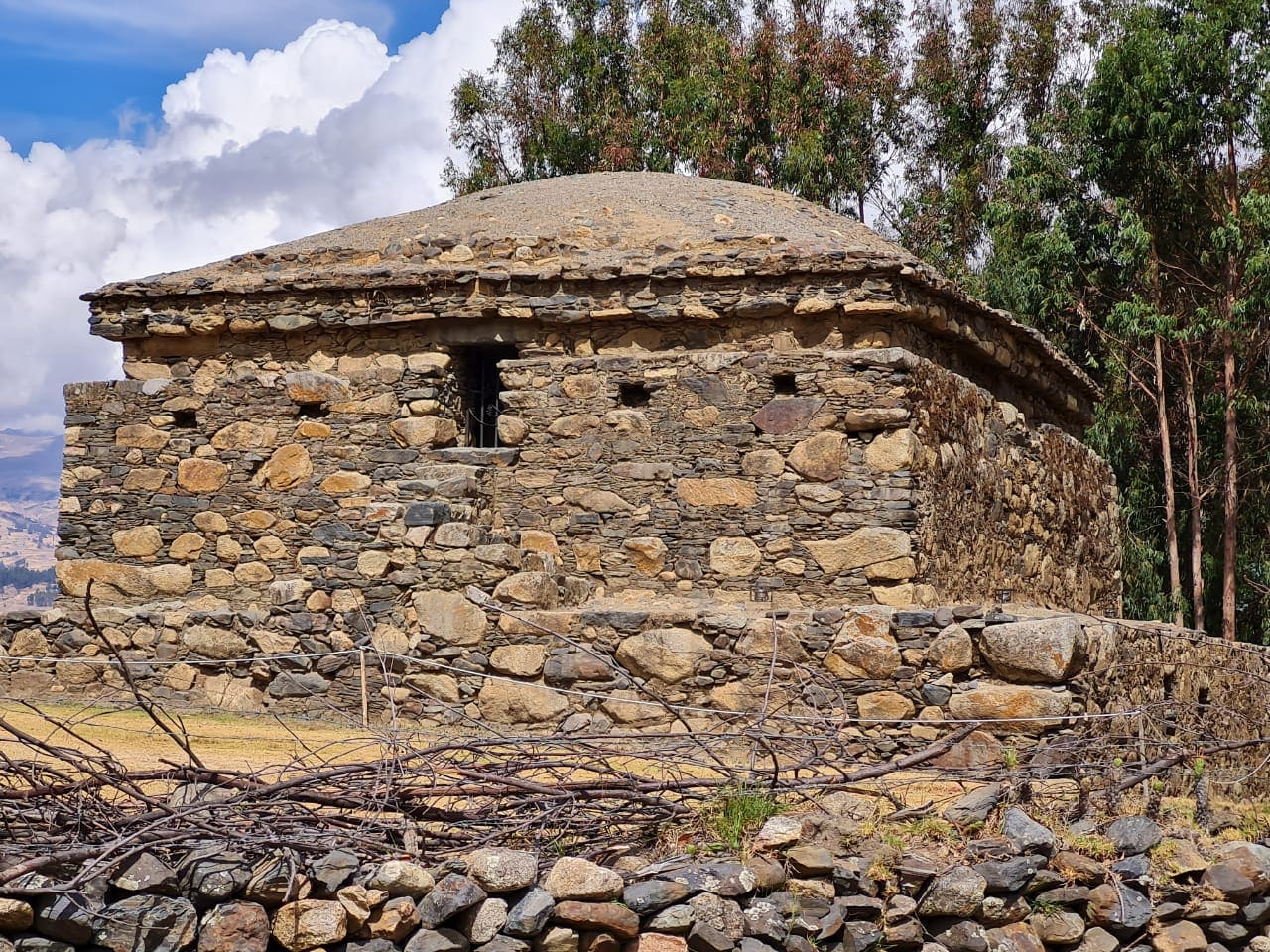
Mausoleum in Huilcahuaín

== See also ==
- History of Argentina
- History of Bolivia
- History of Chile
- History of Colombia
- History of Ecuador
- History of South America
- History of Peru
- Periodization of Pre-Columbian Peru
- Amazonas before the Inca Empire
- Guaman Poma
- Pambokancha (religious site)
- Population history of American indigenous peoples
- Tumi
- Quechua people
- Kogi people
- Spanish conquest of the Inca Empire
