= Real Alto =

Archaeological site in Chanduy Valley, Ecuador

- Location within Ecuador
- 2°21′55″S 80°39′13″W
- Type: Settlement
- Cultures: Las Vegas culture; Valdivia culture
- Location: Chanduy Valley, between Guayaquil and Salinas
- Region: Santa Elena, Ecuador

History
- Built: c. 6000 BC
- Abandoned: c. 3800 BC

Site notes
- Excavation dates: 1971–present
- Archaeologists: Jorge Marcos

Real Alto is an archaeological site in Chanduy valley of Ecuador, located between the cities Guayaquil and Salinas. It was settled between 6000 and 3800 BC.

The site was first identified by archeologist Jorge Marcos in 1971. Since then, it was investigated by a number of researchers.

Real Alto is helping to clarify the nature of the apparent time gap between the very early Las Vegas culture and the later Valdivia culture. In 2016, new radiocarbon dates were published that place Las Vegas culture at 10,800–6600 BP (8,800–4600 BC), and the start of Valdivia culture at 5600 BP (3600 BC). So the Real Alto culture is now considered to belong to the period between these two cultures.

Around 2500 BCE, the town belonged to the Valdivia culture. At that time, the population grew to about 1,250 individuals. The settlement featured two plazas and two ceremonial mounds.

One of their food crops was Calathea allouia.

== Museum ==
Real Alto museum is open to the public. It is located in Chanduy, a suburb of Santa Elena. The museum has a laboratory, and a dining room open to the public.

== See also ==
- Las Vegas culture (archaeology)

== Bibliography ==
- Karol Chandler-Ezell, Deborah M. Pearsall, James A. Zeidler, "Root and Tuber Phytoliths and Starch Grains Document Manioc (Manihot Esculenta), Arrowroot (Maranta Arundinacea), and Llerén (Calathea sp.) at the Real Alto Site, Ecuador" in Economic Botany vol. 60 (2006) pp. 103-120
- Deborah M. Pearsall, "Plant Food Resources of the Ecuadorian Formative: An Overview and Comparison to the Central Andes" in J. Scott Raymond, Richard L. Burger, edd., Archaeology of Formative Ecuador (Vasingtoniae: Dumbarton Oaks, 2003) p. 213 ff.
- Deborah M. Pearsall, Karol Chandler-Ezell, James A. Zeidler, "Maize in ancient Ecuador: Results of residue analysis of stone tools from the Real Alto site" in Journal of Archaeological Science vol. 31 (2004) pp. 423–442
- Peter W. Stahl, "The Zooarchaeological Record from Formative Ecuador" in J. Scott Raymond, Richard L. Burger, edd., Archaeology of Formative Ecuador (Vasingtoniae: Dumbarton Oaks, 2003) p. 175 ff.
- Andrey V. Tabarev, Yoshitaka Kanomata, Jorge G. Marcos, Alexander N. Popov, Boris V. Lazin, "Insights into the Earliest Formative Period of Coastal Ecuador: New Evidence and Radiocarbon Dates from the Real Alto Site" in Radiocarbon vol. 58 (2016) pp. 323-330 Epitome
- Douglas H. Ubelaker, "Health Issues in the Early Formative of Ecuador: Skeletal Biology of Real Alto" in J. Scott Raymond, Richard L. Burger, edd., Archaeology of Formative Ecuador (Vasingtoniae: Dumbarton Oaks, 2003) p. 261 ff.
