= Venus Figurines from Valdivia =

Native culture figurines from early America

From the Valdivia site over seventy fragments and one complete figure of these female statuettes have been found. These figurines measure anywhere from 4.6 cm to 8.8 cm when complete in form.

== Appearance and Construction ==
Early figurative sculptures from Valdivia were vague outlines of human forms without gender or individualized features. As time went on, figurines were given more details and the signature coiffures of the Venus figurines as well as breasts or suggestions of pregnancy appeared. This higher level of detail was made possible when the carvers began to sculpt stone slabs and incise finer details into the figurines.

The figurines are simple and compact in style with very few marks made to identify as facial features. Perhaps the most individualizing aspect of these figurines is the elaborate hairstyles for each individual figurine. Some hairstyles even eclipse other features of the woman such as her face and chin, clearly taking preference over other aspects of her form.

The construction of these figurines was as simple as their compact appearance. The women's body and head were formed by two coils, and then the larger details such as face, breasts, and arms were added with additional coils of clay. Gashes to mimic eyebrows, eyes, and a mouth were included while the clay was still wet. As a final step, the creators then waited for the material to dry and then added the coiffure hairdo. However, since the clay was almost completely dry at this point, the final hairpiece tended to fall off.

=== Intersex attributes ===
While most figurines were obviously female with protruding breasts and feminine coiffures, a few figurines have "...a small conical projection..." in the pubic area. Some scholars such as Evans and Meggers suggest that this symbolizes intersexuality, and the inclusion of other female aspects such as curvy hips and large breasts supports this theory.

== Purpose ==
While their true purpose remains elusive, scholars associate the Venus figurines with fertility and fertility rituals. However, it is possible to take this association a step further.

=== Shamanistic Practices ===
In Valdivian indigenous shamanistic practices, small human figurines are transformed into holy objects that possess the power to cure disease. It is possible that the Valdivian people may have created the figurines to "...serve a spiritual need, for a specific ritual or ceremonial event (most often assumed related to fertility), for a particular woman, or for the well-being of the home or community." These Venus figurines could very well have been used in household ceremonies and then thrown out after the ritual ended, and their discovery "...in ancient refuse heaps indicate[s] that they would 'outlive' their usefulness and be discarded." This ritualistic treatment is common within Andean shaman practices where "...spirits vivify and inhabit effigies.." and "...it is likely that when women who had a ritual intervention successfully got pregnant, the vehicle was necessarily destroyed."
