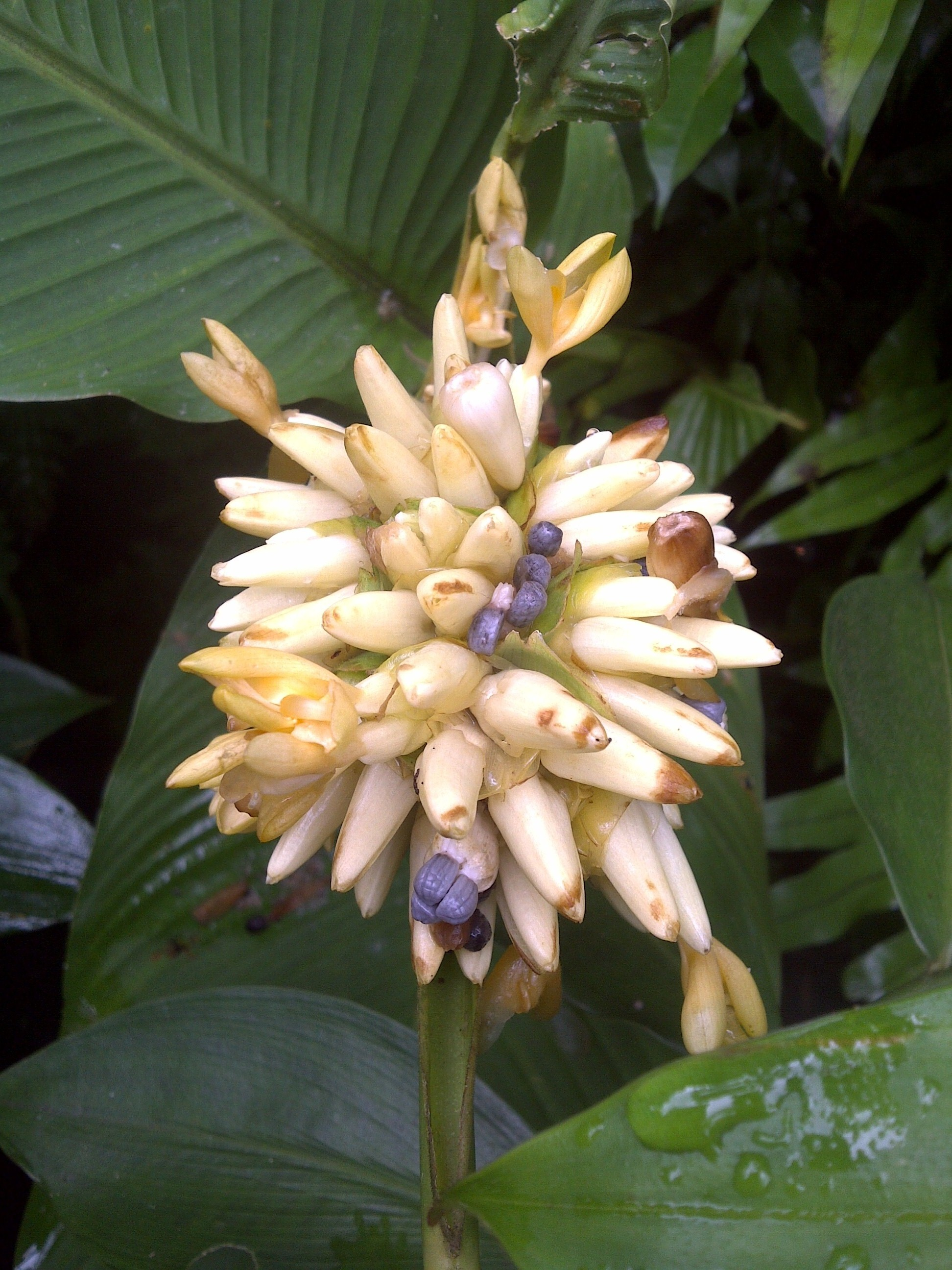

Scientific classification
- Kingdom: Plantae
- Clade: Tracheophytes
- Clade: Angiosperms
- Clade: Monocots
- Clade: Commelinids
- Order: Zingiberales
- Family: Marantaceae
- Genus: Goeppertia
- Species: G. allouia

Binomial name
- Goeppertia allouia Lindl.

Synonyms
- Allouya americana (Lam.) A.Chev.; Calathea allouia (Aubl.) Lindl.; Curcuma americana Lam.; Maranta allouia Aubl.; Maranta niveiflora A.Dietr.; Maranta semperflorens Horan.; Phrynium allouia (Aubl.) Roscoe; Phyllodes allouia (Aubl.) Kuntze

= Goeppertia allouia =

Lerén

Species of plant

Goeppertia allouia (syn. Calathea allouia), known as lerén or lairén in Spanish, and also known in English as Guinea arrowroot, and sweet corn root, is a plant in the arrowroot family, native to northern South America and the Caribbean. The name "allouia" is derived from the Carib name for the plant. Lerén is a minor food crop in the American tropics, but was one of the earliest plants domesticated by pre-historic Amerindians in South America.

== Distribution ==
Goeppertia allouia is native to Cuba, Hispaniola, Puerto Rico, the Lesser Antilles, Trinidad and Tobago, Venezuela, Colombia, Ecuador, Peru and Brazil. It is reportedly naturalized in Jamaica.

Lerén has been introduced as a minor root crop in tropical regions around the world.

== Description ==
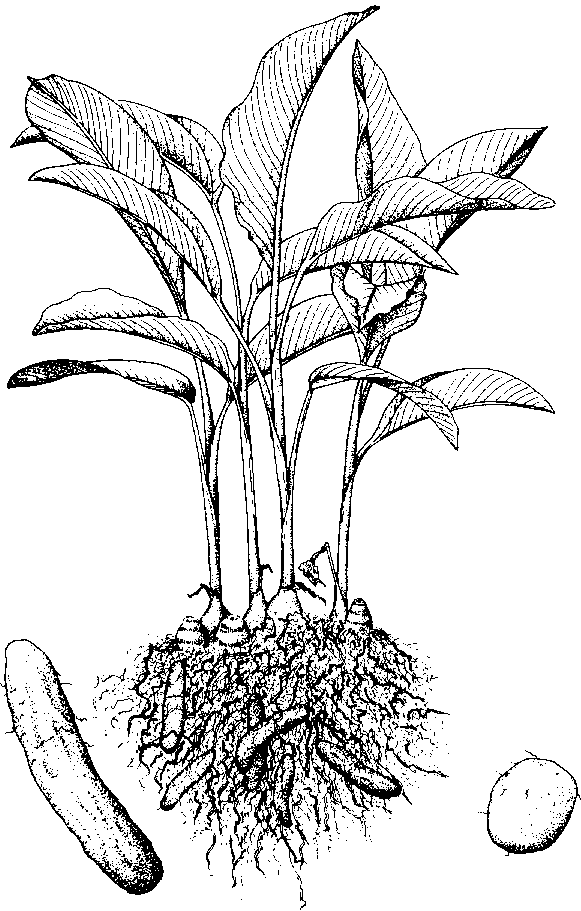
Lerén (Goeppertia allouia)

Lerén is a perennial plant, approximately 1 metre (39 in) in height. It produces egg-shaped tuberous roots 2 centimetres (0.79 in) to 8 centimetres (3.1 in) long at the end of fibrous roots. The leaves are large, up to 60 centimetres (24 in) long and 20 centimetres (7.9 in) wide. Indigenous people of the Americas have used the durable leaves to make traditional medicines and as baby clothing. Lerén usually reproduces itself through rhizomes which produce shoots and new plants.

== Cultivation ==
Lerén is adapted to a tropical climate with alternating rainy and dry seasons. It sprouts with the first rains and grows rapidly, forming tubers which are harvested as the foliage begins to die back eight or nine months after the initial sprouting. The rhizomes, harvested at the same time, are tolerant of both drying and flooding, and divided and replanted again at the onset of the rainy season. Frequent irrigation is necessary during dry periods. Lerén is often planted in shade or partial shade but can grow in full sun with adequate moisture and nutrients.

Lerén is traditionally cultivated on a small scale. Its cultivation is declining as it has been replaced by other crops.

== Food ==
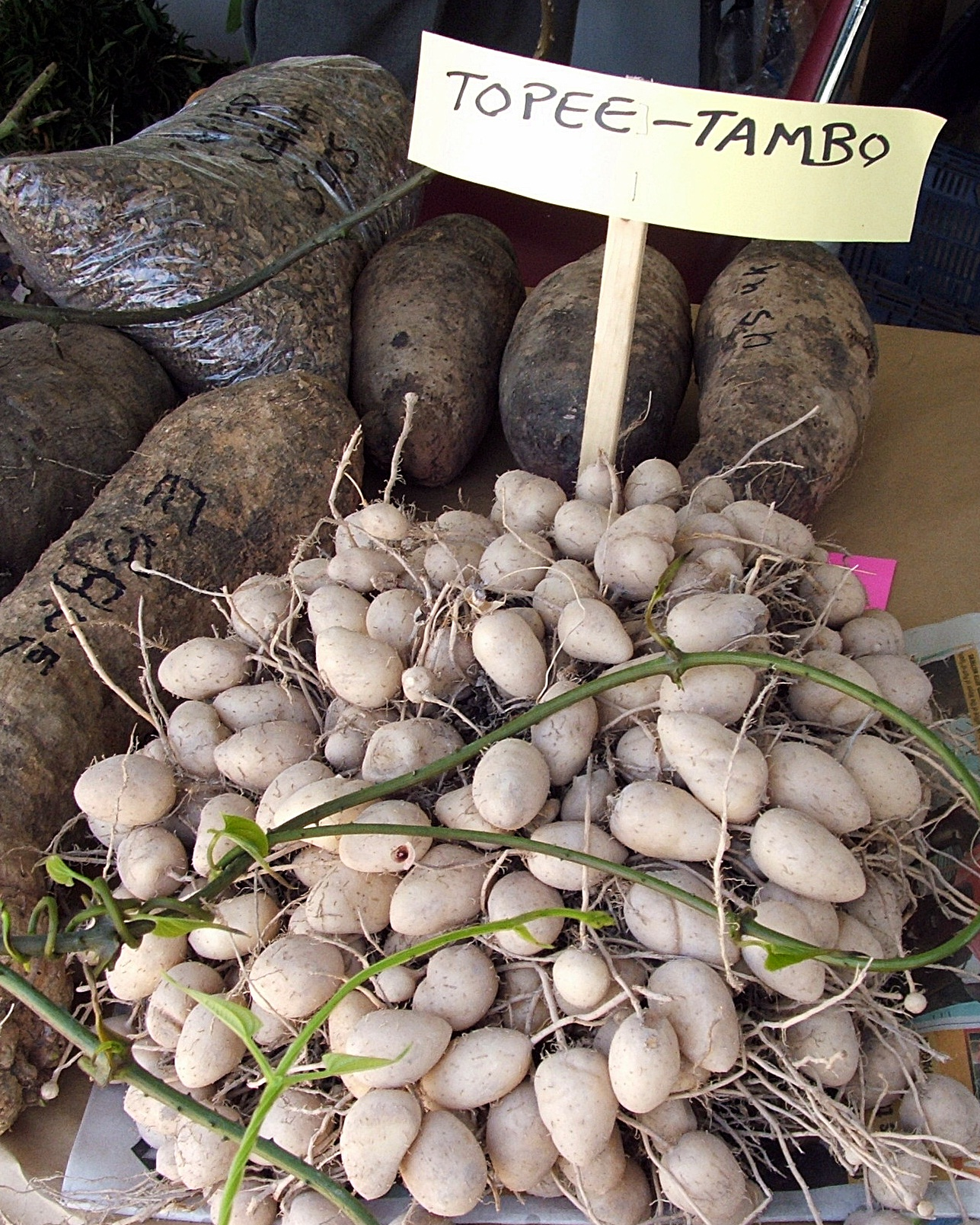
Lerén is called "topee-tambo" in Trinidad and Tobago.

Lerén is usually cooked by boiling the tubers for 15 to 60 minutes, As food, lerén is often compared to water chestnut (Eleocharis dulcis) because lerén, like the water chestnut, retains its crispness despite being cooked. Boiled lerén has a taste similar to sweet corn, hence one of its common English names. The cooked tuber is covered with a thin, edible skin which is most easily peeled after cooking. Lerén is mostly eaten as an hors d'oeuvre or appetizer. Lerén tubers can be stored at room temperatures for up to three months, but do not tolerate refrigeration well.

The nutritional value of lerén has not been thoroughly studied, but the tubers have a starch content of 13-15 percent and a protein content of 6.6 percent.

== Prehistoric domestication ==
Archaeologists have discovered that lerén was one of the first plants domesticated in prehistoric South America. Lerén, along with arrowroot (Maranta arundinacea), squash (Cucurbita moschata), and bottle gourd (Lagenaria siceraria) were being eaten and possibly cultivated in Colombia by about 9000 BCE. It appears that the cultivation of lerén spread to places where it was not likely native. For example, the people of the Las Vegas culture on the arid and semi-arid Santa Elena Peninsula of Ecuador likely grew lerén by about 9000 BCE. Lerén was being grown to be eaten raw, dried, or ground into flour.
