= Las Vegas culture (archaeology) =

Large number of Archaic settlements

Las Vegas
- Location of the Las Vegas culture in Ecuador
- Geographical range: Santa Elena Peninsula
- Period: Archaic
- Dates: c. 8000 – 4600 BCE
- Type site: Site No. 80
- Followed by: Valdivia culture

The Las Vegas culture was a pre-ceramic society that inhabited the Santa Elena Peninsula on the coast of present-day Ecuador between approximately 8000 and 4600 BCE. Named after the prominent Site No. 80 near the Las Vegas River, now within the city of Santa Elena, it represents one of the earliest sedentary adaptations to a complex coastal environment in South America. The culture is notable for its early experimentation with agriculture, including the domestication of squash, bottle gourd, and later maize, alongside a subsistence strategy based on hunting, fishing, and foraging. Archaeological evidence from at least 32 sites, including one of the largest known burial grounds in South America, provides insight into the Las Vegas people's social organization, settlement patterns, and adaptation to environmental changes such as rising sea levels.

== Setting ==
The Las Vegas culture flourished on the coast of Ecuador along the Santa Elena Peninsula from approximately 8000 to 4600 BCE. As one of the earliest known settlements in Ecuador, it is significant for its early domestication of plants like squash and maize and for containing one of the largest preceramic burial sites in South America, with remains of at least 192 individuals.

The Santa Elena Peninsula forms the northernmost part of a coastal desert that stretches for some 3,000 kilometres (1,900 mi) along South America's Pacific coast. The regional climate is arid, with the city of Santa Elena receiving only about 250 millimetres (9.8 in) of precipitation annually, almost entirely between January and March. Influenced by the cool Humboldt Current, temperatures are mild, averaging 23 °C (73 °F) with minimal seasonal variation. The natural coastal vegetation is xeric, dominated by cacti and other desert plants. Inland, precipitation increases, and the landscape transitions from desert to seasonally dry forest.

Ten thousand years ago, sea levels around the peninsula were about 30 metres (98 ft) lower than today. Consequently, known Las Vegas settlements were located further inland, and some ancient sites have likely been submerged by subsequent sea-level rise. The dry climate and xeric vegetation appear to have persisted throughout this period. Sea levels began rising around 7000 years ago, reducing the habitable land area. This environmental shift, along with tectonic activity, affected the subsistence patterns of the Las Vegas people, as evidenced by dietary changes between the early and late phases. Faunal and plant remains, including grasses and shrubs indicative of a dry climate, suggest a forested environment that was not wet enough to become a wetland forest. The prolonged annual dry season is typical of regions suitable for maize cultivation. These conditions—rising seas and a seasonal dry climate—may have motivated the Las Vegas people to intensify plant domestication and marine resource gathering.

Archaeologists have identified thirty-two Las Vegas sites scattered across the peninsula, primarily along the Rio Grande and its tributaries, including the Las Vegas River, within an area of about 25 kilometres (16 mi) east-west by 12 kilometres (7.5 mi) north-south. Additional contemporary sites likely remain undiscovered along hundreds of miles of the Ecuadorian coast.

Before the sea-level rise, the coastline supported mangrove swamps, and mangrove clams were a staple of the Las Vegas diet. As sea levels rose, the mangroves declined, and after approximately 6000 BCE, mangrove clams significantly decreased in Las Vegas archaeological assemblages.

A contemporaneous ancient culture in the region was the Real Alto culture, which existed between 6000 and 3800 BCE.

== Description ==
Evidence of a human presence on the Santa Elena Peninsula dates to 8800 BCE, but the archaeological record becomes substantially more extensive with the onset of the Las Vegas period around 8000 BCE. Archaeologists divide the culture into two phases: Early Las Vegas (8000–6000 BCE) and Late Las Vegas (6000–4600 BCE), with the division marked by a gap in the stratigraphic record at a key site. The culture was pre-ceramic, meaning its people did not produce or use pottery.

Sites were typically established on low hills in areas that provided access to both marine and terrestrial resources. Analysis of faunal remains indicates the diet was split roughly equally between terrestrial and marine animal protein. Human remains from these sites suggest the population was generally healthy and showed no signs of anemia.

=== Early Las Vegas (8000–6000 BCE) ===
During the Early Las Vegas period, the primary social and economic unit was the small, relatively self-sufficient family. These family groups were flexibly organized to carry out a wide range of subsistence tasks using a few generalized tools. They lived in small, flimsy structures and likely moved between sites to exploit seasonal food sources. Their subsistence strategy was that of broad-spectrum hunters and gatherers, exploiting a variety of habitats including the desert, dry tropical forest, and Pacific coast. Hunted game included deer, peccary, rabbit, fox, rodents, opossum, and various reptiles and birds. Intertidal species and crabs were also harvested in small quantities. This diverse diet demonstrates a adaptive strategy that did not rely heavily on any single food source.

=== Late Las Vegas (6000–4600 BCE) ===
In the Late Las Vegas period, rising sea levels brought marine resources closer to established sites. Concurrently, large game became less prominent in the diet, either due to decreased abundance or shifting hunting practices. This shift may have motivated the Las Vegas people to adopt a more sedentary lifestyle to focus on more predictable resources, such as fish and shellfish, which became dietary staples. The use of offshore fish species suggests the development of boats.

This move toward sedentism was likely a key factor in the increased cultivation of plants. A more settled existence would have fostered stronger community bonds and increased reliance on collective labor for hunting, gathering, and tending crops. Food sharing within the community represents an early form of the reciprocity that became a hallmark of later Andean cultures.

Material culture included tools made from stone and bone, including points and a possible spatula that may have been used in net or textile production. They also utilized organic materials like shell, wood, bamboo, reeds, and bark to make tools and containers.

Burial customs changed significantly. Interments became centralized, occurring only at the two major sites (Sites 80 and 66/67), with remains transported there for burial or reburial. This practice suggests these sites had evolved into base camps and ceremonial centers, while smaller sites were occupied seasonally. The development of stronger community bonds is reflected in these formal burial practices. Most burials show evidence of complex rituals, including primary and secondary interments. In a typical primary burial, a corpse was placed in a flexed position; later, the bones were often exhumed and reinterred in a secondary burial.

== Agriculture ==
Despite the arid conditions and scarcity of surface water, the Las Vegas people were among the earliest in South America to practice agriculture. It did not replace their existing subsistence strategies but complemented a diet based on fishing, hunting, and foraging.

The earliest domesticated crops appear to have been bottle gourd (calabash) and leren (Calathea allouia), a tropical root crop not native to the peninsula, with evidence of cultivation dating to around 7000 BCE. A semi-domesticated variety of squash may have been cultivated even earlier, with phytolith evidence pushing its presence back to 8000 BCE. Perhaps most surprising is the early presence of maize, which originated in Mexico. Archaeological evidence indicates maize was being cultivated in the Las Vegas area by approximately 4600 BCE.

Subsequent research has suggested even earlier dates for plant cultivation. A 2008 study by Zarrillo et al. indicated that agriculture in the region began by approximately 9000 BCE, with maize present by 5500 BCE. As the study states:

"Maize was introduced to Ecuadorian coastal populations already familiar with plant cultivation. At the preceramic Vegas site (OGSE-80), phytolith assemblages, which included bottle gourd (Lagenaria spp.), the root crop llerén (Calathea spp.), and domesticated-size squash phytoliths, were directly dated to 11,210–9,900 cal B.P., with maize present in directly dated phytolith assemblages to ≈7500 cal B.P."

More recently, Piperno has reported dates for maize use by the Las Vegas culture at c. 8053-7818 cal. BP (approximately 6100-5870 BCE), further confirming its early introduction.

=== Other early maize in the area ===
The route of maize's dispersal in South America remains a subject of scholarly debate, specifically whether it was first introduced and cultivated in the lowlands, mid-elevations, or highlands.

Recent findings suggest maize was dispersed into the upper lowlands of northwest Colombia between 8997-8277 cal. BP, and into the mid-elevation forests of the Colombian Andes by 8000-7600 cal. BP.

In the 21st century, investigations at the Cubilán site in the Oña Canton of Ecuador's highlands provided the oldest evidence of maize in the South American highlands. Microbotanical studies recovered maize starches from stone tools in contexts dated to 8078-7959 cal. BP (approximately 6130-6010 BCE).

== End of Las Vegas ==
The archaeological record indicates a hiatus in human presence on the Santa Elena Peninsula for roughly a millennium after 4600 BCE. Around 3500 BCE, the Valdivia culture appears in the same region. The fate of the Las Vegas people remains unknown.
