= Santa Elena Peninsula =

Peninsula along the coast of central Ecuador

Coordinates: 2.1958°S 80.9838°W

The Santa Elena Peninsula is a peninsula in Santa Elena Province, Ecuador. The Santa Elena Peninsula contains the westernmost point on mainland Ecuador and is bordered by the Gulf of Guayaquil to the south and the Santa Elena Bay to the north.

The peninsula region is dry and contains resources such as salt mines and a significant oil field at Ancón. The settlement of Chinchipe is the closest settlement to the tip of the peninsula; it is served by Ecuador Highway 70, which extends to the tip of the peninsula.

Whale watchings are popular among the region to observe mainly humpback whales that come to warm, calm waters around the peninsula during their migration seasons, and some species of dolphins such as pantropical spotted dolphins and spinner dolphins can be found as well.
