= Valdivia culture =

Prehistoric culture of Ecuador

Valdivia
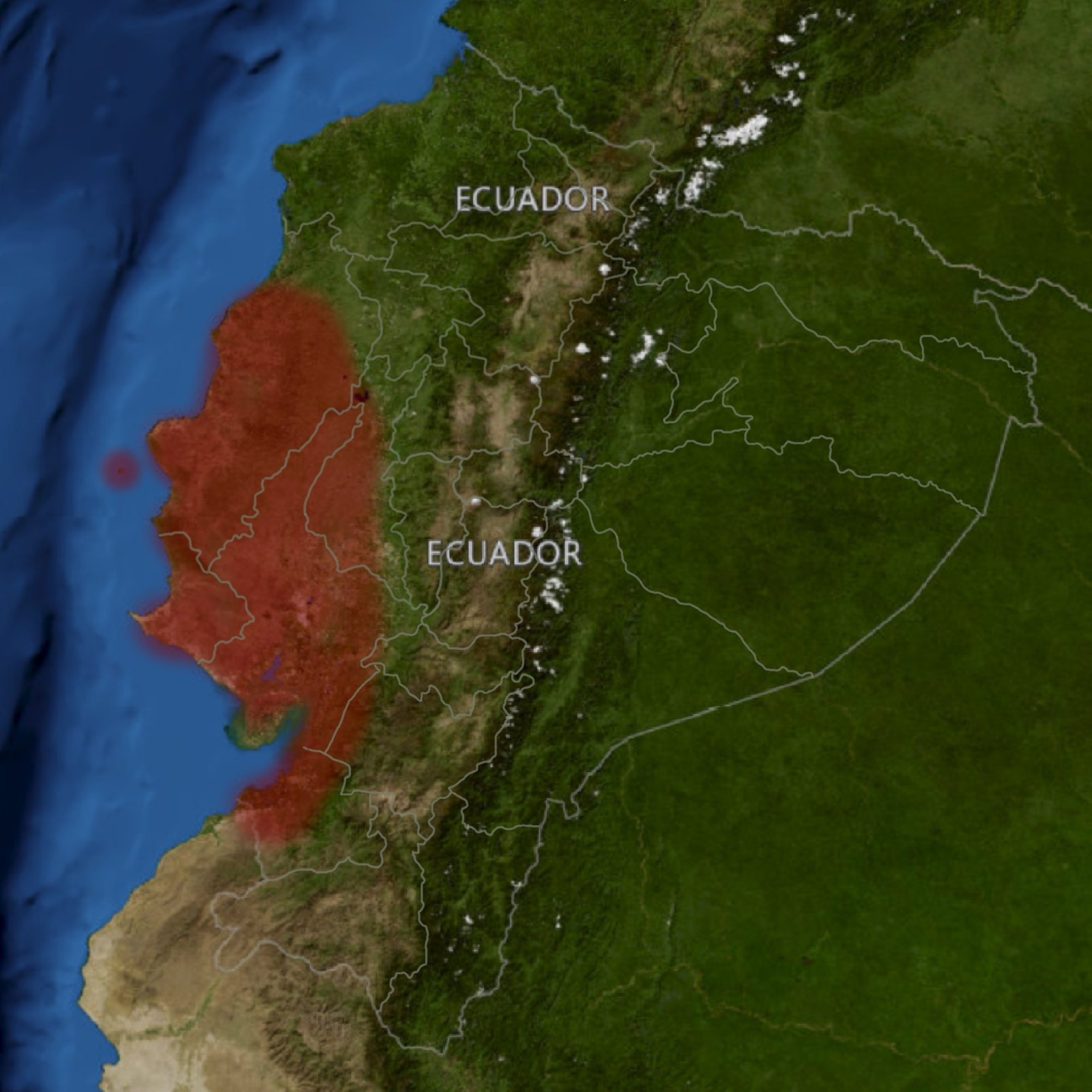
- Map of Valdivia culture
- Geographical range: Santa Elena
- Period: Late Archaic
- Dates: 3800 - 1500 BC
- Preceded by: Las Vegas culture
- Followed by: Machalilla culture, Cotocollao culture

The Valdivia culture is one of the oldest settled cultures recorded in the Americas. It appeared one thousand years after the Las Vegas culture and thrived along the coast of Santa Elena peninsula in Santa Elena Province of Ecuador between 3500 BC and 1500 BC.

== Culture ==
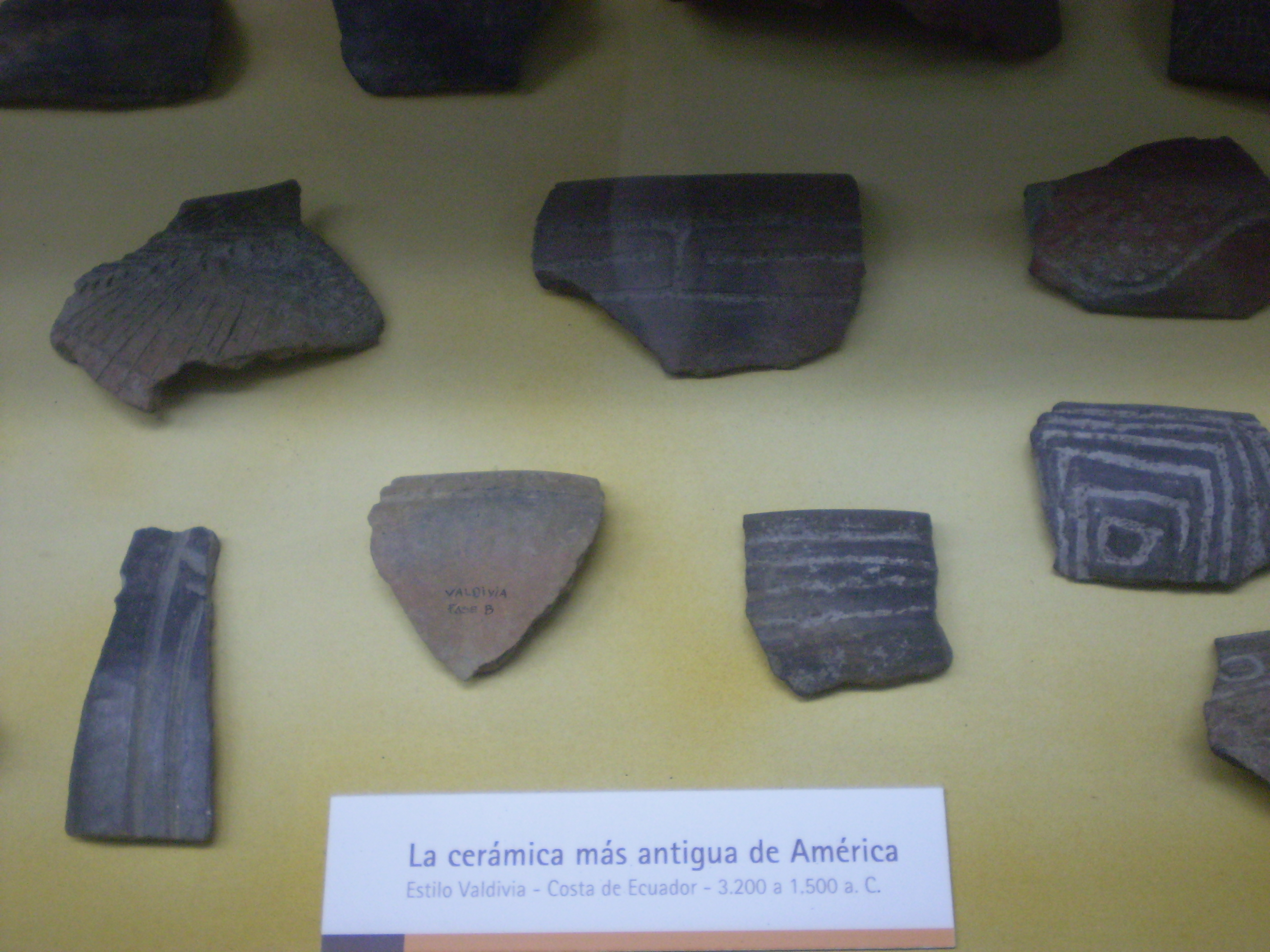
Valdivian pottery is one of the oldest in the Americas, Valdivian pottery display in the Museo de La Plata (Argentina)

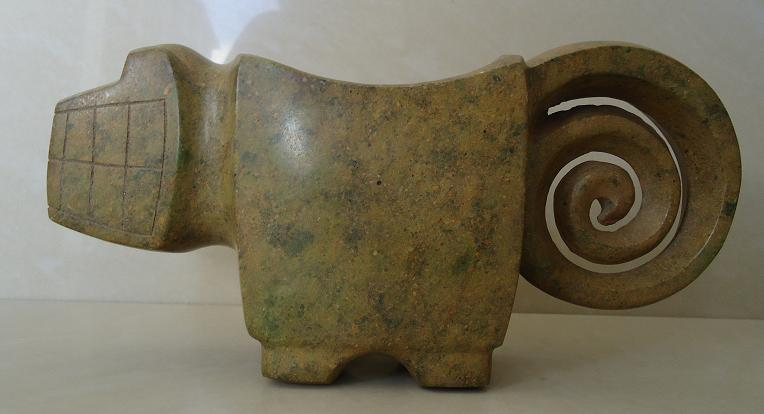
Mortar, Jaguar Valdivia, South Coast (4000 BC to 1500 BC)

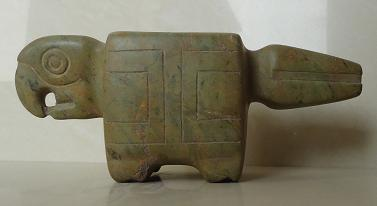
Mortar, Parrot Valdivia, South Coast (4000 BC to 1500 BC)

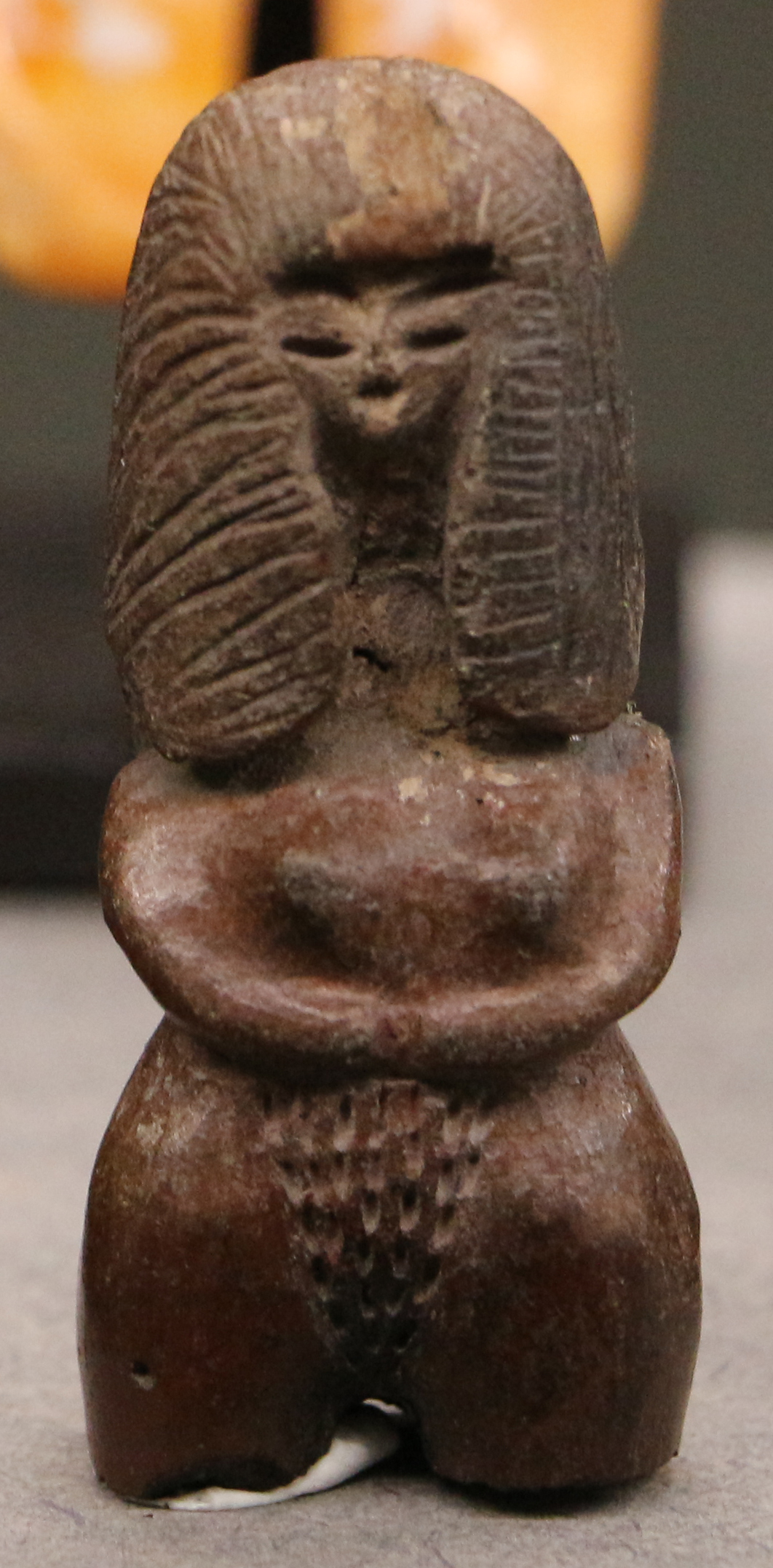
Venus Valdivia (2300-2000 BC), Santa Elena Province, (National Archaeological Museum of Florence)

Remains of the Valdivia culture were discovered in 1956 on the western coast of Ecuador by the Ecuadorian archeologist Emilio Estrada, who continued to study this culture. American archeologists Clifford Evans (1920-1981) and Betty Meggers joined him in the early 1960s in studying the type-site.

The original excavations were in a small village of Valdivia that is located well north of Santa Elena peninsula. The Valdivia site is located about 10km south of the beach resort of Montañita.

The Valdivia lived in a communities that built houses in a circular or oval pattern around a central plaza. They are believed to have been organized in a relatively egalitarian culture of sedentary people who lived mostly from fishing, although they did some farming and occasionally hunted for deer to supplement their diet.

From the archeological remains that have been found, it has been determined that Valdivians cultivated maize, kidney beans, squash, cassava, chili peppers, and cotton plants. The cotton crop was processed, spun, and woven to make clothing.

Initially rough and practical, Valdivian pottery is dated to 2700 BCE, but it became splendid, delicate, and large over time. The pottery generally was made with red and gray pigments and the polished dark red pottery is characteristic of the Valdivia period. In their ceramics and stone works, the Valdivia culture shows a progression from the most simple to much more complicated works.

The trademark example of the pottery created in the culture is the "Venus" of Valdivia: a ceramic figure of a woman. The figures were made by joining two rolls of clay, leaving the lower portion separated as legs, and making the body and head from the top portion. The arms were usually very short and displayed in a compact fashion in most cases, bent toward the chest under the breasts or under the chin. Each figurine is individual and unique, as expressed in the hairstyles. The variable characteristics suggest a possibility that some of the figures found may have represented specific individuals.

A display of Valdivian artifacts is located at Universidad de Especialidades Espíritu Santo in Guayaquil, Ecuador.

A detailed example shown here of a "Valdivian Venus" is displayed in the National Archaeological Museum of Florence.

== Influences on Valdivia culture ==
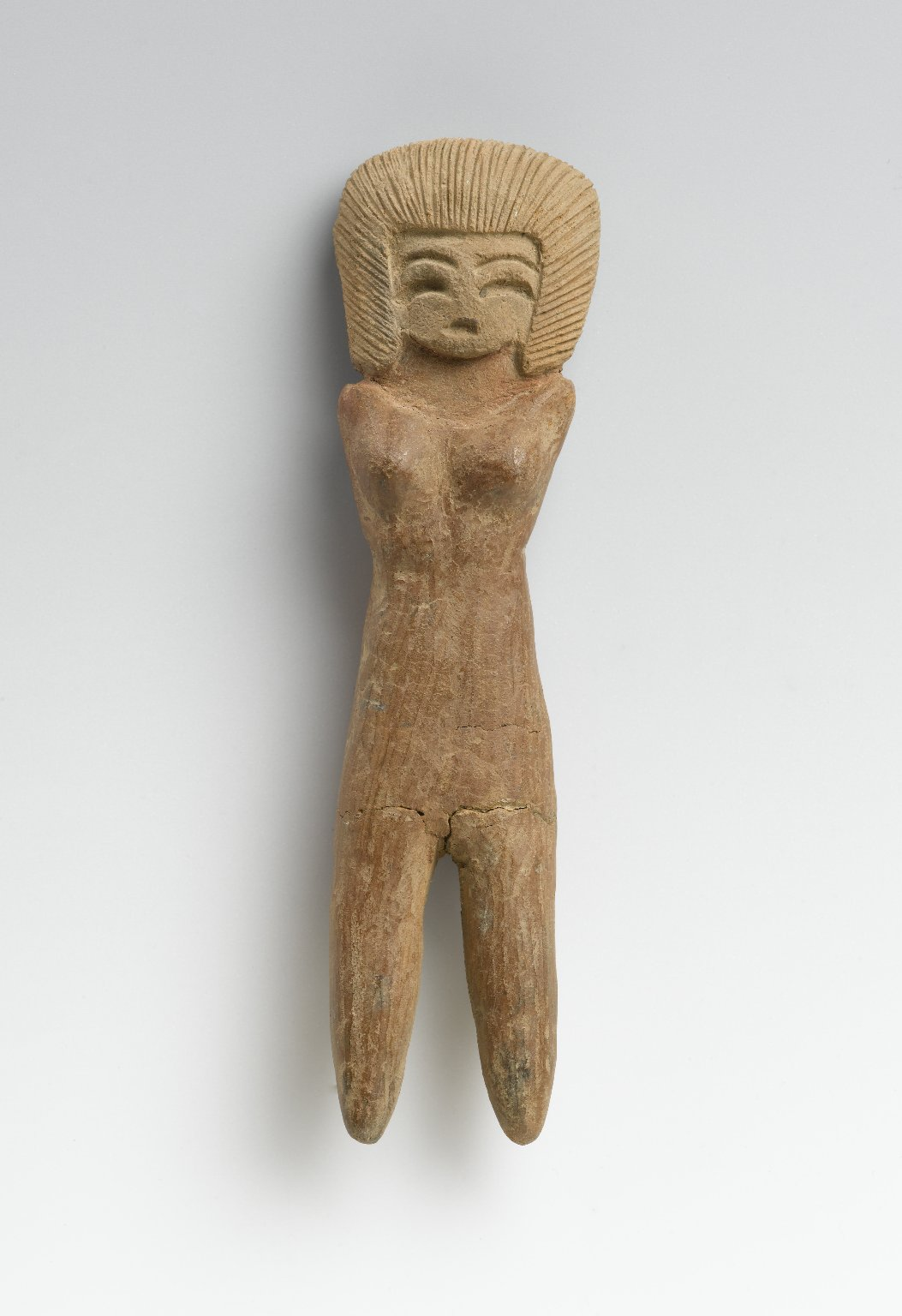
Valdivia figurine; 2600-1500 BC; ceramic; 11 x 2.9 x 1.6 cm (4 5/16 x 1 1/8 x 5/8 in.); Brooklyn Museum (New York City)

ceramic "Phase A" of the Valdivia was long thought to be the oldest pottery produced by a coastal culture in South America, dated to 3000-2700 BC. In the 1960s, a team of researchers proposed there were significant similarities between the archeological remains and pottery styles of Valdivia and those of the ancient Jōmon culture, a culture active in this same period on the island of Kyūshū, Japan. The researchers compared both decoration and vessel shape, pointing to techniques of incising. The Early to Middle Jōmon pottery in Japan had antecedents dating 10,000 years, in contrast, the Valdivia pottery style seemed to have developed rather quickly.

In 1962, three archeologists, Emilio Estrada of Ecuador and the American anthropologists Clifford Evans (1920-1981) and Betty Meggers, suggested that Japanese fishermen may have been shipwrecked by a storm off Ecuador, introducing their existing Jōmon ceramic tradition to Valdivia as they settled the site where they were marooned. Their theory was based on the anthropological concept of diffusion of style and techniques.

Their transplant concept was challenged at the time by other archaeologists, who argued that there were strong logistical challenges to the idea that Japanese could have survived what would have been nearly a year and a half voyage in dugout canoes. The Kuroshio Current does brush up against Japan and would have moved any stray boats northward (toward Alaska and North America) and not toward South America (at least not without encountering North America first). This is due to the Coriolis Effect of the Earth's rotation, and would have been the same direction thousands of years ago. In addition, their argument suggested that since the cultures were separated by a distance of 15,000 km (8,000 nautical miles), scurvy would almost certainly have killed off the people on board if traveling non-stop or without dietary vitamin C. Those researchers used this information to argue that Valdivia ceramics (and culture) had developed independently, and the apparent similarities in the two pottery cultures were a result simply of constraints on technique, and an "accidental convergence" of symbols and style. The Equatorial Counter Current that runs opposite of the Coriolis Effects and leads directly to the coast of Ecuador was not taken into account for the argument, and debate continued.

In the 1970s, what is believed widely to be conclusive evidence refuting an interpretation using the diffusion theory was found at the Valdivia type-site, as older pottery and artifacts demonstrating progressive development were found below the initial excavations. Researchers found what is called "San Pedro" pottery that was more primitive, pre-dating "Phase A" and the Valdivia style.

Some researchers speculate that pottery may have been introduced into the Valdivia culture by people from northern Colombia, where comparably early pottery was found at the Puerto Hormiga archaeological site. In addition, they think that the maize at Valdivia was likely introduced by people living closer to Meosamerica, where it was domesticated. Other pottery remains of the San Pedro style were found at sites about 5.6 miles (9 km) up the river valley.

Additional research at both several coastal sites, including San Pablo, Real Alto, and Salango, as well as Loma Alta, Colimes and San Lorenzo del Mate inland have resulted in a major rethinking of Valdivian culture. It has been reclassified as representing a "tropical forest culture" with a riverine settlement focus. There has been major re-evaluation of nearly every aspect of the Valdivian culture.

Furthermore, further research suggests that Valdivian culture was also engaged with maritime trade with populations in present-day Mexico.

== See also ==
- Chan-Chan
