= Santa Elena, Ecuador =

Santa Elena
- Town
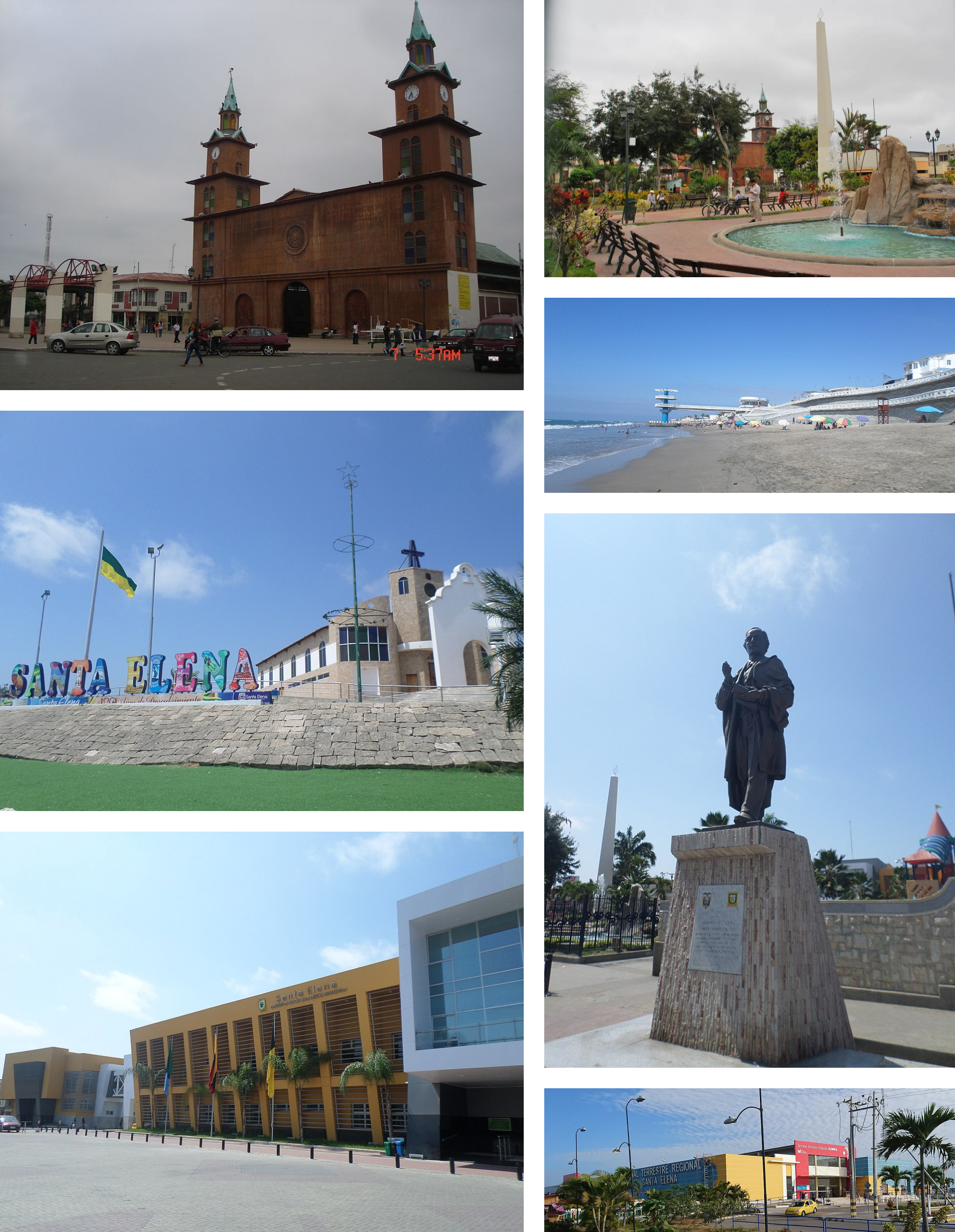
- From top, left to right: Saint Helena Empress Cathedral, Vicente Rocafuerte Central Park, Ballenita beach, El Tablazo viewpoint, monument to Vicente Rocafuerte, City hall of Saint Helena and Sumpa Regional Bus station.

- Location within Ecuador
- Coordinates: 02°13′36″S 80°51′30″W
- Country: Ecuador
- Province: Santa Elena
- Canton: Santa Elena
- Founded: 1531

Area
  - Town: 19.48 km^{2} (7.52 sq mi)
- Elevation: 26 m (85 ft)

Population (2022 census)
  - Town: 54,565
  - Density: 2,801/km^{2} (7,255/sq mi)
- Time zone: UTC-5 hours
- Climate: BWh
- Website: www.gadse.gob.ec/gadse/

Santa Elena (Spanish pronunciation: [ˌsanta eˈlena]) is a town in southwestern Ecuador, and is the capital of both the province and the canton of the same name. Santa Elena, originally called Sumpa, is located on the Ecuadorian peninsula near the city of Guayaquil. It is regarded as the location of the most important and best documented archaeological site in the country, predominantly due to the discovery of the Lovers of Sumpa.

== History ==
=== Archaeology ===
In 1977 Olaf Holm, the Director of the Anthropology Museum of the Central Bank of Ecuador, asked Karen E. Stothert to excavate this pre-ceramic site. Stothert and her team found evidence of Las Vegas, the first Ecuadorian culture. Las Vegas flourished from 8800 to 4600 BC along the Ecuadorian coast. Archaeologists found numerous artifacts and remains of homes and a garbage dump, but the biggest discovery was a cemetery of about 200 people. Among these remains were the bodies of the Lovers of Sumpa, or Los Amantes de Sumpa. They were found buried, and apparently embracing each other. There is much speculation as to why they died, including being stoned to death, but for most of the world it doesn't matter how they died so much as that they died and were buried together.

The discovery of the cemetery, and the Lovers of Sumpa particularly, brought a significant amount of media attention to Ecuador, which in turn helped emphasize the importance of archaeological research to the understanding of heritage and culture. The Lovers of Sumpa have even been called the Romeo and Juliet of Ecuador, and for this reason have served as a great source of information for sculptors, poets, and musicians all over the world. In general this kind of attention has been beneficial for Ecuador, drawing tourists and doubling the Santa Elena population in 20 years. During these same 20 years there was some controversy and drama about what would happen to the site and the remains. Increased oil prices prevented the country from supplying enough funds to the project to do anything beneficial other than provide guards to protect the important cultural site. Despite the lack of funds for so long, eventually the team was able to secure the site in a way that is safe for the artifacts as well as being beneficial to the cultural knowledge of the people. Modernization of Ecuador has drawn the rural people away from their lands and their traditions, but this discovery, which prompted an amazing museum as well as cultural and heritage additions to the curriculum of Santa Elena students, ensures the survival of the rich culture of this once thriving people. The Las Vegas people's customs are being preserved.

== Tourism ==
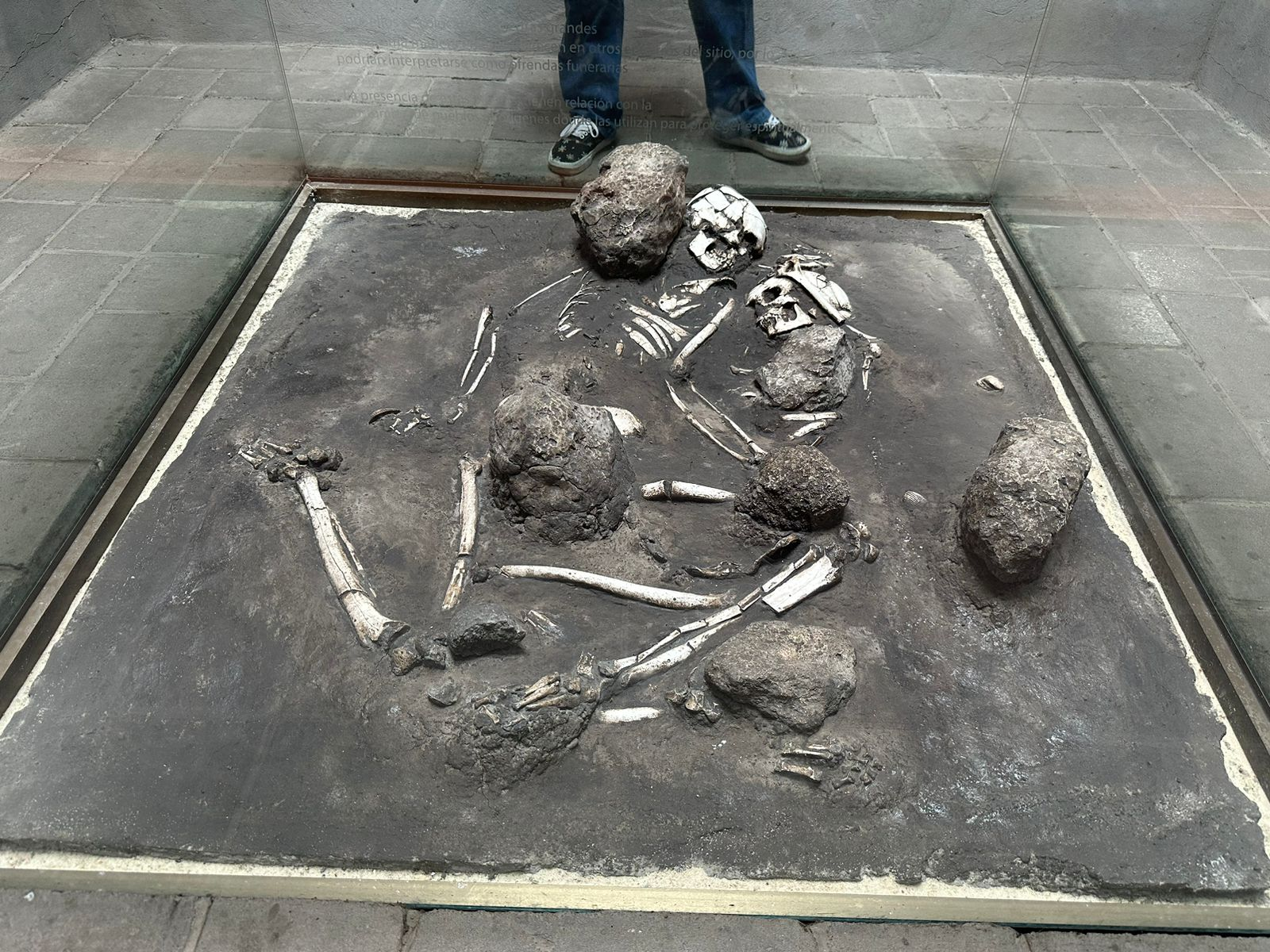
The Lovers of Sumpa (pictured in 2024)

The Santa Elena archaeological site is considered a main attraction of the Ecuadorian coast. Because Ecuador has no moral issues preventing the public display of remains, there are three burials on display, protected by glass, and teachers and archaeologists, such as Stothert, use them in teaching as discussion and learning tools. In 1997 when the country was able to provide the proper funds, the Museo Amantes de Sumpa y Centro Cultural was opened to the public. The opening of this museum showed great cooperation between private and public institutions and is home to a variety of Las Vegas artifacts and remains. The site itself is a center for heritage resources and education, which promote the culture of Native coastal Ecuadorians.
