= List of airports by ICAO code: SD-SH =

List of airports by ICAO code: A - B - C - D - EB-EG - EH-EY - FA-FM - FN-FZ - G - H - ~~I~~ - J - KA-KH - KI-KP - KR-KZ - LA-LJ - LK-LZ - M - N - O - P - Q - R - SA-SC - SD-SH - SI - SJ - SK-SM - SN-SP - SQ - SS-SU - SV-SY - T - U - V - W - ~~X~~ - Y - Z

== SD - Brazil ==
Also see airport category and list.

ICAO	IATA	Airport name	Community	Coordinates	Notes
SDAA		Araras Airport	Araras, São Paulo	22°20′13″S 047°21′30″W	
SDAB		Lazzuli Heliport	Olinda, Pernambuco	08°02′02″S 034°52′16″W	
SDAC		Aché Heliport	Guarulhos, São Paulo	23°28′29″S 046°31′20″W	
SDAD		Everaldo Moraes Barreto Airport	Adamantina, São Paulo	21°41′46″S 051°05′47″W	
SDAE		São Pedro Airport	São Pedro, São Paulo	22°35′01″S 047°53′46″W	
SDAF		Palmeiras Farm Aerodrome	Analândia, São Paulo	22°09′24″S 047°43′09″W	
SDAG	GDR	Angra dos Reis Airport	Angra dos Reis, Rio de Janeiro	22°58′31″S 044°18′26″W	
SDAH		Amil Resgate Heliport	Barueri, São Paulo	23°29′37″S 046°50′54″W	
SDAI		Americana Municipal Airport	Americana, São Paulo	22°45′19″S 047°16′05″W	
SDAJ		Santa Marina Farm Aerodrome	Santo Antônio do Aracanguá, São Paulo	20°50′50″S 050°47′17″W	
SDAK		Solar das Paineiras Heliport	Mogi Guaçu, São Paulo	22°17′47″S 046°51′20″W	
SDAL		Condomínio Guaporé II Heliport	Ribeirão Preto, São Paulo	21°13′36″S 047°46′56″W	
SDAM	CPQ	Campo dos Amarais Airport	Campinas, São Paulo	22°51′33″S 047°06′29″W	
SDAN		Santo Ângelo Farm Aerodrome	Brotas, São Paulo	22°14′44″S 048°15′28″W	
SDAO		Portela Farm Aerodrome	Diamantino, Mato Grosso	14°01′21″S 056°32′19″W	Closed
SDAP		Paulistano Hospital Heliport	São Paulo, São Paulo	23°33′55″S 046°38′32″W	
SDAQ		Farm of Life Heliport	Cabaceiras do Paraguaçu, Bahia	12°30′44″S 039°06′00″W	
SDAR		Agrovera Farm Aerodrome	Porto dos Gaúchos, Mato Grosso	11°53′44″S 056°16′27″W	
SDAS		Santo Antônio Farm Aerodrome	Mirandópolis, São Paulo	21°16′31″S 051°17′00″W	
SDAT		Vitória Hospital & Maternity Heliport	São Paulo, São Paulo	23°33′47″S 046°33′42″W	
SDAU		Itau Farm Aerodrome	Água Clara, Mato Grosso do Sul	19°28′07″S 052°37′17″W	
SDAV		Quick Alameda das Águas Heliport	Nova Lima, Minas Gerais	20°10′21″S 043°55′13″W	
SDAW		Banco Industrial Heliport	São Paulo, São Paulo	23°35′31″S 046°41′08″W	
SDAX		Bradesco–Santa Cecília Heliport	São Paulo, São Paulo	23°32′22″S 046°38′58″W	
SDAY		Santa Lucia Farm Aerodrome	Santa Maria das Barreiras, Pará	08°55′19″S 050°20′54″W	
SDAZ		Rio Alpha Heliport	Rio de Janeiro, Rio de Janeiro	22°54′33″S 043°10′53″W	
SDBA		Batatais Airport	Batatais, São Paulo	20°52′38″S 047°35′08″W	
SDBB		Bebedouro Airport	Bebedouro, São Paulo	20°54′01″S 048°28′25″W	
SDBC		Bradesco Alphaville Heliport	Barueri, São Paulo	23°29′15″S 046°51′27″W	
SDBD		Sodema Farm Aerodrome	Vera, Mato Grosso	12°17′43″S 055°32′13″W	Closed
SDBE		Biopalma Aerodrome	Moju, Pará	02°12′28″S 048°48′50″W	
SDBF		Porto Seguro Heliport	São Paulo, São Paulo	23°31′49″S 046°38′43″W	
SDBG		Barra Green Heliport	Rio de Janeiro, Rio de Janeiro	23°00′24″S 043°20′50″W	
SDBH		Bandeirantes Heliport	São Paulo, São Paulo	23°35′43″S 046°42′39″W	
SDBI		Piray Farm Aerodrome	Sete Quedas, Mato Grosso do Sul	23°53′07″S 055°03′21″W	
SDBJ		Boa Vista Aerodrome	Patrocínio, Minas Gerais	18°45′26″S 046°58′12″W	
SDBK	QCP	Botucatu Airport	Botucatu, São Paulo	22°56′16″S 048°28′05″W	
SDBL		BFC Heliport	São Paulo, São Paulo	23°33′44″S 046°39′15″W	Closed
SDBM		Beneficência Portuguesa Heliport	São Paulo, São Paulo	23°34′04″S 046°38′29″W	
SDBN		Bonanza Farm Aerodrome	Salto de Pirapora, São Paulo	23°41′14″S 047°33′27″W	
SDBO		Morada Nova Heliport	Inhaúma, Minas Gerais	19°27′59″S 044°22′23″W	
SDBP		Pontal Farm Aerodrome	Santa Fé de Goiás, Goiás	15°44′17″S 051°06′58″W	
SDBQ		São Mateus Hospital Heliport	Fortaleza, Ceará	03°44′30″S 038°28′46″W	
SDBR		REC Berrini Heliport	São Paulo, São Paulo	23°36′31″S 046°41′40″W	
SDBS		Os Bandeirantes Heliport	São Paulo, São Paulo	23°34′34″S 046°41′14″W	Closed
SDBT		Haras São Pedro do Alto Heliport	Porto Feliz, São Paulo	23°16′22″S 047°33′22″W	
SDBU		Décio Ituiutaba Heliport	Ituiutaba, Minas Gerais	18°57′52″S 049°30′08″W	
SDBV		Balneário São Januário Aerodrome	Ilha Comprida, São Paulo	24°52′15″S 047°45′30″W	
SDBW		Banespa República Heliport	São Paulo, São Paulo	23°32′37″S 046°38′40″W	Closed
SDBX		Eloy Biesuz Aerodrome	Itapejara d'Oeste, Paraná	25°59′54″S 052°55′36″W	
SDBY		Bariri Airport	Bariri, São Paulo	22°04′09″S 048°42′23″W	
SDBZ		Brauna Farm Aerodrome	Arraias, Tocantins	12°32′58″S 046°53′12″W	
SDCA		Capão Bonito Airport	Capão Bonito, São Paulo	24°02′01″S 048°21′25″W	
SDCB		Centro Brasileiro de Aviação Agrícola Experimental e Recreativo Aerodrome	Brasilia, Federal District	15°46′24″S 047°42′10″W	
SDCC		ThomasiCamargo Heliport	Santa Rita do Passa Quatro, São Paulo	21°42′57″S 047°28′54″W	
SDCD		João Caparroz Airport	Catanduva, São Paulo	21°08′55″S 048°59′17″W	
SDCE		Boa Sorte Farm Aerodrome	Aliança do Tocantins, Tocantins	11°18′06″S 048°40′44″W	
SDCF		Porto Ciriaco Farm Aerodrome	Aquidauana, Mato Grosso do Sul	19°41′48″S 056°17′02″W	
SDCG	OLC	Senadora Eunice Michiles Airport	São Paulo de Olivença, Amazonas	03°28′09″S 068°55′16″W	
SDCH		Rosa dos Ventos Farm Aerodrome	Itumbiara, Goiás	18°18′06″S 049°50′47″W	
SDCI		Quick Cachoeira Farm Heliport	Esmeraldas, Minas Gerais	19°49′09″S 044°20′39″W	
SDCJ		São Domingos Farm Aerodrome	Alto Araguaia, Mato Grosso	17°41′13″S 053°35′28″W	
SDCK		Gleba da Barra Farm Aerodrome	Brasilândia de Minas, Minas Gerais	17°00′59″S 046°04′37″W	
SDCL		Campo Alegre Farm Aerodrome	Cerqueira César, São Paulo	23°09′15″S 049°12′32″W	
SDCM		Sete Povos Aerodrome	São Desidério, Bahia	12°51′48″S 046°09′45″W	
SDCN		Marcílio Dias Naval Medical Centre Heliport	Rio de Janeiro, Rio de Janeiro	22°54′48″S 043°17′00″W	
SDCO	SOD	Sorocaba Airport	Sorocaba, São Paulo	23°28′40″S 047°29′24″W	
SDCP		Hotel Sant'Anna Heliport	Amparo, São Paulo	22°44′13″S 046°44′49″W	
SDCQ		Mediterrâneo Heliport	Cotia, São Paulo	23°35′35″S 046°51′11″W	
SDCR		Caiçara Farm Aerodrome	Itanhaém, São Paulo	24°04′14″S 046°49′44″W	
SDCS		Veracel Heliport	Belmonte, Bahia	16°05′31″S 039°24′46″W	
SDCT		Pequena Tiradentes Heliport	Tiradentes, Minas Gerais	21°07′41″S 044°10′11″W	
SDCU		Brigadeiro Francisco Pinto de Moura Aerodrome	Casimiro de Abreu, Rio de Janeiro	22°33′26″S 042°06′55″W	
SDCV		Citibank Heliport	São Paulo, São Paulo	23°33′54″S 046°39′13″W	
SDCW		Paloma Farm Aerodrome	Colômbia, São Paulo	20°19′17″S 048°50′01″W	
SDCX		Celeiro 2 Aerodrome	Gilbués, Piauí	09°23′55″S 045°08′07″W	
SDCY		São Paulo Corporate Towers Heliport	São Paulo, São Paulo	23°35′30″S 046°41′16″W	
SDCZ		Bom Jardim Farm Aerodrome	Mangaratiba, Rio de Janeiro	22°56′05″S 044°05′30″W	
SDDA		Santa Alaydes Farm Aerodrome	Corumbá, Mato Grosso do Sul	18°27′35″S 055°32′00″W	
SDDB		Ninho do Bacurau Aerodrome	Bom Jesus da Lapa, Bahia	13°14′56″S 043°29′48″W	
SDDC		São João do Guaporé Farm Aerodrome	Pontes e Lacerda, Mato Grosso	15°58′15″S 059°53′28″W	
SDDD		São Francisco Farm Aerodrome	Corumbá, Mato Grosso do Sul	17°51′39″S 055°47′04″W	
SDDE		Dois Irmãos Farm Aerodrome	Manicoré, Amazonas	08°00′35″S 061°46′34″W	
SDDF		Difusora Heliport	São Luís, Maranhão	02°31′29″S 044°17′27″W	
SDDG		São Paulo Samaritan Hospital Heliport	São Paulo, São Paulo	23°32′19″S 046°39′45″W	
SDDH		Birmann 29 Heliport	São Paulo, São Paulo	23°35′19″S 046°40′52″W	
SDDI		Tamara Farm Aerodrome	Salmourão, São Paulo	21°35′29″S 050°49′57″W	
SDDJ		Santa Maria Farm Aerodrome	Monções, São Paulo	20°50′59″S 050°04′59″W	
SDDK		Saint-Exupéry Aerodrome	Ocauçu, São Paulo	22°28′53″S 049°59′09″W	
SDDL		Limeira Farm Aerodrome	São João da Paraúna, Goiás	16°51′57″S 050°24′39″W	
SDDM		Dona Marta Heliport	Río de Janeiro, Rio de Janeiro	22°56′48″S 043°11′53″W	
SDDN		Paulino Ribeiro de Andrade State Airport	Andradina, São Paulo	20°55′30″S 051°22′55″W	
SDDO		Cândido Mendes Heliport	Rio de Janeiro, Rio de Janeiro	22°54′15″S 043°10′31″W	
SDDP		Delta Plaza Heliport	São Paulo, São Paulo	23°34′03″S 046°38′45″W	Closed
SDDQ		São Francisco Farm Aerodrome	Riachão das Neves, Bahia	11°41′41″S 045°30′34″W	
SDDR		Dracena Airport	Dracena, São Paulo	21°27′38″S 051°36′25″W	
SDDS		Sucupira Heliport	São Paulo, São Paulo	23°37′27″S 046°42′12″W	
SDDT		Imbetiba Heliport	Macaé, Rio de Janeiro	22°23′20″S 041°46′14″W	
SDDU		Duets Heliport	Fortaleza, Ceará	03°44′29″S 038°29′15″W	
SDDV		Usina Catanduva Aerodrome	Palmares Paulista, São Paulo	21°07′37″S 048°50′41″W	
SDDW		Marina Verolme Heliport	Angra dos Reis, Rio de Janeiro	22°59′55″S 044°14′56″W	
SDDX		Paiquerê Farm Aerodrome	Populina, São Paulo	19°53′03″S 050°30′16″W	
SDDY		Cesari Heliport	Cubatão, São Paulo	23°49′25″S 046°22′04″W	
SDDZ		Vila São Paulo/Mercosul Heliport	Alvorada do Sul, Paraná	22°41′48″S 051°19′57″W	
SDEA		HSBC Tower Heliport	São Paulo, São Paulo	23°34′59″S 046°41′02″W	
SDEB		São Paulo dos Palmares Farm Aerodrome	Timburi, São Paulo	23°16′10″S 049°32′51″W	
SDEC		Empresarial Charles Darwin Heliport	Recife, Pernambuco	08°03′56″S 034°53′48″W	
SDED		Scoda Aeronáutica Aerodrome	Ipeúna, São Paulo	22°26′25″S 047°42′03″W	
SDEE		Iguatemi Esplanada Heliport	Sorocaba, São Paulo	23°32′10″S 047°27′52″W	
SDEF		Eco Fly Heliport	Ferraz de Vasconcelos, São Paulo	23°31′56″S 046°23′10″W	
SDEG		Evolution Corporate Heliport	Barueri, São Paulo	23°30′16″S 046°51′04″W	
SDEH		Zona Norte Hospital Heliport	Manaus, Amazonas	02°59′53″S 060°01′48″W	
SDEI		Canopus Corporate Alphaville Heliport	Barueri, São Paulo	23°30′14″S 046°50′41″W	
SDEJ		Guará do Pinhal Farm	Itapetininga, São Paulo	23°39′57″S 048°04′22″W	
SDEK		Barra do Una Heliport	São Sebastião, São Paulo	23°44′09″S 045°44′49″W	
SDEL		Spazio JK Condominium Heliport	São Paulo, São Paulo	23°35′28″S 046°41′08″W	
SDEM		Estância Machado Aerodrome	Álvares Machado, São Paulo	22°06′19″S 051°27′16″W	
SDEN		Costa Esmeralda Aerodrome	Porto Belo, Santa Catarina	27°10′00″S 048°37′18″W	
SDEO		Entre Rios Farm Aerodrome	Ibitinga, São Paulo	21°52′43″S 048°39′34″W	
SDEP		Presidente Epitácio Airport	Presidente Epitácio, São Paulo	21°46′30″S 052°08′37″W	
SDEQ		Quatro Barras Heliport	Quatro Barras, Paraná	25°22′36″S 049°05′05″W	
SDER		Entre Rios Farm Aerodrome	Sud Mennucci, São Paulo	20°45′56″S 050°51′18″W	
SDES		Estância Colorado Aerodrome	Sales Oliveira, São Paulo	20°45′43″S 047°51′43″W	
SDET		Tietê Aerodrome	Tietê, São Paulo	23°06′17″S 047°43′28″W	
SDEU		Empresarial Anhanguera Heliport	Cajamar, São Paulo	23°23′05″S 046°49′54″W	
SDEV		Ventania Farm Aerodrome	Campos de Júlio, Mato Grosso	13°08′46″S 059°05′46″W	
SDEW		Júlio Simões-Garagem Heliport	Mogi das Cruzes, São Paulo	23°32′29″S 046°13′45″W	
SDEX		Parque Maeda Heliport	Itu, São Paulo	23°20′21″S 047°20′51″W	
SDEY		Imigrantes Heliport	Diadema, São Paulo	23°41′20″S 046°36′19″W	
SDEZ		Unibanco Eusébio Matoso Heliport	São Paulo, São Paulo	23°34′21″S 046°41′56″W	
SDFA		Frade 1 Heliport	Angra dos Reis, Rio de Janeiro	22°58′09″S 044°26′38″W	
SDFB		Fundação Bradesco Heliport	Campinas, São Paulo	22°57′52″S 047°04′38″W	
SDFC		Constância Farm Aerodrome	Altair, São Paulo	20°29′20″S 049°11′20″W	
SDFD		Coronel Aviador Carlos Orleans Guimarães Airport	Fernandópolis, São Paulo	20°16′36″S 050°12′50″W	
SDFE		Pertinho do Céu Farm Aerodrome	Guiratinga, Mato Grosso	16°28′23″S 053°54′45″W	
SDFF		Fusão Farm Aerodrome	Lábrea, Amazonas	09°34′06″S 067°18′18″W	
SDFG		CADF Heliport	Brasilia, Federal District	15°50′10″S 048°05′02″W	
SDFH		Amália Farm Aerodrome	Santa Rosa de Viterbo, São Paulo	21°26′39″S 047°22′16″W	
SDFI		Rio Crixás Farm Aerodrome	Mundo Novo, Goiás	13°44′17″S 050°00′52″W	
SDFJ		Murungaba Farm Aerodrome	Tietê, São Paulo	22°57′05″S 047°45′36″W	
SDFK		Figueira Farm Aerodrome	Marabá Paulista, São Paulo	22°04′04″S 052°09′01″W	
SDFL		Lagoa Corporate Heliport	São Luís, Maranhão	02°30′00″S 044°18′28″W	
SDFM		DJY Heliport	São Paulo, São Paulo	23°35′51″S 046°41′08″W	
SDFN		Praia da Fazenda Heliport	Angra dos Reis, Rio de Janeiro	23°02′51″S 044°21′04″W	
SDFO		Centro Gráfico–Folha Heliport	Santana de Parnaíba, São Paulo	23°27′59″S 046°51′38″W	
SDFP		Folha de São Paulo Heliport	São Paulo, São Paulo	23°32′16″S 046°38′45″W	Closed
SDFQ		Centro Empresarial Botafogo Heliport	Rio de Janeiro, Rio de Janeiro	22°56′40″S 043°10′57″W	
SDFR		Riomar Fortaleza Heliport	Fortaleza, Ceará	03°44′28″S 038°28′25″W	
SDFS		Santa Gertrudes Farm Heliport	Dourado, São Paulo	22°05′32″S 048°20′51″W	
SDFT		Virgolino de Oliveira Aerodrome	Itapira, São Paulo	22°24′55″S 046°48′32″W	
SDFU		Ponte Funda Farm Aerodrome	Presidente Epitácio, São Paulo	21°52′14″S 052°09′47″W	
SDFV		Federação Paulista de Futebol Heliport	São Paulo, São Paulo	23°31′20″S 046°40′02″W	
SDFW		San Paolo Condominium Heliport	São Paulo, São Paulo	23°34′30″S 046°41′16″W	
SDFX		Casa Nova Aerodrome	Casa Nova, Bahia	09°09′27″S 040°56′15″W	
SDFY		Valença Farm Aerodrome	Rio Negro, Mato Grosso do Sul	19°24′38″S 055°10′24″W	
SDFZ		Santana Farm Aerodrome	Riachão das Neves, Bahia	11°39′49″S 045°44′02″W	
SDGA		Adecoagro Aerodrome	Angélica, Mato Grosso do Sul	22°02′17″S 053°50′47″W	
SDGB		Usina Colorado Aerodrome	Guaíra, São Paulo	20°16′37″S 048°10′55″W	
SDGC		Garça Aerodrome	Garça, São Paulo	22°11′01″S 049°39′22″W	
SDGD		Eucatex-Botucatú Heliport	Botucatu, São Paulo	22°59′39″S 048°34′04″W	
SDGE		Casas Bahia Heliport	São Caetano do Sul, São Paulo	23°36′40″S 046°34′15″W	
SDGF		Usina Santa Luzia Aerodrome	Nova Alvorada do Sul, Mato Grosso do Sul	21°33′09″S 054°14′01″W	
SDGG		Aché Faria Lima Heliport	São Paulo, São Paulo	23°33′39″S 046°41′39″W	
SDGH		Parque do Peão Mussa Calil Neto Heliport	Barretos, São Paulo	20°30′40″S 048°35′34″W	
SDGI		Guariroba S/A Farm Heliport	Campinas, São Paulo	22°55′22″S 046°54′25″W	
SDGJ		São José Farm Aerodrome	Porto Murtinho, Mato Grosso do Sul	21°19′51″S 056°54′39″W	
SDGK		Grupo Petrópolis Heliport	Petrópolis, Rio de Janeiro	22°21′08″S 043°09′51″W	
SDGL		Catedral Mundial da Fé Heliport	Rio de Janeiro, Rio de Janeiro	22°52′51″S 043°16′29″W	
SDGM		Mucambo Farm	Baldim, Minas Gerais	19°17′36″S 043°53′29″W	
SDGN		Empresarial Pontes Corporate Centre Heliport	Recife, Pernambuco	08°07′54″S 034°54′15″W	
SDGO		Braspress Heliport	Guarulhos, São Paulo	23°27′15″S 046°29′08″W	
SDGP		Gaivota Farm Aerodrome	Paranatinga, Mato Grosso	14°00′45″S 053°28′00″W	
SDGQ		Jeová Gomes Aerodrome	Limoeiro do Norte, Ceará	05°11′37″S 038°08′38″W	
SDGR		Guararapes Municipal Airport	Guararapes, São Paulo	21°15′47″S 050°39′11″W	
SDGS		Bertolucci Heliport	São Paulo, São Paulo	23°35′09″S 046°40′49″W	
SDGT		Agrotec Aerodrome	Manacapuru, Amazonas	03°12′20″S 060°32′29″W	
SDGU		Grotta del Caravaggio Heliport	Santa Teresa, Espírito Santo	19°54′49″S 040°39′26″W	
SDGV		Conde Heliport	Nova Lima, Minas Gerais	19°59′41″S 043°57′08″W	
SDGW		JKFC Heliport	São Paulo, São Paulo	23°35′12″S 046°40′29″W	Closed
SDGX		Morro de São Paulo Aerodrome	Cairu, Bahia	13°25′46″S 038°54′50″W	
SDGY		Anhangaí Farm Aerodrome	Araçatuba, São Paulo	20°55′39″S 050°44′35″W	
SDGZ		Bradesco Cidade de Deus Heliport	Osasco, São Paulo	23°32′58″S 046°46′20″W	
SDHA		HASP Heliport	São Paulo, São Paulo	23°30′48″S 046°38′39″W	
SDHB		Bradesco Heliport	Osasco, São Paulo	23°32′54″S 046°46′08″W	
SDHC		Koga Farm Aerodrome	Getulina, São Paulo	21°52′12″S 049°58′51″W	
SDHD		Niterói Hospital Complex Heliport	Niterói, Rio de Janeiro	22°53′40″S 043°06′57″W	
SDHE		Herdade Farm Aerodrome	Itapira, São Paulo	22°29′33″S 046°50′38″W	
SDHF		Ambroso Heliport	São João da Boa Vista, São Paulo	21°58′00″S 046°45′08″W	
SDHG		Málaga Heliport	Osasco, São Paulo	23°28′54″S 046°46′41″W	
SDHH		Base Resgate Heliport	Brasília, Federal District	15°46′30″S 047°54′22″W	
SDHI		Edmundo Vasconcelos Hospital Heliport	São Paulo, São Paulo	23°35′43″S 046°39′09″W	
SDHJ		Ji-Paraná Tradição Heliport	Ji-Paraná, Rondônia	10°56′01″S 061°55′35″W	
SDHK		Tulipa Farm Aerodrome	Campinorte, Goiás	14°06′38″S 049°02′47″W	
SDHL		Lagoa Heliport	Rio de Janeiro, Rio de Janeiro	22°58′29″S 043°12′59″W	
SDHM		Belo Horizonte Metropolitan Hospital Heliport	Belo Horizonte, Minas Gerais	19°59′08″S 044°00′24″W	
SDHN		Hellix Business Centre Heliport	Itaboraí, Rio de Janeiro	22°44′39″S 042°51′08″W	
SDHO		Bradesco–Santo André Heliport	Santo André, São Paulo	23°39′21″S 046°31′42″W	Closed
SDHP		Modelo II Aerodrome	Ribas do Rio Pardo, Mato Grosso do Sul	21°09′42″S 053°17′00″W	
SDHQ		Shopping Leste Aricanduva Heliport	São Paulo, São Paulo	23°31′02″S 046°30′20″W	
SDHR		União Farm Aerodrome	Porto Murtinho, Mato Grosso do Sul	20°54′17″S 057°13′49″W	
SDHS		Ouro Branco Farm Aerodrome	Porto dos Gaúchos, Mato Grosso	12°01′04″S 056°24′49″W	
SDHT		Cetenco Plaza North Tower Heliport	São Paulo, São Paulo	23°33′32″S 046°39′27″W	
SDHU		Morro da Urca Heliport	Rio de Janeiro, Rio de Janeiro	22°57′05″S 043°09′56″W	
SDHV		Albert Einstein Hospital Heliport	São Paulo, São Paulo	23°36′01″S 046°42′55″W	
SDHW		Bandeirantes Hospital Heliport	São Paulo, São Paulo	23°33′27″S 046°38′05″W	
SDHX		D'Tapes Aerodrome	Tapes, Rio Grande do Sul	30°44′59″S 051°32′06″W	
SDHY		São Luís Gonzaga Heliport	São Paulo, São Paulo	23°33′24″S 046°39′40″W	Closed
SDHZ		Vera Cruz Hospital Heliport	Campinas, São Paulo	22°54′16″S 047°04′04″W	
SDIA		Cidade Heliport	São Paulo, São Paulo	23°32′45″S 046°37′57″W	
SDIB		Irmãos Ribeiro Aerodrome	Espírito Santo do Pinhal, São Paulo	22°09′38″S 046°46′33″W	
SDIC		Capão Seco Farm Aerodrome	Formiga, Minas Gerais	20°42′43″S 045°41′22″W	
SDID		Aeroata Aerodrome	Araçatuba, São Paulo	21°15′11″S 050°32′01″W	
SDIE		Lagoa Farm Aerodrome	Lagoa Grande, Minas Gerais	17°45′52″S 046°32′49″W	
SDIF		Palácio Tiradentes Heliport	Belo Horizonte, Minas Gerais	19°47′12″S 043°57′06″W	
SDIG		Ibitinga Airport	Ibitinga, São Paulo	21°44′50″S 048°51′21″W	
SDIH		Irohy Farm	Biritiba-Mirim, São Paulo	23°33′56″S 046°04′10″W	
SDII		iTower Heliport	Barueri, São Paulo	23°30′17″S 046°50′58″W	
SDIJ		Gravatá Heliport	Gravatá, Pernambuco	08°11′14″S 035°30′00″W	
SDIK		Alpha Business Empresarial Heliport	Campinas, São Paulo	22°49′10″S 047°02′07″W	
SDIL		Pedra Branca Farm Airport	Angra dos Reis, Rio de Janeiro	22°54′08″S 044°17′17″W	
SDIM	TTY	Itanhaém Airport	Itanhaém, São Paulo	24°09′53″S 046°47′08″W	
SDIN		Piúna Farm Aerodrome	Anaurilândia, Mato Grosso do Sul	21°53′14″S 052°55′49″W	
SDIO		Aeroclube de Itápolis Aerodrome	Itápolis, São Paulo	21°35′59″S 048°49′58″W	
SDIP		Vela Ipuã Farm Flight Centre	Caçapava, São Paulo	23°02′36″S 045°46′32″W	
SDIQ		Goettems Heliport	Angra dos Reis, Rio de Janeiro	23°02′53″S 044°11′42″W	Closed
SDIR		Ajarani 2 Aerodrome	Iracema, Roraima	01°53′15″N 062°01′06″W	Closed
SDIS		The Eagles Nest Heliport	Arandu, São Paulo	23°14′51″S 049°01′26″W	
SDIT		Itaú NPD Paulista Heliport	São Paulo, São Paulo	23°34′36″S 046°39′29″W	
SDIU		Unimed Heliport	Campo Grande, Mato Grosso do Sul	20°27′01″S 054°34′34″W	
SDIV		Ituverava Airport	Ituverava, São Paulo	20°22′31″S 047°46′07″W	
SDIW		São Paulo Trade Building Heliport	São Paulo, São Paulo	23°35′39″S 046°41′22″W	
SDIX		Ninheira MGX Florestal Airport	Ninheira, Minas Gerais	15°29′59″S 041°33′57″W	
SDIY	FEC	Gov. João Durval Carneiro Airport	Feira de Santana, Bahia	12°12′02″S 038°54′23″W	Also SBFE; Formerly SNJD
SDIZ		Diamante Farm Aerodrome	Baixa Grande do Ribeiro, Piauí	09°03′32″S 045°30′15″W	
SDJA		Dr. José Augusto de Arruda Botelho Aerodrome	Itirapina, São Paulo	22°11′41″S 047°51′43″W	
SDJB		Quinta da Baroneza II Heliport	Bragança Paulista, São Paulo	22°58′24″S 046°42′02″W	
SDJC		Jaboticabal Aeroclub Aerodrome	Jaboticabal, São Paulo	21°13′51″S 048°17′08″W	
SDJD		Juquehy Baleia Heliport	São Sebastião, São Paulo	23°45′39″S 045°42′45″W	
SDJE		Estádio Olímpico João Havelange Heliport	Rio de Janeiro, Rio de Janeiro	22°53′34″S 043°17′38″W	
SDJF		Jequitibá Farm Aerodrome	Buri, São Paulo	23°50′46″S 048°26′51″W	
SDJG		São João do Pirajá Farm Aerodrome	Currais, Piauí	09°01′07″S 044°35′14″W	
SDJH		Norberto Odebrecht Heliport	Salvador, Bahia	12°57′45″S 038°26′08″W	
SDJI		Avibrás II Heliport	Jacareí, São Paulo	23°19′34″S 045°49′00″W	
SDJJ		Río Pardo Heliport	Iaras, São Paulo	22°52′17″S 049°02′51″W	
SDJK		Centro Empresarial Araguaia Heliport	Barueri, São Paulo	23°30′07″S 046°50′26″W	
SDJL		Jales Aerodrome	Jales, São Paulo	20°17′33″S 050°32′44″W	
SDJM		Sítio Santo Antônio Heliport	Jundiaí, São Paulo	23°07′57″S 046°55′42″W	
SDJN		São Luiz Farm Aerodrome	Jardinópolis, São Paulo	21°05′48″S 047°44′02″W	
SDJO		São Joaquim da Barra Airport	São Joaquim da Barra, São Paulo	20°35′36″S 047°50′32″W	
SDJP		Igreja Mundial do Poder de Deus Heliport	São Paulo, São Paulo	23°33′03″S 046°37′15″W	
SDJQ		São Joaquim O.B. Farm Aerodrome	Pereira Barreto, São Paulo	20°49′42″S 051°00′29″W	
SDJR		JN Resort Aerodrome	Sete Lagoas, Minas Gerais	19°25′49″S 044°18′16″W	
SDJS		Andorinha Aerodrome	Uiramutã, Roraima	04°43′38″N 060°14′30″W	
SDJT		J. Toledo Heliport	Jundiaí, São Paulo	23°10′30″S 046°54′32″W	
SDJU		São Luiz Hospital Heliport	São Paulo, São Paulo	23°35′26″S 046°40′23″W	
SDJV		São João da Boa Vista Municipal Airport	São João da Boa Vista, São Paulo	22°01′04″S 046°50′27″W	
SDJW		Rede d'Or São Luiz Morumbi Heliport	São Paulo, São Paulo	23°35′27″S 046°42′12″W	
SDJX		Serra Dourada Farm Aerodrome	Palmeirópolis, Tocantins	13°06′16″S 048°22′55″W	
SDJY		Paulista Capital Plaza–The Flat Heliport	São Paulo, São Paulo	23°34′18″S 046°38′47″W	
SDJZ		São José Farm Aerodrome	São Gabriel, Rio Grande do Sul	29°56′56″S 054°08′50″W	
SDKA		Angical Aerodrome	Normandia, Roraima	04°09′54″N 059°50′06″W	
SDKB		CJB Curitiba Heliport	Curitiba, Paraná	25°26′17″S 049°14′26″W	
SDKC		São Lucas Farm Aerodrome	Gália, São Paulo	22°18′13″S 049°27′44″W	
SDKD		Condomínio América Business Park Heliport	São Paulo, São Paulo	23°37′07″S 046°42′11″W	
SDKE		Valença do Piauí Aerodrome	Valença do Piauí, Piauí	06°23′15″S 041°45′53″W	
SDKF		Itamotinga Airport	Curaça I, Bahia	09°09′20″S 040°05′29″W	
SDKG		Francisco Mellão Heliport	São Paulo, São Paulo	23°35′37″S 046°41′19″W	
SDKH		Canutama Airport	Canutama, Amazonas	06°31′45″S 064°23′02″W	
SDKI		CL Heliport	São José dos Campos, São Paulo	23°13′30″S 045°54′25″W	Closed
SDKJ		Formosa do Rio Preto Airport	Formosa do Rio Preto, Bahia	11°01′16″S 045°11′14″W	
SDKK		Mococa Aerodrome	Mococa, São Paulo	21°29′14″S 047°02′02″W	
SDKL		Caracaranã Aerodrome	Normandia, Roraima	03°50′12″N 059°46′38″W	
SDKM		Hotel Emiliano Heliport	São Paulo, São Paulo	23°33′58″S 046°39′55″W	
SDKN		Chopper Solution Heliport	Eusébio, Ceará	03°50′42″S 038°26′33″W	
SDKO		Campo Grande Farm Aerodrome	Colômbia, São Paulo	20°15′28″S 048°47′19″W	
SDKP		Pirangi Farm Aerodrome	Nova Andradina, Mato Grosso do Sul	22°16′06″S 053°25′59″W	
SDKQ		São João Farm Aerodrome	Guaraci, São Paulo	20°11′26″S 049°03′04″W	
SDKR		Santo Antônio Farm Heliport	Araras, São Paulo	22°22′46″S 047°19′35″W	
SDKS		Enseadinha Heliport	Ipojuca, Pernambuco	08°33′00″S 035°00′25″W	
SDKT		Dacon Building Heliport	São Paulo, São Paulo	23°34′50″S 046°41′03″W	
SDKU		Itanhangá Heliport	Indaiatuba, São Paulo	23°03′23″S 047°11′07″W	
SDKV		Rede Globo Heliport	São Paulo, São Paulo	23°36′53″S 046°41′49″W	
SDKW		Wessel Heliport	Araçariguama, São Paulo	23°24′58″S 047°06′31″W	
SDKX		Serra Azul Farm Aerodrome	Rosário Oeste, Mato Grosso	14°37′35″S 055°38′59″W	
SDKY		Hospital das Clínicas Heliport	São Paulo, São Paulo	23°33′29″S 046°40′09″W	
SDKZ		Caraparu 4 Aerodrome	Uiramutã, Roraima	04°33′29″N 060°28′12″W	
SDLA		Laranjeiras Condominium Heliport	Paraty, Rio de Janeiro	23°20′36″S 044°39′47″W	
SDLB		Metropolitan Office Heliport	São Paulo, São Paulo	23°34′52″S 046°40′58″W	
SDLC		Lucélia Aerodrome	Lucélia, São Paulo	21°44′58″S 051°01′06″W	
SDLD		Barra Grande Farm Aerodrome	Confresa, Mato Grosso	10°08′18″S 051°59′39″W	
SDLE		Rio de Contas Aerodrome	Rio de Contas, Bahia	13°34′59″S 041°47′27″W	
SDLF		SBT Heliport	Osasco, São Paulo	23°28′36″S 046°46′41″W	
SDLG		Planalto Farm Aerodrome	Costa Rica, Mato Grosso do Sul	18°11′55″S 053°12′48″W	
SDLH		Pato Branco Farm Aerodrome	São Gabriel do Oeste, Mato Grosso do Sul	19°19′19″S 054°31′17″W	
SDLI		Dois Irmãos Farm Aerodrome	Campo Novo do Parecis, Mato Grosso	13°36′09″S 057°52′30″W	
SDLJ		Agéo Paraopeba Farm Heliport	Paraopeba, Minas Gerais	19°15′29″S 044°28′39″W	
SDLK		Caculé Airport	Caculé, Bahia	14°28′52″S 042°15′53″W	
SDLL		Yolanda Penteado Municipal Aerodrome	Leme, São Paulo	22°13′33″S 047°22′51″W	
SDLM		Guariba Aerodrome	Normandia, Roraima	03°51′19″N 059°55′36″W	Closed
SDLN		Primavera Airport	Querência, Mato Grosso	12°36′59″S 052°09′14″W	
SDLO	PBA	Boipeba Airport	Boipeba (Cairu), Bahia	13°33′52″S 038°56′20″W	
SDLP	QGC	Lençóis Paulista Airport	Lençóis Paulista, São Paulo	22°34′42″S 048°46′28″W	
SDLQ		Maresias Heliport	São Sebastião, São Paulo	23°47′11″S 045°34′19″W	
SDLR		Luiz Ribiero Maia Aerodrome	Tapauá, Amazonas	05°38′10″S 063°11′09″W	
SDLS		Hangar 77 Heliport	Guabiruba, Santa Catarina	27°05′01″S 048°57′53″W	
SDLT		Litucera Heliport	Vinhedo, São Paulo	23°02′23″S 046°59′01″W	
SDLU		Santa Luíza Farm Aerodrome	Barra Bonita, São Paulo	22°29′00″S 048°31′28″W	
SDLV		São Francisco Farm Aerodrome	Florestópolis, Paraná	22°55′15″S 051°21′07″W	Closed
SDLW		Colorado Farm Aerodrome	Aruanã, Goiás	14°58′55″S 050°50′58″W	
SDLX		Jacareúna Farm Aerodrome	São Félix do Araguaia, Mato Grosso	11°26′31″S 052°11′58″W	
SDLY		Armando Natali Aerodrome	Matão, São Paulo	21°37′27″S 048°21′03″W	
SDLZ		Campo Verde Aerodrome	Campo Verde, Mato Grosso	15°31′43″S 055°08′29″W	
SDMA		Muraro Aerodrome	Itupeva, São Paulo	23°11′09″S 047°03′38″W	
SDMB		Benteler Heliport	Campinas, São Paulo	23°00′07″S 047°07′01″W	
SDMC		Cajupí Farm Aerodrome	Baixa Grande do Ribeiro, Piauí	08°19′57″S 045°05′02″W	
SDMD		Santa Izabel Farm Aerodrome	Coxim, Mato Grosso do Sul	18°00′50″S 054°42′49″W	
SDME		Marchesan S.A. Aerodrome	Matão, São Paulo	21°37′46″S 048°23′34″W	
SDMF		Damaro Farm Aerodrome	Miranda, Mato Grosso do Sul	19°58′39″S 056°26′19″W	
SDMG		Haxiu Aerodrome	Alto Alegre, Roraima	02°40′33″N 063°44′49″W	
SDMH		Mirassol Aerodrome	Mirassol, São Paulo	20°48′26″S 049°29′10″W	
SDMI		8th District Naval Command Heliport	São Paulo, São Paulo	23°35′37″S 046°38′47″W	
SDMJ		Mogi Mirim Municipal Airport	Mogi Mirim, São Paulo	22°24′39″S 046°54′20″W	
SDMK		Letícia Aerodrome	Ribas do Rio Pardo, Mato Grosso do Sul	21°33′07″S 053°33′27″W	
SDML		Destro Macro Heliport	Curitiba, Paraná	25°33′30″S 049°18′13″W	
SDMM		Lago Verde	Pacaraima, Roraima	04°33′28″N 060°47′10″W	
SDMN		Continental Tower Heliport	São Paulo, São Paulo	23°36′06″S 046°41′57″W	
SDMO		Monte Alto Airport	Monte Alto, São Paulo	21°15′29″S 048°31′27″W	
SDMP		DIMEP Farm Aerodrome	Itatinga, São Paulo	23°08′19″S 048°29′43″W	
SDMQ		Quebracho Brasil Farm Aerodrome	Porto Murtinho, Mato Grosso do Sul	21°50′53″S 057°54′01″W	
SDMS		Marechiaro Heliport	Angra dos Reis, Rio de Janeiro	23°00′56″S 044°16′50″W	
SDMT		Banco Bradesco Avenida Paulista Heliport	São Paulo, São Paulo	23°33′44″S 046°39′18″W	
SDMU		Multiplan Heliport	Rio de Janeiro, Rio de Janeiro	22°54′27″S 043°10′33″W	
SDMV		Morro Vermelho Farm Aerodrome	Jaú, São Paulo	22°16′28″S 048°36′15″W	
SDMW		Karajá Farm Aerodrome	Nova Crixas, Goiás	14°06′44″S 050°40′56″W	
SDMX		Fontana Farm Aerodrome	Campo Verde, Mato Grosso	15°30′10″S 055°22′54″W	
SDMY		Cambuhy Farm Aerodrome	Matão, São Paulo	21°37′58″S 048°28′46″W	
SDMZ		Mercedes-Benz of Brazil Heliport	São Bernardo do Campo, São Paulo	23°39′48″S 046°34′46″W	
SDNA		Vale Verde Farm Aerodrome	Comendador Gomes, Minas Gerais	19°40′19″S 048°59′43″W	
SDNB		Brasnorte Aerodrome	Brasnorte, Mato Grosso	12°05′58″S 058°00′06″W	
SDNC		Cabeceira Farm Aerodrome	Dom Aquino, Mato Grosso	15°25′49″S 054°44′16″W	
SDND		Nova Damasco Farm Aerodrome	Narandiba, São Paulo	22°28′56″S 051°31′47″W	
SDNE		São Joaquim Farm Aerodrome	Marabá Paulista, São Paulo	22°11′55″S 051°58′35″W	
SDNF		Agéo Capitão do Mato Farm Heliport	Nova Lima, Minas Gerais	20°09′38″S 043°55′24″W	
SDNG		São João Farm Heliport	Jaú, São Paulo	22°25′06″S 048°36′02″W	
SDNH		Novo Horizonte Municipal Airport	Novo Horizonte, São Paulo	21°29′52″S 049°14′04″W	
SDNI		Nascimento I Aerodrome	Vargem Grande Paulista, São Paulo	23°37′10″S 046°58′59″W	
SDNJ		Nascimento II Aerodrome	Capão Bonito, São Paulo	24°04′20″S 048°13′18″W	
SDNK		Vitória Farm Aerodrome	Primavera do Leste, Mato Grosso	14°57′54″S 054°03′30″W	
SDNL		Santa Claudina Farm Aerodrome	Caarapó, Mato Grosso do Sul	22°31′01″S 054°40′41″W	
SDNM	DNM	Brig. Eduardo Gomes Airport	Nova Mutum, Mato Grosso	13°49′16″S 056°02′19″W	
SDNN		Birmann 21 Heliport	São Paulo, São Paulo	23°33′55″S 046°42′08″W	
SDNO		São Manuel Airport	São Manuel, São Paulo	22°41′46″S 048°34′34″W	
SDNP		Conde Matarazzo Condominium Heliport	São Paulo, São Paulo	23°32′52″S 046°38′16″W	
SDNQ		Água Limpa Farm	Rio Branco, Acre	09°58′50″S 067°29′28″W	
SDNR		Banco Santander Heliport	São Paulo, São Paulo	23°39′08″S 046°42′50″W	
SDNS		Furnas Farm Aerodrome	Chapada dos Guimarães, Mato Grosso	14°59′04″S 055°12′46″W	
SDNT		Terra Prometida Farm Aerodrome	Porto Nacional, Tocantins	10°24′52″S 048°15′24″W	
SDNU		Ministro Nelson Hungria Heliport	Rio de Janeiro, Rio de Janeiro	22°54′22″S 043°10′22″W	
SDNV		Manduri Farm Aerodrome	Corumbá, Mato Grosso do Sul	18°30′28″S 056°25′29″W	
SDNW		Guanabara Farm Aerodrome	Rio Negro, Mato Grosso do Sul	19°31′00″S 055°13′55″W	
SDNX		Helimater Heliport	Angra dos Reis, Rio de Janeiro	23°02′32″S 044°11′32″W	
SDNY		Ponte Serrada Farm Aerodrome	Campo Novo do Parecis, Mato Grosso	13°53′03″S 057°52′02″W	
SDNZ		Concórdia Corporate Heliport	Nova Lima, Minas Gerais	19°59′02″S 043°56′45″W	
SDOA		Lagoa da Floresta Farm Aerodrome	Barra do Corda, Maranhão	05°29′12″S 045°04′59″W	
SDOB		São José O.B. Farm Aerodrome	Tapiratiba, São Paulo	21°25′31″S 046°45′16″W	
SDOC		Hospital do Coração Heliport	São Paulo, São Paulo	23°34′23″S 046°38′37″W	
SDOD		Vida Farm Aerodrome	Grajaú, Maranhão	05°50′14″S 045°31′52″W	
SDOE		Sibéria Farm	Grajaú, Maranhão	05°43′09″S 045°46′45″W	
SDOF		Palladio Building Heliport	São Paulo, São Paulo	23°35′42″S 046°41′08″W	
SDOG		Península Heliport	Guarujá, São Paulo	23°59′50″S 046°12′11″W	
SDOH		Pedreira Pau Pedra Heliport	Guarulhos, São Paulo	23°21′03″S 046°25′33″W	
SDOI		National Parachuting Centre Aerodrome	Boituva, São Paulo	23°17′53″S 047°41′31″W	
SDOJ		Ecobalsa Heliport	Rio de Janeiro, Rio de Janeiro	23°00′40″S 043°22′40″W	
SDOK		Casas Bahia Heliport	Jundiaí, São Paulo	23°14′10″S 046°51′57″W	
SDOL		Agropecuária São Paulo Farm Aerodrome	Tapurah, Mato Grosso	12°26′33″S 056°54′28″W	
SDOM		Catuama II Heliport	Goiana, Pernambuco	07°39′56″S 034°49′48″W	
SDON		Ônix Heliport	São Paulo, São Paulo	23°33′05″S 046°43′20″W	
SDOO		Órion Heliport	Goiânia, Goiás	16°41′49″S 049°16′11″W	
SDOP		EMS Sigma Pharma 2 Heliport	Hortolândia, São Paulo	22°53′45″S 047°11′26″W	
SDOQ		Campo Claro Farm Aerodrome	Ribeirão Cascalheira, Mato Grosso	12°40′27″S 051°44′22″W	
SDOR		Mosquito Farm	Orlândia, São Paulo	20°44′51″S 047°53′22″W	
SDOS		Banaer de Sete Barras Aerodrome	Sete Barras, São Paulo	24°25′09″S 047°52′09″W	
SDOT		Attilio Tinelli Heliport	São Paulo, São Paulo	23°36′09″S 046°41′37″W	
SDOU	OUS	Jornalista Benedito Pimentel Airport	Ourinhos, São Paulo	22°58′25″S 049°54′41″W	Formerly SBOU
SDOV		Mozarlândia Aerodrome	Mozarlândia, Goiás	14°46′08″S 050°33′54″W	
SDOW	OIA	Ourilândia do Norte Airport	Ourilândia do Norte, Pará	06°45′47″S 051°03′00″W	
SDOX		Água Fria Farm	Xinguara, Pará	07°00′55″S 049°21′58″W	
SDOY		Monte Dourado Farm Aerodrome	São Félix do Xingu, Pará	06°13′26″S 051°45′24″W	
SDOZ		Laranjeiras Farm Heliport	Areal, Rio de Janeiro	22°12′26″S 043°05′47″W	
SDPA		Portobello Farm Aerodrome	Mangaratiba, Rio de Janeiro	22°55′39″S 044°04′48″W	
SDPB		Prime Business Centre Heliport	Franca, São Paulo	20°32′10″S 047°23′24″W	
SDPC		Atena Aerodrome	Rancharia, São Paulo	22°09′10″S 051°01′43″W	
SDPD		Pindamonhangaba Airport	Pindamonhangaba, São Paulo	22°56′38″S 045°25′55″W	
SDPE	PNB	Porto Nacional Airport	Porto Nacional, Tocantins	10°43′05″S 048°23′56″W	
SDPG		Palacio Guanabara Heliport	Rio de Janeiro, Rio de Janeiro	22°56′26″S 043°11′16″W	
SDPH		Piratininga Farm Aerodrome	São Miguel do Araguaia, Goiás	12°49′21″S 050°19′39″W	
SDPI		Makukem Aerodrome	Uiramutã, Roraima	04°41′16″N 060°14′41″W	Closed
SDPJ		Cidade Empresarial Heliport	Aparecida de Goiânia, Goiás	16°45′00″S 049°18′17″W	
SDPK		Panco I Heliport	São Paulo, São Paulo	23°31′41″S 046°29′42″W	
SDPL		Ibirapuera Park Hotel Heliport	São Paulo, São Paulo	23°35′34″S 046°38′58″W	
SDPM		Palácio dos Bandeirantes Heliport	São Paulo, São Paulo	23°36′02″S 046°42′47″W	
SDPN		Penápolis Airport	Penápolis, São Paulo	21°24′36″S 050°02′01″W	
SDPO		Plaza Centenário Heliport	São Paulo, São Paulo	23°36′20″S 046°41′46″W	
SDPP		Fortaleza Farm Aerodrome	Paranapanema, São Paulo	23°17′35″S 048°48′52″W	
SDPQ		Napoleão Aerodrome	Normandia, Roraima	03°54′24″N 060°01′33″W	
SDPR		Turazzi Farm Aerodrome	Pontes e Lacerda, Mato Grosso	15°09′20″S 059°18′37″W	
SDPS		Mário Covas State Hospital Heliport	Santo André, São Paulo	23°40′15″S 046°31′58″W	
SDPT		Parque Paulista Heliport	São Paulo, São Paulo	23°33′37″S 046°39′33″W	
SDPU		Paquetá Heliport	Rio de Janeiro, Rio de Janeiro	22°46′01″S 043°06′46″W	
SDPV		Presidente Venceslau Airport	Presidente Venceslau, São Paulo	21°53′36″S 051°53′04″W	
SDPW		Piracicaba Airport	Piracicaba, São Paulo	22°42′38″S 047°37′10″W	
SDPX		Nova Vitória Aerodrome	Pacaraima, Roraima	04°29′56″N 060°56′30″W	
SDPY		Pirassununga	Pirassununga, São Paulo	22°01′40″S 047°25′18″W	
SDPZ		Sossego Aerodrome	Ribas do Rio Pardo, Mato Grosso do Sul	21°14′28″S 053°21′05″W	
SDQA		Aldebaran Farm Aerodrome	Angélica, Mato Grosso do Sul	21°55′26″S 053°56′26″W	
SDQB		Estrela D'Alva Farm Aerodrome	Querência, Mato Grosso	13°11′21″S 052°18′25″W	
SDQC		Quarto Comar Heliport	São Paulo, São Paulo	23°33′50″S 046°36′45″W	
SDQD		Candelária Farm Aerodrome	Vila Bela da Santíssima Trindade, Mato Grosso	16°06′40″S 060°00′47″W	
SDQE		Ilha do Caracará Aerodrome	Poconé, Mato Grosso	17°27′25″S 056°50′28″W	
SDQF		Floresta Farm Aerodrome	Santo Antônio da Barra, Goiás	17°35′53″S 050°41′40″W	
SDQG		Nova Floresta Farm Aerodrome	Caiabu, São Paulo	21°53′32″S 051°10′41″W	
SDQH		Santa Clara Farm Aerodrome	Castanheira, Mato Grosso	10°39′13″S 058°36′09″W	
SDQI		Quilombo Farm Heliport	Indaiatuba, São Paulo	23°04′27″S 047°05′12″W	
SDQJ		Santo Antônio da Serra do Boqueirão Farm Aerodrome	Wanderley, Bahia	11°39′37″S 043°49′09″W	
SDQK		Taboca Farm	Rio Verde de Mato Grosso, Mato Grosso do Sul	18°53′04″S 055°22′03″W	
SDQL		Cerro Azul Farm Aerodrome	Nioaque, Mato Grosso do Sul	21°11′02″S 055°44′03″W	
SDQM		Santo Antônio Farm Aerodrome	Barreiras, Bahia	11°42′19″S 045°59′29″W	
SDQN		Palmares 2 Farm Aerodrome	Barreiras, Bahia	11°39′23″S 046°03′09″W	
SDQO		São Quirino Farm Heliport	Morungaba, São Paulo	22°55′02″S 046°50′44″W	
SDQP		Parque Cultural Paulista Heliport	São Paulo, São Paulo	23°34′18″S 046°38′42″W	Closed
SDQQ		Companhia Agricola de Quata Aerodrome	Quatá, São Paulo	22°17′08″S 050°38′22″W	
SDQR		Alto da Serra Heliport	Bom Jardim da Serra, Santa Catarina	28°23′54″S 049°34′34″W	
SDQS		Alpendre Eventos Heliport	Taubaté, São Paulo	23°08′15″S 045°28′30″W	
SDQT		Vista Alegre Farm Aerodrome	Novo Horizonte do Sul, Mato Grosso do Sul	22°35′52″S 053°41′27″W	
SDQU		Colorado Farm Aerodrome	Bom Jesus, Piauí	09°15′21″S 044°48′24″W	
SDQV		Pavão Heliport	Guarulhos, São Paulo	23°25′58″S 046°24′38″W	
SDQW		Guararema Heliport	Guararema, São Paulo	23°19′35″S 046°07′43″W	
SDQX		Falcão Farm Aerodrome	Primavera do Leste, Mato Grosso	15°23′58″S 054°10′52″W	
SDQY		Iguatemi Campinas Shopping Centre Heliport	Campinas, São Paulo	22°53′29″S 047°01′42″W	
SDQZ		Espinhaço II Farm Aerodrome	Barra do Garças, Mato Grosso	15°23′50″S 052°04′13″W	
SDRA		Fazenda das Represas Aerodrome	São Miguel Arcanjo, São Paulo	23°52′38″S 048°03′03″W	
SDRB		Renaissance Hotel Heliport	São Paulo, São Paulo	23°33′32″S 046°39′44″W	
SDRC		Santana Farm Aerodrome	Rancharia, São Paulo	22°10′55″S 050°51′57″W	
SDRD		Andorinha Farm	Estrela do Norte, Goiás	13°46′55″S 049°05′19″W	
SDRE		Recreio Heliport	Rio de Janeiro, Rio de Janeiro	23°00′29″S 043°26′49″W	
SDRF		Recanto Feliz Farm Aerodrome	Rio Claro, Rio de Janeiro	22°44′46″S 044°03′03″W	
SDRG		Graciosa Heliport	Pinhais, Paraná	25°23′31″S 049°09′22″W	
SDRH		Chaparral Farm Aerodrome	Campo Grande, Mato Grosso do Sul	20°50′40″S 054°31′34″W	
SDRI		Rio Sul Centre Heliport	Rio de Janeiro, Rio de Janeiro	22°57′26″S 043°10′34″W	
SDRJ		Prefeitura do Rio de Janeiro Heliport	Rio de Janeiro, Rio de Janeiro	22°58′16″S 043°12′59″W	
SDRK		Rio Claro Municipal Airport	Rio Claro, São Paulo	22°25′54″S 047°33′45″W	
SDRL		Retiro Velho Farm Aerodrome	Porto Murtinho, Mato Grosso do Sul	21°26′59″S 057°49′35″W	
SDRM		Olomai Aerodrome	Amajari, Roraima	03°55′36″N 064°11′05″W	
SDRN		Zarzur Heliport	São Paulo, São Paulo	23°34′12″S 046°41′31″W	
SDRO		Darinha Heliport	Cascavel, Ceará	04°06′43″S 038°14′53″W	
SDRP		Onkiola Aerodrome	Amajari, Roraima	03°42′43″N 064°09′45″W	
SDRQ		Brinquinho Farm Aerodrome	São Desidério, Bahia	12°49′38″S 046°15′07″W	
SDRR	QVP	Avaré-Arandu Airport	Avaré, São Paulo	23°05′32″S 048°59′14″W	
SDRS	REZ	Resende Airport	Resende, Rio de Janeiro	22°28′43″S 044°28′54″W	
SDRT		Ponto Geral Aerodrome	Pacaraima, Roraima	04°38′53″N 060°47′16″W	
SDRU		Caramuru Farm Aerodrome	Inúbia Paulista, São Paulo	21°41′36″S 050°56′09″W	
SDRV		Tenoar Aerodrome	Chapadão do Sul, Mato Grosso do Sul	18°44′54″S 052°41′12″W	
SDRW		Reserva Farm Aerodrome	Ribas do Rio Pardo, Mato Grosso do Sul	21°30′41″S 053°03′10″W	
SDRX		Fazenda do Cedro Aerodrome	Chapada, Rio Grande do Sul	28°06′32″S 053°11′48″W	
SDRY		São Paulo Farm Aerodrome	Amambai, Mato Grosso do Sul	22°57′10″S 054°50′43″W	
SDRZ		Vó Zita do Rio Vermelho Farm Aerodrome	Corumbá, Mato Grosso do Sul	19°36′54″S 056°52′52″W	
SDSA		Califórnia Farm Aerodrome	Corumbá, Mato Grosso do Sul	18°02′08″S 055°42′59″W	
SDSB		São Sebastião Farm Aerodrome	Rifaina, São Paulo	19°59′45″S 047°31′26″W	Closed
SDSC	QSC	São Carlos International Airport	São Carlos, São Paulo	21°52′35″S 047°54′12″W	
SDSD		Samã I Aerodrome	Pacaraima, Roraima	04°24′43″N 060°57′06″W	
SDSE		Sítio Santa Helena Aerodrome	Gabriel Monteiro, São Paulo	21°28′20″S 050°37′11″W	
SDSF		Florianópolis Federal Police Heliport	Florianópolis, Santa Catarina	27°34′23″S 048°31′54″W	
SDSG		Ipiranga Aerodrome	Alto Taquari, Mato Grosso	17°44′47″S 053°21′19″W	
SDSH		Shalon Farm Aerodrome	Alta Floresta, Mato Grosso	09°59′16″S 056°40′35″W	
SDSI		Alice Farm Aerodrome	Sambaíba, Maranhão	07°37′39″S 045°41′34″W	
SDSJ		Executivo Aerodrome	Cascavel, Paraná	24°52′17″S 053°27′55″W	
SDSK		Dona Rosa S. Rezek Farm	Jateí, Mato Grosso do Sul	22°42′53″S 054°02′41″W	
SDSL		Bang Bang Farm Aerodrome	São José do Xingu, Mato Grosso	10°53′24″S 052°44′05″W	
SDSM		Our Lady of the Conception Farm Aerodrome	São Manuel, São Paulo	22°45′30″S 048°32′38″W	
SDSN		São Luiz Heliport	São Paulo, São Paulo	23°35′26″S 046°41′12″W	
SDSO		Flamingos Heliport	Angra dos Reis, Rio de Janeiro	23°01′23″S 044°17′24″W	
SDSP		Santa Inês Aerodrome	Amajari, Roraima	04°08′11″N 061°20′25″W	
SDSQ		Usina Santa Rita Aerodrome	Santa Rita do Passa Quatro, São Paulo	21°43′25″S 047°39′25″W	
SDSR		Ibiúna Substation Heliport	Ibiúna, São Paulo	23°39′33″S 047°06′12″W	
SDSS		Baía das Pedras Farm Aerodrome	Aquidauana, Mato Grosso do Sul	19°15′16″S 055°47′00″W	
SDST		Santa Therezinha da Barra Farm Aerodrome	Descalvado, São Paulo	21°52′53″S 047°46′31″W	
SDSU		Pirelli Sumaré Heliport	Sumaré, São Paulo	22°48′00″S 047°11′30″W	Closed
SDSV		Santa Cândida Farm Aerodrome	Guariba, São Paulo	21°20′01″S 048°10′16″W	
SDSW		Carta Fabril 01 Heliport	Piraí, Rio de Janeiro	22°34′56″S 043°59′33″W	
SDSX		ITM Expo Heliport	São Paulo, São Paulo	23°31′34″S 046°44′38″W	
SDSY		Riviera Portofino Heliport	Piracaia, São Paulo	22°59′54″S 046°22′06″W	
SDSZ		Banco Safra Heliport	São Paulo, São Paulo	23°33′29″S 046°39′35″W	
SDTA		Dilceu Dal Bosco Aviação Aerodrome	Sinop, Mato Grosso	11°46′59″S 055°32′24″W	
SDTB		Atibaia Aerodrome	Atibaia, São Paulo	23°07′42″S 046°34′29″W	
SDTC		Edel Trade Centre Heliport	São Paulo, São Paulo	23°36′09″S 046°39′38″W	
SDTD		Campanário Farm Aerodrome	Laguna Carapã, Mato Grosso do Sul	22°46′56″S 055°04′25″W	
SDTE		Tapijara Farm Aerodrome	Arandu, São Paulo	23°13′14″S 049°04′32″W	
SDTF		Tatuí Municipal Aerodrome	Tatuí, São Paulo	23°19′55″S 047°52′48″W	
SDTG		Atrium IV Building Heliport	São Paulo, São Paulo	23°35′35″S 046°41′12″W	
SDTH		Tamanduá Farm Aerodrome	Brasnorte, Mato Grosso	13°08′24″S 057°34′36″W	
SDTI		Tupi Paulista Municipal Airport	Tupi Paulista, São Paulo	21°23′36″S 051°36′03″W	
SDTJ		Atrium V Building Heliport	São Paulo, São Paulo	23°35′41″S 046°41′06″W	
SDTK	JPY	Paraty Airport	Paraty, Rio de Janeiro	23°13′26″S 044°43′24″W	
SDTL		Natural Drinks Jarinu Heliport	Jarinu, São Paulo	23°02′17″S 046°41′45″W	Closed
SDTM		Crystal Tower Heliport	Barueri, São Paulo	23°29′36″S 046°51′10″W	
SDTN		REC Berrini TNU Heliport	São Paulo, São Paulo	23°36′29″S 046°41′48″W	
SDTO		Cataco Farm Aerodrome	Ubarana, São Paulo	21°15′19″S 049°47′41″W	
SDTP		Tupã Airport	Tupã, São Paulo	21°53′24″S 050°30′21″W	
SDTQ		Tribuna Square Heliport	Santos, São Paulo	23°56′12″S 046°19′18″W	
SDTR		Triunfo Farm Aerodrome	Vila Bela da Santíssima Trindade, Mato Grosso	16°07′47″S 059°53′51″W	
SDTS		Planalto Farm Aerodrome	Jaraguari, Mato Grosso do Sul	20°20′18″S 054°24′57″W	
SDTT		Região das Hortênsias Heliport	Gramado, Rio Grande do Sul	29°21′42″S 050°51′11″W	
SDTU		Itaúsa Heliport	São Paulo, São Paulo	23°38′11″S 046°38′31″W	
SDTV		São Miguel Farm Aerodrome	São Desidério, Bahia	12°36′39″S 046°14′47″W	
SDTW		Mirage Farm Aerodrome	Sapezal, Mato Grosso	13°35′58″S 058°31′23″W	
SDTX		São José Farm Aerodrome	Ilha Solteira, São Paulo	20°32′31″S 051°21′27″W	
SDTY		São Martinho S/A Aerodrome	Pradópolis, São Paulo	21°20′23″S 048°06′53″W	
SDTZ		Fortaleza Farm Aerodrome	Santa Filomena, Piauí	08°52′14″S 045°33′40″W	
SDUA		Vale do Curuá Aerodrome	Novo Progresso, Pará	07°02′18″S 055°23′33″W	
SDUB	UBT	Ubatuba Airport	Ubatuba, São Paulo	23°26′29″S 045°04′34″W	
SDUC		Santa Rita Aerodrome	Uiramutã, Roraima	04°25′48″N 060°10′53″W	Closed
SDUD		Usina Santa Adelia Aerodrome	Jaboticabal, São Paulo	21°19′56″S 048°18′59″W	
SDUE		Thália Farm Aerodrome	Balsa Nova, Paraná	25°31′13″S 049°40′56″W	
SDUF		Touro Peru Farm Aerodrome	Porto Murtinho, Mato Grosso do Sul	21°04′50″S 057°30′24″W	
SDUG		Santa Rosa Aerodrome	Pacaraima, Roraima	04°14′41″N 061°09′27″W	Closed
SDUH		Villa Otto Baumgart Heliport	Campos do Jordão, São Paulo	22°44′37″S 045°33′47″W	
SDUI		Iudice Business Centre Heliport	São Paulo, São Paulo	23°30′49″S 046°41′41″W	
SDUJ		Millennium Heliport	São Paulo, São Paulo	23°35′00″S 046°41′00″W	
SDUK		Xaimite Farm Aerodrome	Água Boa, Mato Grosso	14°05′28″S 052°54′15″W	
SDUL		Santa Lydia Aerodrome	Ribeirão Preto, São Paulo	21°12′06″S 047°55′17″W	
SDUM		Uniban Heliport	São Paulo, São Paulo	23°30′23″S 046°35′49″W	
SDUN	ITP	Ernani do Amaral Peixoto Airport	Itaperuna, Rio de Janeiro	21°13′09″S 041°52′33″W	
SDUO		Southeast Logistics Park Heliport	Vitória da Conquista, Bahia	14°54′42″S 040°52′12″W	
SDUP		Hotel Portobello Heliport	Mangaratiba, Rio de Janeiro	22°56′57″S 044°04′28″W	
SDUQ		Paraguaçu Paulista Airport	Paraguaçu Paulista, São Paulo	22°25′37″S 050°36′25″W	
SDUR		Itaboraí Aerodrome	Itaboraí, Rio de Janeiro	22°42′46″S 042°50′32″W	
SDUS		Sucuri Farm Aerodrome	Machadinho d'Oeste, Rondônia	09°11′26″S 061°46′14″W	
SDUT		Hotel Transamérica Heliport	São Paulo, São Paulo	23°39′03″S 046°43′22″W	Closed
SDUU		Usina Califórnia Aerodrome	Parapuã, São Paulo	21°54′40″S 050°52′05″W	
SDUV		Columbia Heliport	Serra, Espírito Santo	20°10′37″S 040°13′56″W	
SDUW		Sertãozinho Farm Heliport	Botelhos, Minas Gerais	21°38′35″S 046°20′44″W	
SDUX		Havan Heliport	Brusque, Santa Catarina	27°06′25″S 048°54′27″W	
SDUY		Mariowy Aerodrome	Apiacás, Mato Grosso	07°57′32″S 057°50′25″W	
SDUZ		Fortaleza Farm Heliport	Taubaté, São Paulo	23°10′43″S 045°28′16″W	
SDVA		Campo Vitória Farm Aerodrome	Vargem Grande do Sul, São Paulo	21°50′34″S 046°55′59″W	
SDVB		INA Brasil Heliport	Sorocaba, São Paulo	23°26′09″S 047°24′52″W	
SDVC		Valda Costa Heliport	Maragogi, Alagoas	08°55′04″S 035°09′51″W	
SDVD		Vila Real Heliport	Petrópolis, Rio de Janeiro	22°24′33″S 043°08′53″W	
SDVE		Vera Cruz Airport	Vera Cruz, São Paulo	22°13′49″S 049°49′01″W	
SDVF		Santo Antônio do Pão Aerodrome	Uiramutã, Roraima	04°35′23″N 060°10′53″W	
SDVG	VOT	Votuporanga Airport	Votuporanga, São Paulo	20°27′26″S 050°00′09″W	
SDVH		Vale Eldorado Aerodrome	Bragança Paulista, São Paulo	23°00′19″S 046°38′13″W	
SDVI		Comandante Gastão Aerodrome	Tangará da Serra, Mato Grosso	14°38′44″S 057°30′10″W	
SDVJ		Santa Marta Farm Aerodrome	Santa Maria das Barreiras, Pará	08°39′34″S 050°27′20″W	
SDVK		São Pedro Farm	Nova Andradina, Mato Grosso do Sul	21°47′41″S 053°28′28″W	
SDVL		Casa da Pedra Heliport	Porto Feliz, São Paulo	23°20′08″S 047°25′31″W	
SDVM		Minas Gerais Farm Aerodrome	Pontes e Lacerda, Mato Grosso	14°46′23″S 059°02′51″W	
SDVN		SMS Heliport	Campos do Jordão, São Paulo	22°41′22″S 045°33′10″W	
SDVO		Clube Voart	Araguaína, Tocantins	07°17′13″S 048°08′04″W	
SDVP		São Luiz Cotingo	Uiramutã, Roraima	04°20′02″N 060°29′37″W	
SDVQ		Cabeceira Verde Farm	Campos Lindos, Tocantins	08°09′23″S 046°44′19″W	
SDVR		Pátio Victor Malzoni Heliport	São Paulo, São Paulo	23°35′12″S 046°40′54″W	
SDVS		Vassoural Farm Aerodrome	Pontal, São Paulo	21°04′27″S 048°01′52″W	
SDVT		Campo Verde Farm Aerodrome	Taquarussu, Mato Grosso do Sul	22°39′06″S 053°30′28″W	
SDVU		Conde Francisco Matarazzo Heliport	São Paulo, São Paulo	23°33′48″S 046°39′10″W	
SDVV		Cragea-Suzano Heliport	Suzano, São Paulo	23°38′31″S 046°19′20″W	
SDVW		Volkswagen do Brasil Fábrica III Heliport	Taubaté, São Paulo	23°03′25″S 045°37′55″W	
SDVX		Santa Amália Farm Aerodrome	Alta Floresta, Mato Grosso	10°18′28″S 056°34′45″W	
SDVY		Vitalli Aerodrome	Avanhandava, São Paulo	21°31′20″S 049°59′45″W	
SDVZ		Kareli Aerodrome	Parelhas, Rio Grande do Norte	06°38′27″S 036°39′13″W	
SDWA		Aerogalo Heliport	Angra dos Reis, Rio de Janeiro	23°02′30″S 044°11′36″W	
SDWB		CYK Heliport	São Paulo, São Paulo	23°33′58″S 046°39′06″W	
SDWC		Agropastoril Bom Pastor Aerodrome	Rondonópolis, Mato Grosso	16°28′01″S 054°42′50″W	
SDWD		REIK Campos do Jordão Heliport	Campos do Jordão, São Paulo	22°42′33″S 045°32′39″W	
SDWE		Palmeiras Farm Aerodrome	Corumbá, Mato Grosso do Sul	18°56′00″S 057°02′57″W	
SDWF		Sapan Aerodrome	Pacaraima, Roraima	04°34′27″N 060°44′23″W	
SDWG		Santa Maria Farm Aerodrome	São Desidério, Bahia	13°03′33″S 045°07′58″W	
SDWH		Avanhandava Farm Aerodrome	José Bonifácio, São Paulo	21°11′22″S 049°56′13″W	
SDWI		Lagoa do Cavalo Farm Aerodrome	Gravatá, Pernambuco	08°10′18″S 035°38′04″W	
SDWJ		Protetor Farm Aerodrome	Campo Novo do Parecis, Mato Grosso	13°19′45″S 058°02′31″W	
SDWK		Junqueira Aerodrome	Igarapava, São Paulo	20°00′06″S 047°46′03″W	Closed
SDWL		Três Marias Aerodrome	Itupeva, São Paulo	23°11′23″S 047°04′16″W	Closed
SDWM		Modelo Farm Aerodrome	Aurora do Pará, Pará	02°15′55″S 047°35′43″W	
SDWN		Barreiro Grande Farm Aerodrome	Colômbia, São Paulo	20°20′53″S 048°46′31″W	
SDWO		Sauba Aerodrome	Amajari, Roraima	03°51′50″N 062°34′47″W	
SDWP		Pontal de Itapirapuan Heliport	Angra dos Reis, Rio de Janeiro	22°57′28″S 044°20′17″W	
SDWQ	ALT	Alenquer Airport	Alenquer, Pará	01°55′01″S 054°43′22″W	
SDWR		Rio Preto Farm Aerodrome	São Félix do Araguaia, Mato Grosso	11°28′32″S 051°41′14″W	
SDWS		ALLTA Helicentre Heliport	Barueri, São Paulo	23°30′10″S 046°55′10″W	
SDWT		World Trade Centre Heliport	São Paulo, São Paulo	23°36′33″S 046°41′46″W	
SDWU		Anahi Farm Aerodrome	Porto Murtinho, Mato Grosso do Sul	21°42′07″S 057°44′25″W	
SDWV		Chácara Maringá Aerodrome	Senador José Porfírio, Pará	02°34′22″S 051°57′13″W	
SDWW		Milano Heliport	Florianópolis, Santa Catarina	27°35′16″S 048°32′34″W	
SDWX		Sol Nascente Aerodrome	Itaituba, Pará	06°09′29″S 056°25′40″W	Closed
SDWY		Caridade Heliport	Santa Maria, Rio Grande do Sul	29°41′30″S 053°48′21″W	
SDWZ		Palo Verde Aerodrome	Araçatuba, São Paulo	21°11′29″S 050°33′42″W	
SDXA		SAWI Aerodrome	Normandia, Roraima	04°12′43″N 060°00′16″W	
SDXB		Piracuruca Aerodrome	Piracuruca, Piauí	03°53′29″S 041°42′39″W	
SDXC		Santa Maria Estate Aerodrome	Jacareacanga, Pará	08°54′15″S 056°55′29″W	
SDXD		Guará Farm Aerodrome	Jaborandi, Bahia	14°38′23″S 045°48′17″W	
SDXE		Jeremias de Paula Martins Aerodrome	Jaboticabal, São Paulo	21°15′48″S 048°21′19″W	
SDXF		Alto Paraíso de Goiás Airport	Alto Paraíso de Goiás, Goiás	14°07′09″S 047°31′49″W	
SDXG		Seringueiras Tradição Heliport	Seringueiras, Rondônia	11°45′50″S 063°01′18″W	
SDXH		Gandini Heliport	Itu, São Paulo	23°15′05″S 047°19′37″W	
SDXI		Cel Porto Aerodrome	Camapuã, Mato Grosso do Sul	19°08′21″S 053°42′14″W	
SDXJ		Costa Rica Airport	Costa Rica, Mato Grosso do Sul	18°29′29″S 053°10′06″W	
SDXK		Ticoça Aerodrome	Uiramutã, Roraima	04°24′48″N 060°07′00″W	
SDXL		Santa Clara Farm Heliport	Cordeiro, Rio de Janeiro	22°02′16″S 042°20′13″W	
SDXM		Monte Cristo Aerodrome	Monte Belo, Minas Gerais	21°21′47″S 046°24′03″W	
SDXN		Parada Havan Heliport	Barra Velha, Santa Catarina	26°38′04″S 048°42′02″W	
SDXO		Barra Grande Farm Aerodrome	Tomazina, Paraná	23°35′21″S 050°02′08″W	
SDXP		Guararema Parque Hotel Heliport	Guararema, São Paulo	23°25′27″S 046°01′13″W	
SDXQ		Internacional Plaza II Heliport	São Paulo, São Paulo	23°35′28″S 046°40′56″W	
SDXR		Romário Farm Aerodrome	Barbosa, São Paulo	21°16′46″S 050°00′25″W	
SDXS		Piquiri Aero Agrícola Aerodrome	Juara, Mato Grosso	11°13′45″S 057°29′55″W	
SDXT		Encontro das Águas Heliport	São Manuel, São Paulo	22°36′54″S 048°23′16″W	
SDXU		Relu Farm Aerodrome	Gaúcha do Norte, Mato Grosso	13°37′36″S 053°15′53″W	
SDXV		Magazine Luiza Heliport	Louveira, São Paulo	23°07′02″S 046°59′32″W	
SDXW		Sombra da Serra Farm Aerodrome	Rio Verde de Mato Grosso, Mato Grosso do Sul	18°59′48″S 055°07′59″W	
SDXX		Santa Vitória Farm Heliport	Queluz, São Paulo	22°30′37″S 044°44′54″W	
SDXY		Sitio Cajuapara Aerodrome	Itinga do Maranhão, Maranhão	04°33′53″S 047°32′41″W	
SDXZ		Agrorosso Farm Aerodrome	São Miguel do Passa Quatro, Goiás	16°55′44″S 048°41′00″W	
SDYA		Carmo Couri Heliport	São Paulo, São Paulo	23°35′46″S 046°41′14″W	
SDYB		São José do Bom Retiro Farm Aerodrome	Itapetininga, São Paulo	23°47′04″S 048°20′18″W	
SDYC		Amarras Heliport	Armação dos Búzios, Rio de Janeiro	22°46′29″S 041°54′06″W	
SDYD		Senna Heliport	Angra dos Reis, Rio de Janeiro	23°02′24″S 044°11′47″W	
SDYE		São Diego Farm Aerodrome	Formosa do Rio Preto, Bahia	10°37′41″S 045°44′39″W	
SDYF		Irmãos Munaretto Farm	Lucas do Rio Verde, Mato Grosso	13°06′38″S 055°59′35″W	
SDYG		Rosa do Deserto Farm	Ubaíra, Bahia	13°14′22″S 039°45′36″W	
SDYH		José Roberto Magalhães Teixeira Heliport	Campinas, São Paulo	22°55′45″S 047°04′58″W	
SDYI		Buritiz Farm Aerodrome	São Gonçalo do Abaeté, Minas Gerais	17°55′05″S 045°25′14″W	
SDYJ		José Martins da Silva Aerodrome	Regente Feijó, São Paulo	22°13′34″S 051°20′55″W	
SDYK		Tower 2000 Heliport	Niterói, Rio de Janeiro	22°53′32″S 043°07′06″W	
SDYL		Linhares Geração S/A Heliport	Linhares, Espírito Santo	19°31′58″S 039°48′07″W	Closed
SDYM		Mater Dei–Contorno Heliport	Belo Horizonte, Minas Gerais	19°55′37″S 043°57′28″W	
SDYN		Esmeralda Farm Aerodrome	Taciba, São Paulo	22°35′04″S 051°18′16″W	
SDYO		Santa Marcelina Hospital Heliport	São Paulo, São Paulo	23°33′13″S 046°27′41″W	Closed
SDYP		Piracaia Heliport	Piracaia, São Paulo	22°59′09″S 046°20′04″W	
SDYQ		Querência Farm Aerodrome	Rio Verde de Mato Grosso, Mato Grosso do Sul	18°51′15″S 054°40′22″W	
SDYR		Panco II Heliport	São Paulo, São Paulo	23°35′58″S 046°41′58″W	
SDYS		Aeroportobelo Aerodrome	Porto Belo, Santa Catarina	27°10′30″S 048°37′55″W	
SDYT		Tucuxim Aerodrome	Amajari, Roraima	03°45′50″N 063°59′13″W	
SDYU		Pericó Vinícola Heliport	São Joaquim, Santa Catarina	28°17′56″S 049°55′21″W	
SDYV		SECOVI Heliport	São Paulo, São Paulo	23°36′13″S 046°38′54″W	
SDYW		Luzilandia Aerodrome	Luzilândia, Piauí	03°32′14″S 042°22′21″W	
SDYX		Campo Maior Airport	Campo Maior, Piauí	04°51′15″S 042°15′38″W	
SDYY		Renascença Business Centre Heliport	São Luís, Maranhão	02°29′55″S 044°17′05″W	
SDYZ		Kuka Heliport	São Paulo, São Paulo	23°34′09″S 046°36′05″W	
SDZA		Península Heliport	Brasília, Federal District	15°49′50″S 047°52′00″W	
SDZB		ICS Guarujá Heliport	Guarujá, São Paulo	23°59′08″S 046°17′04″W	
SDZC		Uxiu Aerodrome	Mucajaí, Roraima	02°42′29″N 062°40′08″W	
SDZD		ABB Sorocaba Heliport	Sorocaba, São Paulo	23°25′31″S 047°21′43″W	
SDZE		Ita Heliport	Itapecerica da Serra, São Paulo	23°42′05″S 046°49′43″W	
SDZF		Lamarão Farm Aerodrome	Brasília, Federal District	15°59′03″S 047°28′03″W	
SDZG		Pedro Teixeira Castelo Airport	Tauá, Ceará	05°56′00″S 040°17′51″W	
SDZH		Santa Helena Farm	Pindamonhangaba, São Paulo	22°53′26″S 045°29′35″W	
SDZI		Trijunção Farm Aerodrome	Jaborandi, Bahia	14°47′43″S 046°00′18″W	
SDZJ		Fly Green Heliport	Jaíba, Minas Gerais	15°17′02″S 043°49′52″W	
SDZK		Waphuta Aerodrome	Alto Alegre, Roraima	02°59′30″N 063°42′35″W	
SDZL		Campo Zélia Farm Aerodrome	Corumbá, Mato Grosso do Sul	18°36′27″S 055°41′24″W	
SDZM		Zimba D. Pedro I Heliport	Itatiba, São Paulo	23°02′02″S 046°44′01″W	
SDZN		Warogarem Aerodrome	Uiramutã, Roraima	04°48′22″N 060°13′10″W	
SDZO		Waromada Aerodrome	Uiramutã, Roraima	04°34′39″N 060°26′37″W	
SDZP		Ninho do Pássaro III Heliport	Indaial, Santa Catarina	26°53′07″S 049°14′35″W	
SDZQ		Zen Tower Heliport	Itajaí, Santa Catarina	26°54′18″S 048°39′25″W	
SDZR		SESI-FIESP Heliport	São Paulo, São Paulo	23°33′49″S 046°39′17″W	
SDZS		Serra Branca Agrícola Aerodrome	Uruçuí, Piauí	08°00′43″S 044°43′20″W	
SDZT		Pravda Heliport	Barueri, São Paulo	23°29′50″S 046°50′47″W	
SDZU		Anhumas Farm Aerodrome	Marabá Paulista, São Paulo	22°07′21″S 052°11′52″W	
SDZV		Lagoa Vermelha Farm Aerodrome	Guiratinga, Mato Grosso	16°13′55″S 053°25′09″W	
SDZW		Jonis Pereco Aerodrome	Buritizeiro, Minas Gerais	17°35′30″S 045°02′57″W	
SDZX		Suri Farm Aerodrome	Campinápolis, Mato Grosso	14°48′48″S 053°07′27″W	
SDZZ		Sítio São José Aerodrome	Nova Europa, São Paulo	21°47′52″S 048°32′38″W	

== SE - Ecuador ==
Also see airport category and list.

ICAO	IATA	Airport name	Community	Coordinates	Notes
SEAG		Avisky Duran Heliport	Durán	02°09′52″S 079°50′51″W	
SEAM	ATF	Chachoan Airport	Ambato	01°12′45″S 078°34′28″W	
SEAS		Avisky Heliport	Machala	03°17′31″S 079°52′59″W	
SEBB		La Balbina Heliport	Quito Canton	00°20′48″S 078°28′43″W	
SEBJ		El Buijo Heliport	Samborondón	02°03′53″S 079°51′45″W	
SEBV		Bursal Heliport	Machala	03°16′55″S 079°55′20″W	
SEBZ		Cumbaratza Airport	Cumbaratza, Zamora-Chinchipe Province	04°01′09″S 078°53′15″W	
SECA	LOH	Ciudad de Catamayo Airport	Loja	03°59′45″S 079°22′20″W	
SECE	WSE	Santa Cecilia Airport	Santa Cecilia, Sucumbíos	00°04′15″N 076°59′30″W	
SECO	OCC	Francisco de Orellana Airport	Coca	00°27′40″S 076°59′15″W	
SECS		Costa Carranza Heliport	Jaramijó	00°58′49″S 080°39′25″W	
SECU	CUE	Mariscal Lamar International Airport	Cuenca	02°53′22″S 078°59′05″W	
SECX		Crimasa Heliport	Durán	02°10′28″S 079°51′25″W	
SEDL		Delipesca Heliport	Jaramijó	00°55′48″S 080°39′51″W	
SEEF		Eurofish Manta Heliport	Montecristi	01°00′32″S 080°41′25″W	
SEEM		EMSECOR Heliport	Quito Canton	00°13′21″S 078°22′41″W	
SEEQ		Ecuacorrientes Heliport	El Pangui Canton	03°33′48″S 078°27′34″W	
SEES		ENDESA Heliport	Quito Canton	00°17′19″S 078°32′27″W	
SEXF		La Fabril Heliport	Montecristi	00°59′45″S 080°41′19″W	
SEFF		Francisco Fernandez Zapata Heliport	Manta	00°56′57″S 080°46′16″W	
SEGC		Country Club Heliport	Samborondón	02°03′49″S 079°48′30″W	
SEGQ		Guayaquil Clinic Heliport	Guayaquil	02°11′07″S 079°52′49″W	
SEGS	GPS	Seymour Airport	Galápagos (Baltra)	00°27′14″S 090°15′57″W	
SEGU	GYE	José Joaquín de Olmedo International Airport	Guayaquil	02°09′27″S 079°53′01″W	
SEGZ		Gualaquiza Airport	Gualaquiza	03°25′25″S 078°34′00″W	
SEIB		Atahualpa Airport	Ibarra	00°20′20″N 078°08′10″W	Closed
SEII		General Villamil Airport	Puerto Villamil, Isabela Island	00°56′34″S 090°57′11″W	
SEIL		Impalcasa Heliport	Guayaquil	02°08′18″S 079°54′52″W	
SEJD	TNW	Jumandy Airport	Tena	01°03′35″S 077°35′00″W	
SELA		La Costa Airways Heliport	Durán	02°11′58″S 079°48′51″W	
SELN		Belen Heliport	Santo Domingo	00°14′31″S 079°18′46″W	
SELT	LTX	Cotopaxi International Airport	Latacunga	00°54′25″S 078°36′57″W	
SEMA	MRR	J. M. Velasco Ibarra Airport	Macará	04°22′45″S 079°56′29″W	
SEMC	XMS	Edmundo Carvajal Airport	Macas	02°18′00″S 078°07′15″W	
SEMH	MCH	General Manuel Serrano Airport	Machala	03°16′08″S 079°57′41″W	Closed
SEMO		El Carmen Airport	Montalvo	02°04′00″S 076°58′35″W	
SEMP		Portoviejo Metropolitan Heliport	Portoviejo	01°04′49″S 080°30′51″W	
SEMS		Radar Monjas Heliport	Quito Canton	00°14′11″S 078°28′40″W	
SEMT	MEC	Eloy Alfaro International Airport	Manta	00°56′45″S 080°40′43″W	
SENL	LGQ	Lago Agrio Airport	Lago Agrio	00°05′35″N 076°52′05″W	
SEOS		Omarsa Heliport	Durán	02°11′10″S 079°51′33″W	
SEPT	PYO	Putumayo Airport	Putumayo	00°06′55″N 075°51′00″W	
SEPV	PVO	Reales Tamarindos Airport	Portoviejo	01°02′29″S 080°28′19″W	
SEQM	UIO	Mariscal Sucre International Airport	Quito	00°06′48″S 078°21′31″W	
SERB		Chimborazo Airport	Riobamba	01°39′15″S 078°39′25″W	
SERO	ETR	Santa Rosa International Airport	El Oro Province	03°26′07″S 079°58′40″W	
SESA	SNC	General Ulpiano Paez Airport	Salinas	02°12′20″S 080°59′20″W	
SESC	SUQ	Sucúa Airport	Sucúa	02°28′15″S 078°10′10″W	
SESM	PTZ	Río Amazonas Airport	Pastaza	01°30′19″S 078°03′46″W	
SEST	SCY	San Cristóbal Airport	San Cristóbal Island, Galápagos Islands	00°54′37″S 089°37′03″W	
SESV	BHA	Los Perales Airport	Bahía de Caráquez	00°36′20″S 080°24′15″W	
SETA	TAU	Taura Air Base	Taura, Guayas	02°15′40″S 079°40′50″W	
SETH	TSC	Taisha Airport	Taisha	02°22′50″S 077°30′10″W	
SETI	TPN	Tiputini Airport	Tiputini	00°46′35″S 075°31′45″W	
SETN	ESM	Colonel Carlos Concha Torres Airport	Esmeraldas	00°58′40″N 079°37′36″W	
SETR	TPC	Tarapoa Airport	Tarapoa	00°07′22″S 076°20′15″W	
SETU	TUA	Teniente Coronel Luis A. Mantilla International Airport	Tulcán	00°48′35″N 077°42′30″W	
SEVP		AERVIPS Heliport	Montecristi	01°05′03″S 080°40′10″W	

== SF - Falkland Islands ==
Also see airport category and list.

- SFAL (PSY) – Port Stanley Airport – Stanley, Falkland Islands – 51°41′08″S 57°46′39″W

== SG - Paraguay ==
Also see airport category and list.

ICAO	IATA	Airport name	Community	Coordinates
SGAM		Ñu Guazú Air Base	Asunción	25°16′25″S 057°31′50″W
SGAS	ASU	Silvio Pettirossi International Airport	Asunción	25°14′23″S 057°31′09″W
SGAY	AYO	Juan de Ayolas Airport	Ayolas	27°22′14″S 056°51′14″W
SGBN		Bahía Negra Airport	Bahía Negra	20°13′51″S 058°10′14″W
SGBV		Icañimby Airport	Bella Vista Norte	22°07′19″S 056°30′27″W
SGCB		Capitán Bado Airport	Capitán Bado	23°15′41″S 055°31′35″W
SGCO	CIO	Teniente Coronel Carmelo Peralta Airport	Concepción	23°26′30″S 057°25′40″W
SGCZ		Don Eduardo Schaerer Vera y Aragon Airport	Caazapá	26°10′08″S 056°21′33″W
SGEN	ENO	Teniente Amin Ayub Gonzalez Airport	Encarnación	27°13′37″S 055°50′14″W
SGES	AGT	Guaraní International Airport	Ciudad del Este	25°27′20″S 054°50′37″W
SGFI	FLM	Filadelfia Airport	Filadelfia	22°21′35″S 060°03′13″W
SGFR		Friesland Airport	Friesland	24°36′20″S 056°47′53″W
SGGR		Salto del Guairá	Salto del Guairá	24°02′00″S 054°21′00″W
SGIB		Itaipu Airport	Hernandarias	25°24′25″S 054°37′10″W
SGLP		Loma Plata Airport	Loma Plata	22°21′24″S 059°50′20″W
SGLV		La Victoria Airport	La Victoria	22°17′45″S 057°52′00″W
SGLZ		La Paz Airport	La Paz	27°00′06″S 055°53′02″W
SGME	ESG	Dr. Luis María Argaña International Airport	Mariscal Estigarribia	22°02′42″S 060°37′18″W
SGMZ		Coronel Jose Maria Argaña Airport	Capitán Meza	26°50′23″S 055°19′44″W
SGNE		Boquerón Airport	Mariscal Estigarribia	22°40′37″S 060°07′07″W
SGOL	OLK	Fuerte Olimpo Airport	Fuerte Olimpo	21°02′45″S 057°53′00″W
SGOV		Coronel Oviedo Airport	Coronel Oviedo	25°31′05″S 056°24′25″W
SGPI	PIL	Carlos Miguel Jiménez Airport	Pilar	26°52′53″S 058°19′04″W
SGPJ	PJC	Dr. Augusto Roberto Fuster Airport	Pedro Juan Caballero	22°38′29″S 055°49′47″W
SGRO		Villa del Rosario Airport	Villa del Rosario	24°25′42″S 057°07′01″W
SGSP		San Pedro de Ycuamandiyú Airport	San Pedro de Ycuamandiyú	24°01′36″S 057°01′24″W
SGST		Santa Teresa Airport	Santa Teresa	22°37′25″S 056°38′05″W
SGVM	VMI	Dr. Juan Plate Airport	Puerto Vallemi	22°09′30″S 057°56′35″W
SGVO		Volendam Airport	Volendam	24°17′08″S 057°00′43″W

== SH - Chile ==
Codes beginning with SH are used for heliports.

Also see airport category and list.

ICAO	IATA	Airport name	Community	Coordinates	Notes
SHAB		Aguas Blancas Heliport	Puchuncaví	32°39′56″S 071°26′25″W	
SHAC		Asociación Chile de Seguridad Heliport (closed)	Santiago	33°23′37″S 070°37′56″W	Closed
SHAD		Matanzas Heliport	Navidad	33°58′04″S 071°51′13″W	
SHAE		Aerorescate Heliport	Pudahuel	33°26′23″S 070°49′53″W	
SHAF		Santa Carolina Heliport	Vichuquén	34°49′34″S 072°03′59″W	
SHAG		Ánguila Heliport 1	Primavera	52°29′58″S 068°43′32″W	
SHAL		Los Paltos Heliport	Isla de Maipo	33°43′32″S 070°55′49″W	
SHAO		Ovalle Hospital Heliport	Ovalle	30°34′43″S 071°11′30″W	
SHAP		Asistencia Pública Dr. Alejandro del Río Heliport	Santiago	33°26′40″S 070°38′17″W	
SHAS		Aerosentrans Heliport	Pudahuel	33°26′24″S 070°49′54″W	
SHAU		Santa Rosa Heliport	Coltauco	34°15′19″S 071°01′50″W	
SHAV		Alta Vista Heliport	Zapallar	32°37′18″S 071°23′58″W	
SHBC		Las Brisas de Chicureo Heliport	Santiago	33°14′23″S 070°41′46″W	
SHBE		Edificio Exterior Heliport	Santiago	33°26′24″S 070°38′48″W	
SHBH		Eagle Copters Heliport	Colina	33°16′17″S 070°39′01″W	
SHBI		Quillota-Petorca Biprovincial Hospital Heliport	Quillota	32°54′06″S 071°15′11″W	
SHBL		Ramón Barros Luco Hospital Heliport	San Miguel	33°29′07″S 070°38′40″W	
SHBO		Olimpo Base Heliport	Lo Barnechea	33°21′34″S 070°16′01″W	
SHBS		Banco Santander Heliport	Santiago	33°26′30″S 070°39′08″W	
SHCA		Prefectura Aeropolicial de Carabineros Heliport	La Reina	33°27′19″S 070°32′54″W	
SHCB		Caburga Heliport (closed)	Pucón	39°10′01″S 071°45′38″W	Closed
SHCC		Clínica Las Condes Heliport	Las Condes	33°23′06″S 070°31′48″W	
SHCD		Clínica Alemana Santiago Heliport	Vitacura	33°23′31″S 070°34′22″W	
SHCF		Carlos Cisternas Hospital Heliport	Calama	22°26′40″S 068°55′00″W	
SHCG		Cachagua Heliport	Zapallar	32°34′46″S 071°27′18″W	
SHCH		Agroforestal Heliport	Colina	33°13′16″S 070°45′35″W	
SHCI		San Cristóbal Heliport	Zapallar	32°34′45″S 071°27′18″W	
SHCL		Clínica Las Condes-Peñalolen Heliport	Peñalolén	33°29′23″S 070°32′42″W	
SHCM		Corporativo Mutual Heliport	Santiago	33°26′25″S 070°38′16″W	
SHCV		Claudio Vicuña Hospital Heliport	San Antonio	33°35′19″S 071°36′35″W	
SHCY		Coyhaique Hospital Heliport	Coyhaique	45°34′08″S 072°04′32″W	
SHDG		Batería Dúngenes Heliport 1	San Gregorio	52°22′51″S 068°25′53″W	
SHDH		DAP Helicópteros S.A. Heliport	Punta Arenas	53°10′06″S 070°54′40″W	
SHDN		Daniel Heliport 1	San Gregorio	52°21′53″S 068°45′54″W	
SHDO		Valle Nevado Heliport	Lo Barnechea	33°21′30″S 070°14′58″W	
SHDP		Del Pacífico Heliport	Temuco	38°45′57″S 072°48′18″W	
SHEB		Ejército Bicentenario Heliport	Santiago	33°27′27″S 070°39′27″W	
SHEC		Edificio Itaú Heliport	Las Condes	33°24′59″S 070°35′37″W	
SHEE		Esmeralda Heliport	Yerbas Buenas	35°43′12″S 071°30′35″W	
SHEH		Edificio Huidobro Heliport	Las Condes	33°24′14″S 070°34′21″W	
SHEI		Escuela de Investigaciones Policiales Heliport	Estación Central	33°27′35″S 070°43′00″W	
SHEJ		Cuartel General I División Ejército Heliport	Antofagasta	23°40′57″S 070°24′50″W	
SHEM		El Mercurio Heliport	Vitacura	33°22′51″S 070°35′46″W	
SHEO		RAC Heliport	Colina	33°16′14″S 070°39′02″W	
SHES		ESO Paranal Heliport	Antofagasta	24°38′30″S 070°22′57″W	
SHET		San Esteban Heliport	Yerbas Buenas	35°42′08″S 071°34′20″W	
SHEV		Clínica Las Condes–Edificio Verde A Heliport	Las Condes	33°23′07″S 070°31′52″W	
SHFA		Los Cerrillos Heliport	Cerrillos	33°29′47″S 070°41′43″W	
SHFB		Felix Bulnes Hospital Heliport	Cerro Navia	33°25′28″S 070°44′29″W	
SHFE		San Camilo Hospital Heliport	San Felipe	32°44′55″S 070°42′35″W	
SHFR		San Francisco Heliport	Litueche	34°09′35″S 071°45′06″W	
SHFY		Aerofly Heliport	Talca	35°26′40″S 071°36′04″W	
SHGA		General Humberto Arriagada V. Heliport	Ñuñoa	33°27′02″S 070°36′34″W	
SHGE		Gertrudis Echeñique Heliport	Estación Central	33°25′02″S 070°35′30″W	
SHGF		Gustavo Fricke Hospital Heliport	Viña del Mar	33°01′45″S 071°32′35″W	
SHGO		Los Lirios Heliport	Requínoa	34°13′56″S 070°47′30″W	
SHGR		Edificio CorpGroup Heliport	Las Condes	33°24′16″S 070°34′25″W	
SHGU		El Guanaco Heliport	Quirihue	36°12′49″S 072°37′23″W	
SHHA		Antofagasta Hospital Heliport	Antofagasta	23°37′01″S 070°23′10″W	
SHHC		Clínico Regional de Concepción Hospital Heliport	Concepción	36°49′29″S 073°02′14″W	
SHHE		Machalí Helicopters Heliport	Machalí	34°12′39″S 070°42′57″W	
SHHF		FACH Hospital Heliport	Las Condes	33°23′50″S 070°32′45″W	
SHHI		DIPRECA Hospital Heliport	Las Condes	33°25′04″S 070°31′44″W	
SHHM		San José de Melipilla Hospital Heliport	Melipilla	33°40′48″S 071°11′13″W	
SHHN		Almirante Nef Naval Hospital Heliport	Viña del Mar	32°59′48″S 071°32′09″W	
SHHO		Holvoet Heliport	Copiapó	27°23′50″S 070°15′43″W	
SHHP		Clínico Punta Arenas Hospital Heliport	Punta Arenas	53°07′05″S 070°53′59″W	
SHHR		Carabineros de Chile Heliport	Punta Arenas	53°09′23″S 070°55′20″W	
SHHT		Talca Regional Hospital Heliport	Talca	35°25′36″S 071°38′46″W	
SHHV		Arica Naval Heliport	Arica	18°28′20″S 070°19′14″W	
SHIC		Curicó Provincial Hospital Heliport	Curicó	34°58′47″S 071°12′49″W	
SHIM		Clínica Indisa Maipú Heliport	Maipú	33°28′41″S 070°45′15″W	
SHIN		Clínica Indisa Heliport	Providencia	33°25′15″S 070°37′04″W	
SHIQ		Cuartel General VI División Ejército Heliport	Iquique	20°13′48″S 070°08′42″W	
SHIR		Sumaair Heliport (closed)	Colina	33°15′28″S 070°43′07″W	Closed
SHIS		Isidora 3000 Heliport	Las Condes	33°24′50″S 070°35′53″W	
SHJN		Juan Noé Crevani Heliport	Arica	18°28′58″S 070°18′47″W	
SHJO		San José Hospital Heliport	Independencia	33°24′58″S 070°39′11″W	
SHKI		Kipreos Heliport	Quilicura	33°22′37″S 070°44′40″W	
SHLA		Las Américas Heliport	Santiago	33°26′09″S 070°38′36″W	
SHLB		Central Base Heliport	Lo Barnechea	33°21′06″S 070°17′36″W	
SHLG		La Gonzalina Heliport	Rancagua	34°08′25″S 070°46′16″W	
SHLI		CLC-Chicureo Heliport	Colina	33°16′58″S 070°39′03″W	
SHLJ		Los Junquillos Heliport	Vichuquén	35°57′22″S 071°57′36″W	
SHLL		Puerto Montt Hospital Heliport	Puerto Montt	41°26′45″S 072°57′22″W	
SHLN		Dr. Victor Ríos Ruiz Hospital Heliport	Los Ángeles	37°28′25″S 072°20′47″W	
SHLP		Los Portones Heliport	Lo Barnechea	33°21′34″S 070°31′33″W	
SHLU		Terra Luna Heliport	Chile Chico	46°50′25″S 072°41′28″W	
SHMA		Clínica Santa María Heliport	Providencia	33°25′56″S 070°37′44″W	
SHMD		Ministerio de Defensa Nacional Heliport	Santiago	33°26′07″S 070°38′17″W	
SHME		La Cabaña Heliport	San Pedro	33°58′29″S 071°23′19″W	
SHMM		Marga Marga Provincial Hospital Heliport	Villa Alemana	33°04′02″S 071°22′28″W	
SHMS		Clínico Mutual de Seguridad Hospital Heliport	Estación Central	33°27′26″S 070°42′00″W	
SHNA		Clínica Alemana de Chicureo Medical Centre Heliport	Colina	33°17′11″S 070°39′02″W	
SHNB		Ñuble Regional Heliport	Chillán	36°37′12″S 072°07′06″W	
SHNC		Catalina Norte Heliport 1	Primavera	52°33′49″S 068°40′32″W	
SHNL		Nueva de Lyon Heliport	Providencia	33°25′17″S 070°36′38″W	
SHNO		Catalina Norte Heliport 2	Primavera	52°34′31″S 069°39′49″W	
SHNT		Puerto Natales Hospital Heliport	Puerto Natales	51°43′40″S 072°28′45″W	
SHNZ		Nazareno Heliport (closed)	Pirque	33°39′10″S 070°31′38″W	Closed
SHOL		Santa Laura Heliport	Olmué	32°59′25″S 071°13′05″W	
SHOR		Isidora El Bosque Heliport	Las Condes	33°24′52″S 070°36′05″W	
SHOV		Lo Ovalle Heliport	Casablanca	33°15′03″S 071°22′06″W	
SHPA		Paranal Heliport	Taltal	24°38′30″S 070°22′57″W	
SHPC		Edificio Corporativo CMPC Heliport	Los Ángeles	37°23′34″S 072°21′38″W	
SHPD		Titanium Heliport	Las Condes	33°24′47″S 070°36′13″W	
SHPE		Pelluco Heliport	Puerto Montt	41°29′08″S 072°54′10″W	
SHPG		Publi-G Heliport	La Serena	29°55′33″S 071°16′05″W	
SHPH		Santa Teresa Heliport	Padre Hurtado	33°33′18″S 070°48′56″W	
SHPM		Lago La Paloma Heliport	Coyhaique	45°55′22″S 072°08′46″W	
SHPP		Papudo Heliport	Papudo	32°30′02″S 071°27′35″W	
SHPT		Portillo Heliport	Los Andes	32°50′14″S 070°07′53″W	
SHPU		Punta Catalina Heliport	Primavera	52°32′45″S 068°45′30″W	
SHRA		Gildemeister Heliport	Vitacura	33°22′46″S 070°31′49″W	
SHRB		Rodelbahn Heliport	Santiago	33°27′33″S 070°31′01″W	
SHRE		José Miguel Carrera Heliport	Santiago	33°26′29″S 070°39′19″W	
SHRO		La Rosa Peumo Heliport	Peumo	34°22′15″S 071°10′37″W	
SHRP		Rapel Heliport	Las Cabras	34°12′46″S 071°27′11″W	
SHRZ		Reitz Dos Heliport	Viña del Mar	33°02′34″S 071°31′01″W	
SHSA		Santa María De Liray Heliport	Colina	33°14′46″S 070°43′21″W	
SHSB		Cerro Sombrero Heliport	Primavera	52°46′00″S 069°17′22″W	
SHSC		San Carlos de Ancud Hospital Heliport	Ancud	41°53′11″S 073°48′35″W	
SHSD		Sonda Heliport	Santiago	33°26′15″S 070°39′21″W	
SHSE		Posesión Heliport 1	San Gregorio	52°14′58″S 068°56′12″W	
SHSG		San Gregorio Heliport	San Gregorio	52°37′17″S 070°12′16″W	
SHSH		Santiago SPA Heliport	Huechuraba	33°22′55″S 070°37′32″W	
SHSI		Posesión Heliport 5	San Gregorio	52°16′06″S 069°04′24″W	
SHSJ		San José Hospital Heliport	Osorno, Chile	40°35′21″S 073°07′39″W	
SHSK		Skua Heliport 1	Primavera	52°24′33″S 068°47′07″W	
SHSM		Edificio Torre Santa María Heliport (closed)	Santiago	33°25′00″S 070°37′00″W	Closed
SHSN		San José del Carmen Hospital Heliport	Copiapó	27°22′25″S 070°19′19″W	
SHSO		Santiago Oriente Hospital Heliport	Peñalolén	33°30′08″S 070°34′44″W	
SHSP		Moneda Bicentenario Heliport	Santiago	33°26′34″S 070°39′18″W	
SHSR		Edificio Torre San Ramón Heliport	Providencia	33°25′00″S 070°36′14″W	
SHSS		Temuco Regional Hospital Heliport	Temuco	38°44′10″S 072°35′55″W	
SHST		Santiago Heliport (closed)	Santiago	33°26′28″S 070°38′43″W	Closed
SHSU		Skua Heliport 4	Primavera	52°22′33″S 068°47′19″W	
SHTA		Talagante Provincial Hospital Heliport	Talagante	33°40′01″S 070°55′10″W	
SHTC		Edificio Corporativo CTC Heliport	Providencia	33°26′13″S 070°37′57″W	
SHTE		Santa Graciela Heliport	Teno	34°51′04″S 071°19′26″W	
SHTI		Torre Interamericana Heliport	Santiago	33°26′26″S 070°38′45″W	
SHTL		Torre Ligure Heliport	Concepción	36°49′28″S 073°03′00″W	
SHTO		Alto Hospicio Hospital Heliport	Alto Hospicio	20°17′46″S 070°05′52″W	
SHTR		Sotraser Heliport (closed)	Los Ángeles	37°28′43″S 072°19′36″W	Closed
SHTS		Alto Trapenses Heliport	Lo Barnechea	33°19′20″S 070°35′27″W	
SHUC		Clínica San Carlos de Apoquindo Heliport	Las Condes	33°24′02″S 070°30′28″W	
SHVE		Valle Escondido Heliport	Lo Barnechea	33°20′48″S 070°29′16″W	
SHVI		Villarrica Park Lake Heliport	Villarrica	39°18′07″S 072°05′20″W	
SHVN		Vía Naranja Heliport	Santiago	33°22′06″S 070°33′52″W	
SHWE		Wellford Heliport	San Bernardo	33°39′20″S 070°43′13″W	
SHWT		World Trade Centre Heliport	Santiago	33°24′59″S 070°36′19″W	
SHXE		ETXEA Heliport	Lo Barnechea	33°20′55″S 070°29′36″W	
SHYA		Sumaya Heliport	Pirque	33°40′36″S 070°32′50″W	
