= Zuza =

Zuza may refer to:

- Joseph Mukasa Zuza (1955–2015), Malawian Roman Catholic bishop
- Jurica Žuža (born 1978), Croatian basketball player and coach
- Zuza (footballer, born 1911), Luís Stevan de Siqueira Neto, Brazilian football player
- Zuza (footballer, born 1949), Ieso Antônio do Nascimento, Brazilian football player
