= Zuza (footballer, born 1949) =

Brazilian footballer (1949–2018)

Personal information
- Full name: Ieso Antônio do Nascimento
- Date of birth: 10 April 1949
- Place of birth: Narandiba, Brazil
- Date of death: 16 September 2018 (aged 69)
- Place of death: São José do Rio Preto, Brazil
- Position: Right winger

Youth career
- Grêmio Maringá

Senior career*
Years	Team	Apps	(Gls)
1969–1972	Grêmio Maringá		
1972	→ Cruzeiro (loan)		
1973–1974	América-SP		
1974–1976	Palmeiras	23	(2)
1976	São Paulo	7	(1)
1977	Comercial-SP		
1977	Náutico		
1978–1979	Nacional-SP		
1979	→ Paulista (loan)		
1980–1984	Desportiva-ES		

Managerial career
- 1988: Ibiraçu
- * Club domestic league appearances and goals

Ieso Antônio do Nascimento (10 April 1949 – 16 September 2018), better known as Zuza, was a Brazilian professional footballer who played as a right winger.

== Career ==
Zuza started his professional career at Grêmio Maringá, had a brief spell at Cruzeiro, and then played for América-SP. In 1976, at Palmeiras, he was part of the state champion squad. He played for São Paulo FC during some games at the end of the year. Also had spells for other clubs until arriving at Desportiva de Cariacica, where he won the Espírito Santo championship three times. After retiring, he was a youth coach at several clubs, especially in Espírito Santo.

== Death ==
Zuza died on 16 September 2018 in São José do Rio Preto, aged 69.

== Honours ==
=== Player ===
Palmeiras

- Campeonato Paulista: 1976

Desportiva

- Campeonato Capixaba: 1980, 1981, 1984

=== Manager ===
Ibiraçu

- Campeonato Capixaba: 1988
