= Porto dos Gaúchos =

Coordinates: 11°29′S 57°22′W

- Municipality
- Country: Brazil
- Region: Center-West
- State: Mato Grosso
- Mesoregion: Norte Mato-Grossense

Population (2020)
  - Total: 5,363
- Time zone: UTC−4 (AMT)

Porto dos Gaúchos is a municipality in the state of Mato Grosso in the Central-West Region of Brazil. The environmental conditions in Porto dos Gaúchos resemble those in other municipalities within the central-north region of the state. This area is experiencing rapid expansion driven primarily by unregulated cattle ranching, agriculture, and logging activities. Consequently, the municipality faces significant ecological challenges, including the degradation of permanent preservation areas, widespread burn-offs, and illegal deforestation. In early 2008, Porto dos Gaúchos was designated by the Ministry of the Environment as a priority municipality for initiatives aimed at preventing and combating deforestation in the Legal Amazon.

== See also ==
- List of municipalities in Mato Grosso
