= Chapada, Rio Grande do Sul =

Municipality in Rio Grande do Sul, Brazil

Coordinates: 28°03′18″S 53°04′04″W

- Municipality
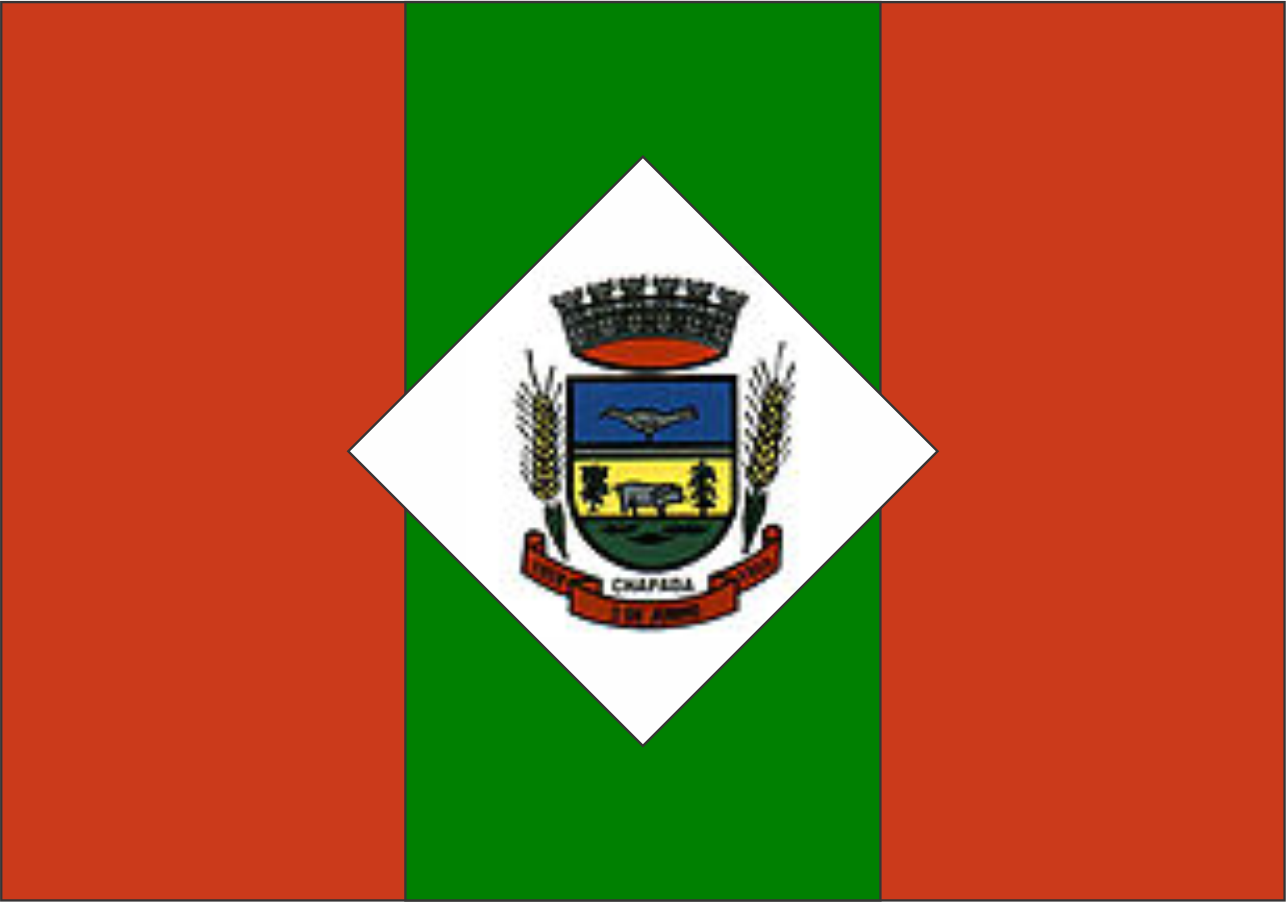
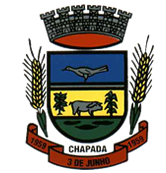
- Flag Coat of arms
- Interactive map of Chapada, Rio Grande do Sul
- Country: Brazil
- Time zone: UTC−3 (BRT)

Chapada is a municipality in the state of Rio Grande do Sul, Brazil. As of 2020, the estimated population was 9,239.

== Regional language ==
- Riograndenser Hunsrückisch (a local variety of the German language belonging to the West Central German dialect group)

== See also ==
- List of municipalities in Rio Grande do Sul
