= Campo Novo do Parecis =

Coordinates: 13.675°S 57.8919°W

- Municipality
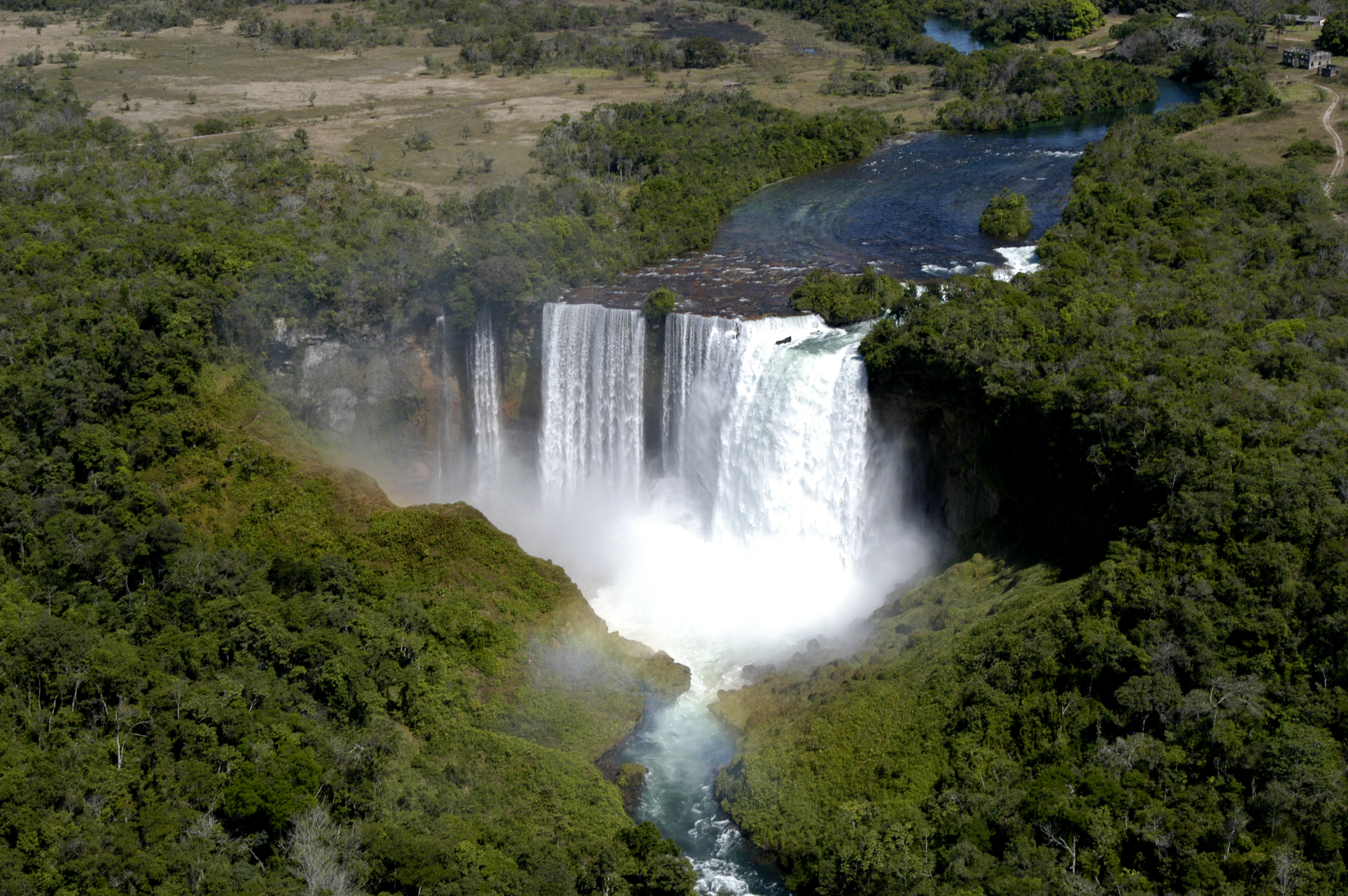

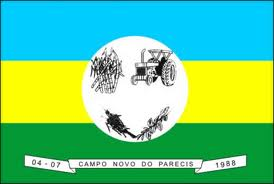
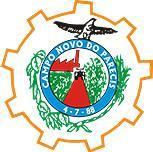
- Flag Coat of arms

- Country: Brazil
- Region: Center-West
- State: Mato Grosso
- Mesoregion: Norte Mato-Grossense

Population (2020)
  - Total: 36,143
- Time zone: UTC−3 (BRT)

Campo Novo do Parecis is a municipality in the state of Mato Grosso in the Central-West Region of Brazil.

== See also ==
- List of municipalities in Mato Grosso
