= Guabiruba =

Municipality in Santa Catarina, Brazil

- Municipality
- Flag Coat of arms

- Country: Brazil
- Region: South
- State: Santa Catarina
- Mesoregion: Vale do Itajai
- Time zone: UTC -3

Guabiruba is a municipality situated in the state of Santa Catarina, Brazil, with an estimated 24,382 inhabitants. It is located in 27°05′09″ S and 48°58′52″ W and 60 m above sea level. It was colonized principally by people from Baden, Germany.

Guabiruba is known as "Pelznickelland".
