= Riachão das Neves =

- Municipality
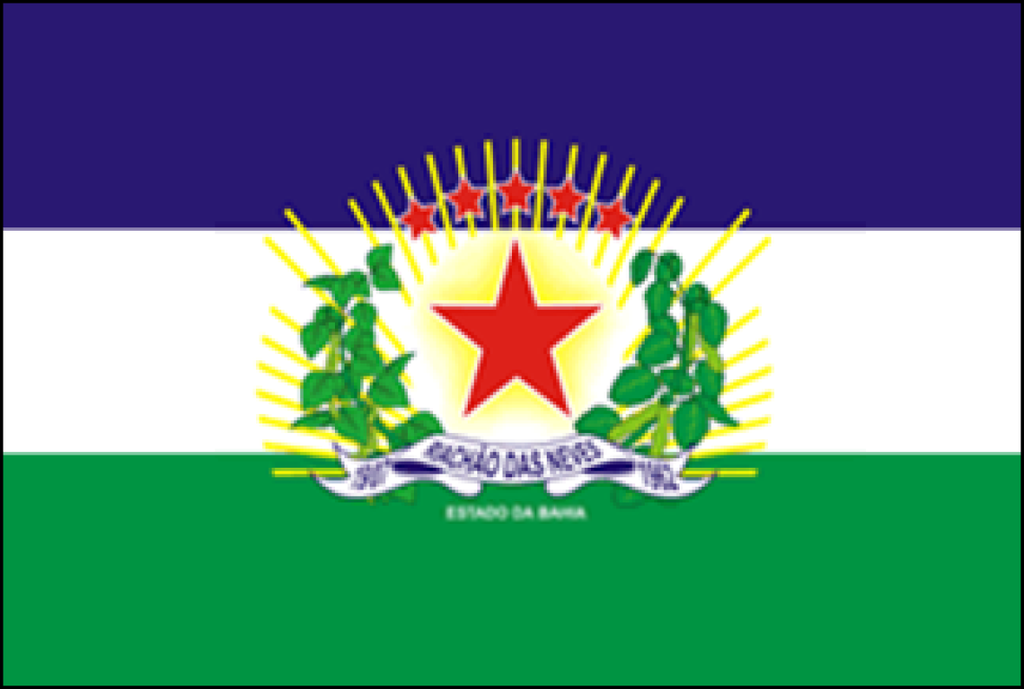
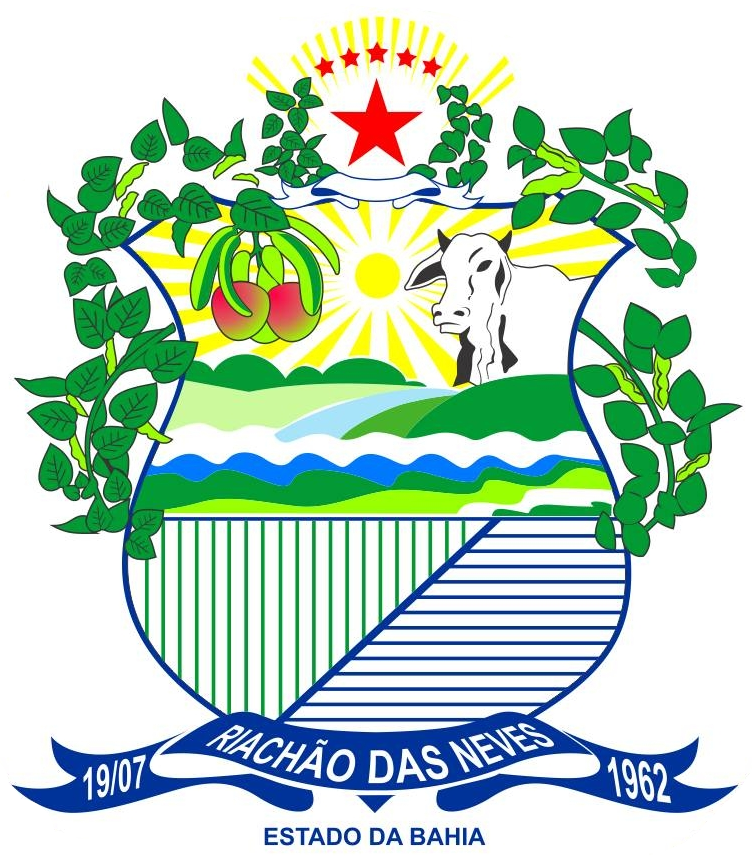
- Flag Coat of arms

- Location in Bahia state

- Location in Brazil
- Coordinates: 11°44′45″S 44°54′36″W
- Country: Brazil
- Region: Northeast
- State: Bahia

Area
  - Total: 5,977.93 km^{2} (2,308.09 sq mi)

Population (2020)
  - Total: 22,334
  - Density: 3.7361/km^{2} (9.6764/sq mi)
- Time zone: UTC−3 (BRT)

Riachão das Neves is a municipality in the state of Bahia in Brazil. The population is 22,334 (2020 est.) in an area of 5,977.93 km^{2} (2,308.09 sq mi).
