= Rio Negro, Mato Grosso do Sul =

Municipality of M. G. do Sul, Brazil

Coordinates: 19°26′56″S 54°59′13″W

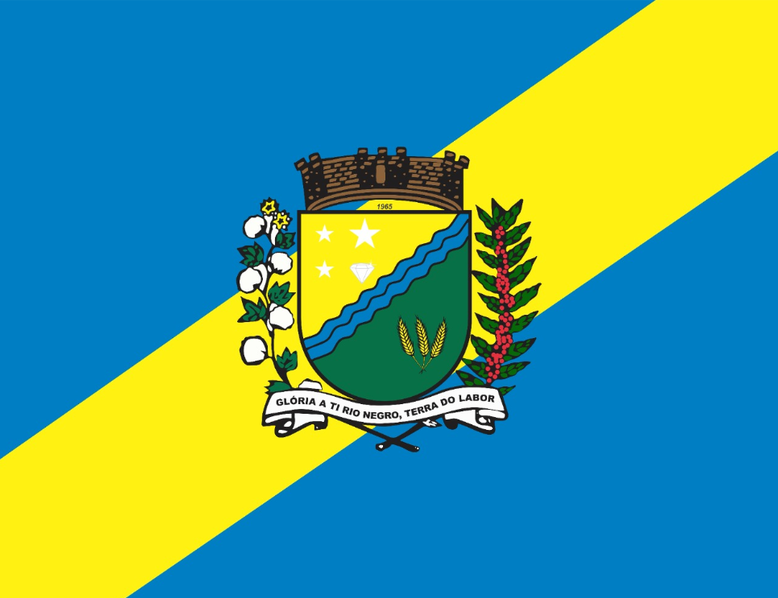
Rio Negro's municipal flag

Rio Negro is a municipality located in the Brazilian state of Mato Grosso do Sul. Its population was 4,793 (2020) and its area is 1,808 km^{2} (698 sq mi).

== See also ==
- List of municipalities in Mato Grosso do Sul
