= Sales Oliveira =

- Municipality
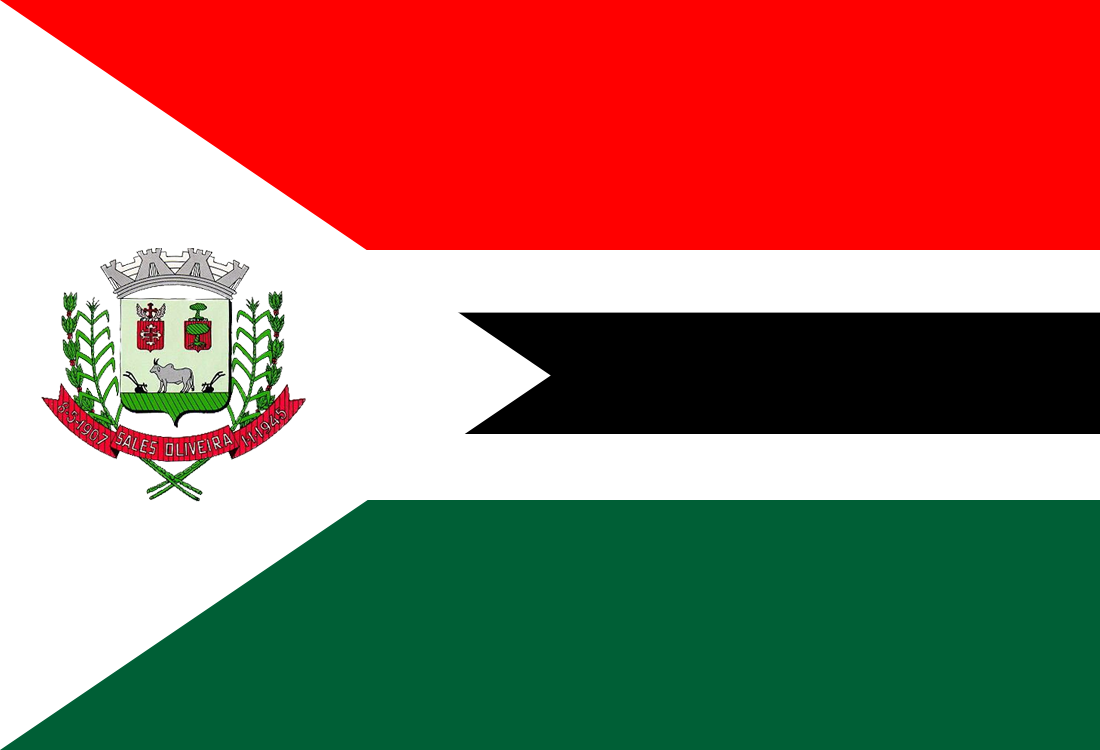
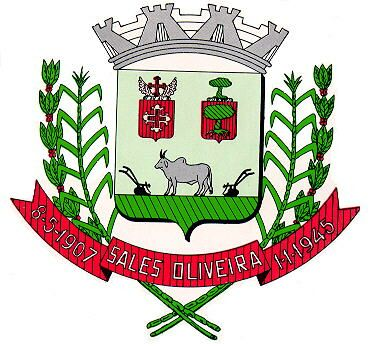
- Flag Coat of arms

- Location in São Paulo state

- Location in Brazil
- Coordinates: 20°46′19″S 47°50′17″W
- Country: Brazil
- Region: Southeast
- State: São Paulo

Area
  - Total: 306 km^{2} (118 sq mi)

Population (2020)
  - Total: 11,998
  - Density: 39.2/km^{2} (102/sq mi)
- Time zone: UTC−3 (BRT)

Sales Oliveira is a municipality in the state of São Paulo in Brazil. The population is 11,998 (2020 est.) in an area of 306 km^{2}. The elevation is 730 m.

== History ==
The municipality was created by state law in 1944.

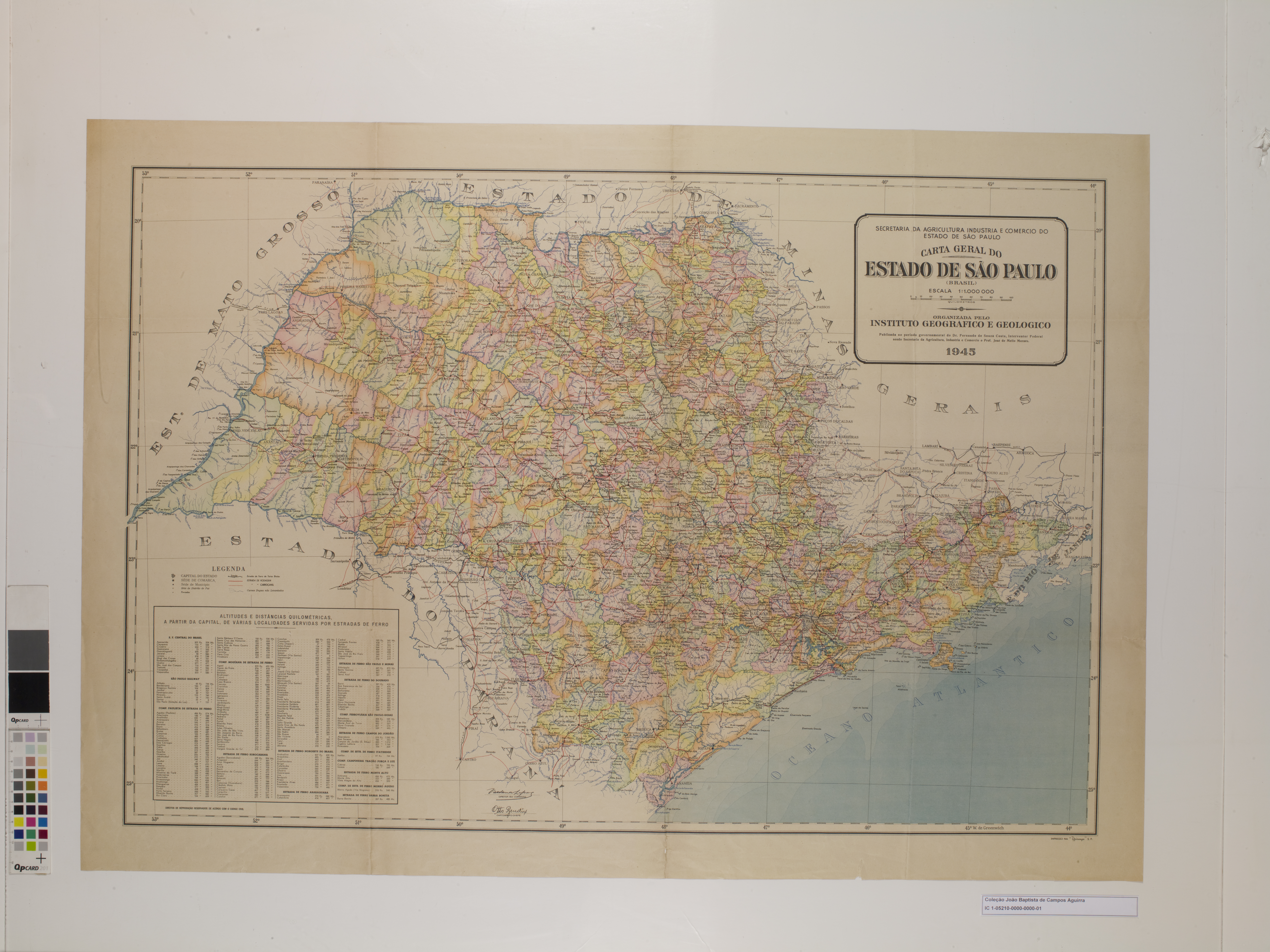
Map of the state of São Paulo (1944).

== See also ==
- List of municipalities in São Paulo
- Interior of São Paulo
