= Jaborandi, Bahia =

Municipality of Bahia, Brazil

Coordinates: 13°37′08″S 44°25′58″W

- Municipality
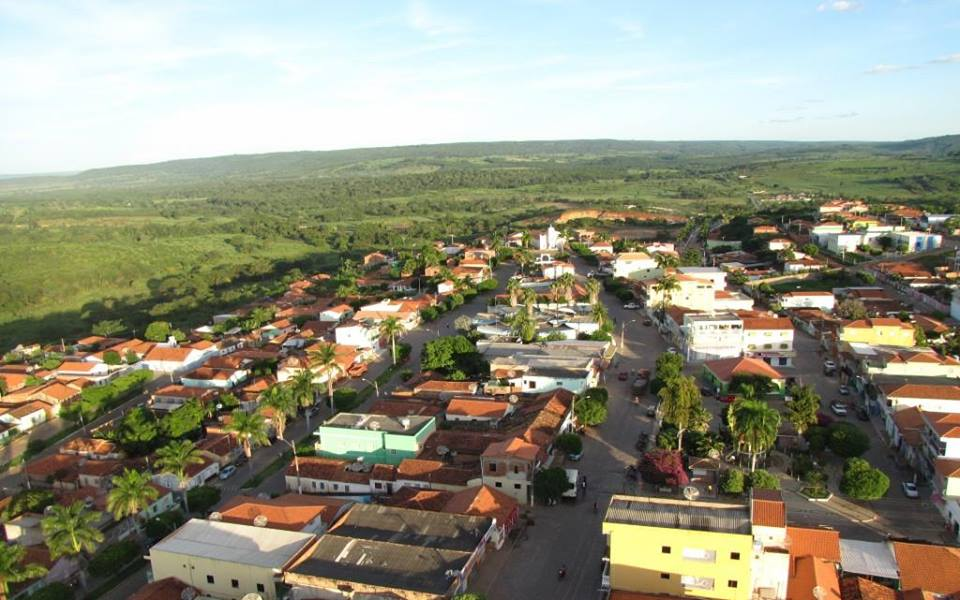
- View of Jaborandi, Bahia

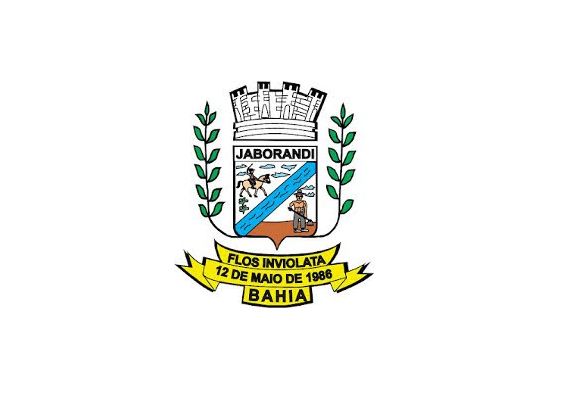
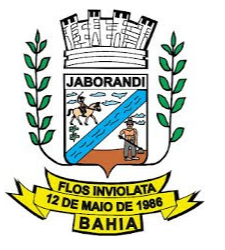
- Flag Coat of arms
- Interactive map of Jaborandi, Bahia
- Country: Brazil
- Region: Nordeste
- State: Bahia

Population (2020)
  - Total: 8,277
- Time zone: UTC−3 (BRT)

Jaborandi, Bahia is a municipality in the state of Bahia in the North-East region of Brazil.

== See also ==
- List of municipalities in Bahia
