= Luzilândia =

Coordinates: 3.45778°S 42.37°W

- Municipality
- Flag Coat of arms

- Country: Brazil
- Region: Nordeste
- State: Piauí
- Mesoregion: Norte Piauiense

Population (2020)
  - Total: 25,504
- Time zone: UTC−3 (BRT)

Luzilândia is a municipality in the state of Piauí in the Northeast region of Brazil.

== Climate ==
Climate data for Luzilândia (1981–2010)
Month	Jan	Feb	Mar	Apr	May	Jun	Jul	Aug	Sep	Oct	Nov	Dec	Year
Mean daily maximum °C (°F)	32.9 (91.2)	31.9 (89.4)	31.2 (88.2)	31.4 (88.5)	32.0 (89.6)	32.2 (90.0)	33.4 (92.1)	35.5 (95.9)	36.5 (97.7)	37.3 (99.1)	36.5 (97.7)	35.6 (96.1)	33.9 (93.0)
Daily mean °C (°F)	27.5 (81.5)	26.9 (80.4)	26.6 (79.9)	26.7 (80.1)	27.2 (81.0)	27.2 (81.0)	27.6 (81.7)	28.5 (83.3)	29.3 (84.7)	29.8 (85.6)	29.7 (85.5)	29.2 (84.6)	28.0 (82.4)
Mean daily minimum °C (°F)	22.7 (72.9)	22.4 (72.3)	22.3 (72.1)	22.5 (72.5)	22.6 (72.7)	22.1 (71.8)	21.8 (71.2)	21.9 (71.4)	22.3 (72.1)	22.8 (73.0)	23.2 (73.8)	23.2 (73.8)	22.5 (72.5)
Average precipitation mm (inches)	186.6 (7.35)	200.9 (7.91)	289.3 (11.39)	297.4 (11.71)	172.9 (6.81)	86.8 (3.42)	39.3 (1.55)	11.5 (0.45)	8.4 (0.33)	12.8 (0.50)	14.7 (0.58)	66.4 (2.61)	1,387 (54.61)
Average precipitation days (≥ 1.0 mm)	12	14	20	20	14	9	4	2	2	1	1	5	104
Average relative humidity (%)	76.5	82.5	84.5	85.5	83.1	80.0	76.6	67.5	62.3	60.8	62.7	67.8	74.2
Mean monthly sunshine hours	183.5	163.0	171.1	162.6	212.9	231.1	270.3	294.1	285.4	289.7	264.5	227.6	2,755.8
Source: Instituto Nacional de Meteorologia

== See also ==
- List of municipalities in Piauí
