= Jaramijó Canton =

- Canton
- Location of Manabí Province in Ecuador.

- Jaramijó Canton in Manabí Province
- Coordinates: 0.94873°S 80.63630°W
- Country: Ecuador
- Province: Manabí Province
- Time zone: UTC-5 (ECT)

Jaramijó Canton is a canton of Ecuador, located in the Manabí Province. Its capital is the town of Jaramijó. Its population at the 2001 census was 11,967.

== Demographics ==
Ethnic groups as of the Ecuadorian census of 2010:

- Mestizo 76.4%
- Afro-Ecuadorian 12.8%
- Montubio 5.0%
- White 4.3%
- Indigenous 0.1%
- Other 1.5%
