= Itupeva =

- Municipality
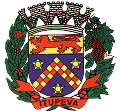
- Flag Coat of arms

- Location in São Paulo state

- Location in Brazil
- Coordinates: 23°9′11″S 47°3′28″W
- Country: Brazil
- Region: Southeast
- State: São Paulo

Area
  - Total: 201 km^{2} (78 sq mi)

Population (2021)
  - Total: 62,813
  - Density: 313/km^{2} (809/sq mi)
- Time zone: UTC−3 (BRT)

Itupeva is a municipality in the state of São Paulo in Brazil. The population is 64,330 (2021 est.) in an area of 201 square kilometres (78 mi^{2}). The elevation is 675 metres (2,215 ft).

== Media ==
In telecommunications, the city was served by Telecomunicações de São Paulo. In July 1998, this company was acquired by Telefónica, which adopted the Vivo brand in 2012. The company is currently an operator of cell phones, fixed lines, internet (fiber optics/4G) and television (satellite and cable).

== See also ==
- List of municipalities in São Paulo
