= List of airports in Paraguay =

This is a list of airports in Paraguay, sorted by location.

== Airports ==
Airport names shown in bold indicate the airport has scheduled service on commercial airlines.

City served / Location	Department	ICAO	IATA	Airport name	Image
Asunción / Luque	Capital District / Central	SGAS	ASU	**Silvio Pettirossi International Airport**	
Ayolas	Misiones	SGAY	AYO	Juan de Ayolas Airport	
Ciudad del Este / Minga Guazú	Alto Paraná	SGES	AGT	**Guaraní International Airport**	
Concepción	Concepción	SGCO	CIO	Teniente Coronel Carmelo Peralta Airport	
Coronel Oviedo	Caaguazú Department	SGOV		Coronel Oviedo Airport	
Encarnación / Capitán Miranda	Itapúa	SGEN	ENO	Teniente Amin Ayub Gonzalez Airport	
Filadelfia	Boquerón	SGFI	FLM	Filadelfia Airport	
Fuerte Olimpo	Alto Paraguay	SGOL		Tte. 1ro Inocencio Herebia Airport	
Hernandarias	Alto Paraná	SGIB		Itaipu Airport	
La Victoria	Alto Paraguay	SGLV		La Victoria Airport	
Loma Plata	Boquerón	SGLP		Loma Plata Airport	
Mariscal Estigarribia	Boquerón	SGME	ESG	Dr. Luis Maria Argaña International Airport	
Pedro Juan Caballero	Amambay	SGPJ	PJC	Dr. Augusto Roberto Fuster International Airport	
Pilar	Ñeembucú	SGPI	PIL	Carlos Miguel Jiménez Airport	
Puerto Vallemi	Concepción	SGVM	VMI	Dr. Juan Plate Airport	
Salto del Guairá	Canindeyú	SGGR		Salto del Guairá Airport	
Santa Teresa	Amambay	SGST		Santa Teresa Airport	

== See also ==
- List of the busiest airports in Paraguay
- Transportation in Paraguay
- List of airports by ICAO code: S#SG - Paraguay
