= Santa Teresa Airport =

- IATA: none; ICAO: SGST

Summary
- Airport type: Public
- Serves: Santa Teresa
- Elevation AMSL: 582 ft / 177 m
- Coordinates: 22°37′25″S 56°38′05″W

Map
- Location of the airport in Paraguay

Runways
Direction	Length		Surface
Direction	m	ft	Surface
02/20	1,797	5,896	Asphalt
- Sources: GCM Google Maps

Santa Teresa Airport (ICAO: SGST) is an airport serving the village of Santa Teresa in Amambay Department, Paraguay.

== See also ==
- List of airports in Paraguay
- Transport in Paraguay
