= SGES =

SGES may refer to:

- Sun GlassFish Enterprise Server
- Shepherd Glen Elementary School
- McMaster School of Geography and Earth Sciences
- ICAO Airport Code for Guaraní International Airport
