= Dr. Luis María Argaña International Airport =

Dr. Luis María Argaña International Airport Aeropuerto Dr. Luis María Argaña
- IATA: ESG; ICAO: SGME

Summary
- Airport type: Military/Public
- Serves: Mariscal Estigarribia, Paraguay
- Elevation AMSL: 553 ft / 169 m
- Coordinates: 22°02′42″S 060°37′18″W

Map
- Location in Paraguay

Runways
Direction	Length		Surface
Direction	m	ft	Surface
01/19	3,500	11,483	Concrete
- Source: DAFIF

Dr. Luis María Argaña International Airport (IATA: ESG, ICAO: SGME) is an airport that serves the small city of Mariscal Estigarribia, in the Boquerón Department of Paraguay.

The airport is named after Luis María Argaña, a vice president who was assassinated in 1999. It is operated by Paraguayan military authorities. GlobalSecurity.org states that some believe the United States are using the airport as a permanent military base. However, they go on to say that this is false.

With 3,500 m (11,483 ft), its runway is the longest in the country, even longer than Asunción's airport.

== Former airline service ==
- LATAM Paraguay (Asunción)

== See also ==
- List of airports in Paraguay
- Transport in Paraguay
