= 2021 Paraguayan Air Force Cessna 402 crash =

2021 aviation incident in Paraguay

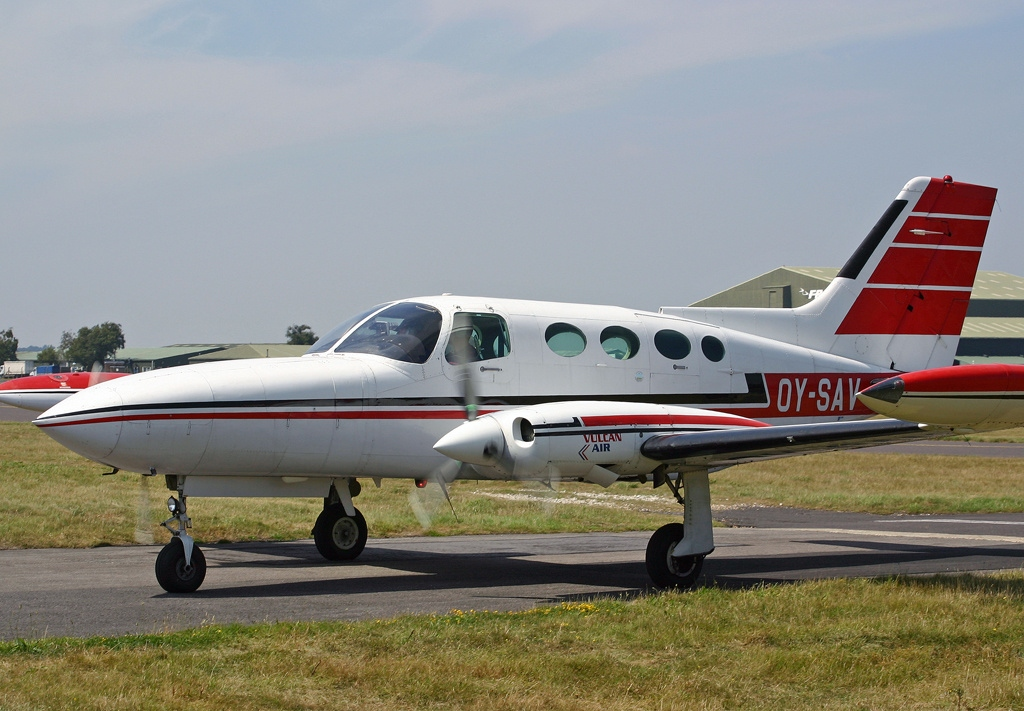
- A Cessna 402B aircraft, similar to the one involved

Accident
- Date: 9 February 2021
- Summary: Under investigation
- Site: Near Ñu Guasu Air Base, Luque, Paraguay.

Aircraft
- Aircraft type: Cessna 402B
- Operator: Paraguayan Air Force
- Registration: 0221
- Flight origin: Fuerte Olimpo Airport, Fuerte Olimpo, Paraguay
- Destination: Silvio Pettirossi International Airport, Asunción, Paraguay
- Occupants: 8
- Passengers: 6
- Crew: 2
- Fatalities: 7
- Injuries: 1
- Survivors: 1

On Tuesday, February 9, 2021, at 2:29 PM, a Cessna 402 aircraft, registration number 0221, belonging to the Space Transport Air Group (GATE) of the Paraguayan Air Force, was reported to have crashed. The plane, carrying 8 people, crashed on the grounds of Ñu Guasu Air Base, in the city of Luque, Gran Asunción. Of the eight occupants on board the aircraft, the pilot and six passengers were killed, while one passenger on board the plane survived, who was left in critical condition.

== Crew and military ==
The crew consisted of:

- Colonel Aníbal Antonio Pérez Trigo, a graduate of the Command and General Staff College.
- 1st Lieutenant and Military Aviator Pilot, Willian Martín Orué Román

The passengers consisted of:

- Major Alfredo Darío Céspedes, a graduate of the General Staff College
- First Lieutenant Marcos Samuel Romero
- Air Force Lieutenant Manuel Guzmán Sotelo Riveros
- Chief Warrant Officer of Aviation, Pedro Nelson López Morales
- The public official, Críspulo Almada
- The civilian José Daniel Zaván, as the sole survivor.

== Events ==
The small plane took off from the town of Fuerte Olimpo, 761 kilometers from the Paraguayan capital, Asunción. He was scheduled to land at Silvio Pettirossi International Airport. The crew was in contact with the control tower for the last time minutes before crashing, without reporting any problem during the flight.

The aircraft carried soldiers that had worked in a survey of the perimeter of Fuerte Olimpo Airport. This after last week an accident almost occurred by an animal accessing the runway. In contrast, the sole survivor had boarded the small plane as a courtesy from the military to get to Asunción faster, where he had to take an exam.

The air traffic control tower reported having communicated with the pilot one minute before the accident, telling him that he was approaching the landing runway (final of basic 02) at Silvio Pettirossi International Airport.

It was speculated that one of the Cessna's engines stopped during the approach, causing the plane to plummet. Security cameras surrounding the incident site show the left engine failing, which is why the aircraft is seen making a violent turn to the left, crashing into the ground, falling over three vehicles that were parked in a concrete parking lot adjacent to the grass. The impact was followed by an explosion. The aircraft crashed in a parking lot of the Fuerza Aérea Paraguaya Command at the Ñu Guasu air base, adjacent to the south of Silvio Pettirossi International Airport

According to preliminary autopsies, it was the impact that instantly ended the lives of 7 of the 8 people on board, as a result of the trauma and bruising from the crash. As previously mentioned, a civilian student was the sole survivor and was taken with serious injuries to the Trauma Hospital in Asunción.

== Investigation ==
After four months of examination, the remains of the crashed plane were examined by experts from the United States. The engines, propellers, as well as components and accessories, were taken to the United States to the manufacturing company to carry out the expert analysis that will determine if there was any technical failure.

Following the report from Cessna, the aircraft manufacturer, an investigation was conducted to determine if there was any failure in the machine's engines.
