= Filadelfia Airport =

- IATA: FLM; ICAO: SGFI

Summary
- Airport type: Public
- Serves: Filadelfia
- Elevation AMSL: 423 ft (129 m)
- Coordinates: 22°21′35″S 60°03′13″W

Map
- Location of the airport in Paraguay

Runways
Direction	Length		Surface
Direction	m	ft	Surface
01/19	1,470	4,823	Gravel
- Sources: GCM Google Maps

Filadelfia Airport (IATA: FLM, ICAO: SGFI) is an airport serving the city of Filadelfia in Boquerón Department, Paraguay.

The Filadelfia non-directional beacon (ident: FIL) is located near the southern end of the field.

== See also ==
- List of airports in Paraguay
- Transport in Paraguay
