= Dr. Juan Plate Airport =

Airport in Paraguay

- IATA: VMI; ICAO: none

Summary
- Airport type: Public
- Serves: Puerto Vallemi
- Elevation AMSL: 280 ft / 85 m
- Coordinates: 22°09′30″S 57°56′35″W

Map
- Location of the airport in Paraguay

Runways
Direction	Length		Surface
Direction	m	ft	Surface
17/35	1,200	3,937	Concrete
- Sources: GCM Google Maps

Dr. Juan Plate Airport (IATA: VMI) is an airport serving the city of Puerto Vallemi in Concepción Department, Paraguay.

== Aerolíneas que cesaron operación ==
LATAM Paraguay (Asunción)

== See also ==
- List of airports in Paraguay
- Transport in Paraguay
