= Teniente Coronel Carmelo Peralta Airport =

Teniente Coronel Carmelo Peralta Airport Concepción Airport
- IATA: CIO; ICAO: SGCO

Summary
- Airport type: Public
- Serves: Concepción
- Elevation AMSL: 249 ft / 76 m
- Coordinates: 23°26′30″S 57°25′40″W

Map
- Location of the airport in Paraguay

Runways
Direction	Length		Surface
Direction	m	ft	Surface
03/21	1,850	6,070	Asphalt
- Sources: GCM Google Maps

Teniente Coronel Carmelo Peralta Airport (IATA: CIO, ICAO: SGCO) is an airport serving the city of Concepción in Concepción Department, Paraguay.

The Concepcion non-directional beacon (ident: CON) is located on the field.

== See also ==
- List of airports in Paraguay
- Transport in Paraguay
