= Saltos del Guairá Airport =

Airport serving Salto del Guairá, Paraguay

- IATA: none; ICAO: SGGR

Summary
- Airport type: Public
- Serves: Saltos del Guairá
- Elevation AMSL: 1,000 ft (300 m)
- Coordinates: 24°02′00″S 54°21′00″W

Map
- Location of the airport in Paraguay

Runways
Direction	Length		Surface
Direction	m	ft	Surface
18/36	1,400	4,593	Asphalt
- Sources: GCM Google Maps

Saltos del Guairá Airport Airport (ICAO: SGGR) is an airport serving the city of Saltos del Guairá in Canindeyú Department, Paraguay. The runway is 4 kilometres (2.5 mi) northwest of town.

== See also ==
- List of airports in Paraguay
- Transport in Paraguay
