= La Victoria Airport =

La Victoria Airport Puerto La Victoria Airport
- IATA: none; ICAO: SGLV

Summary
- Airport type: Public
- Serves: La Victoria
- Elevation AMSL: 286 ft / 87 m
- Coordinates: 22°17′45″S 57°52′00″W

Map
- Location of the airport in Paraguay

Runways
Direction	Length		Surface
Direction	m	ft	Surface
04/22	1,850	6,070	Grass
- Sources: Google Maps

La Victoria Airport (IATA: VMI) is an airstrip near the town of La Victoria in Alto Paraguay Department, Paraguay. The grass runway is 8 kilometres (5.0 mi) east of La Victoria, across the Paraguay River.

Aerial imagery from 2005 shows low brush covering the length of the runway.

== See also ==
- List of airports in Paraguay
- Transport in Paraguay
