= Dr. Augusto Roberto Fuster Airport =

Dr. Augusto Roberto Fuster Airport Aeródromo Dr. Augusto Roberto Fuster
- IATA: PJC; ICAO: SGPJ

Summary
- Airport type: Public
- Serves: Pedro Juan Caballero, Paraguay
- Elevation AMSL: 1,873 ft (571 m)
- Coordinates: 22°38′29″S 055°49′47″W
- Interactive map of Dr. Augusto Roberto Fuster Airport

Runways
Direction	Length		Surface
Direction	m	ft	Surface
03/21	1,800	5,905	Asphalt

Statistics (2025)
- Passengers: 192
- Statistics: DINAC, Source: DAFIF

Dr. Augusto Roberto Fuster Airport (Spanish: Aeródromo Doctor Fuster) (IATA: PJC, ICAO: SGPJ) simply known as Pedro Juan Caballero Airport is a small airport, officially an aerodrome, according to Paraguayan aviation authorities, that serves the city of Pedro Juan Caballero in the Amambay Department of Paraguay.

== See also ==
- List of airports in Paraguay
- Transport in Paraguay
