= Battle of Pilar =

Part of the Paraguayan War

- Part of the Humaitá campaign
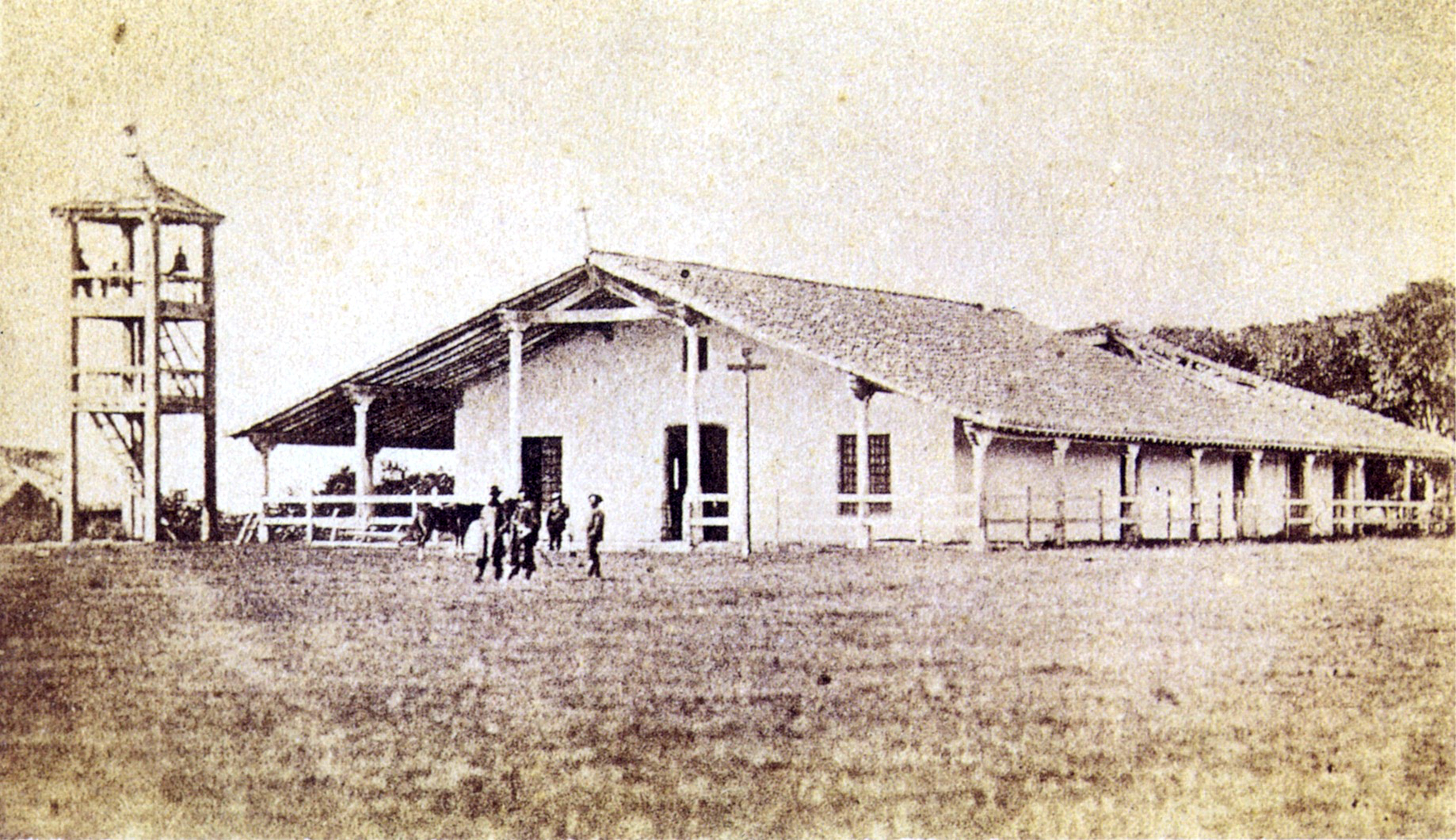
- A church in the Paraguayan town of Pilar after its capture by the Imperial Army.
Date	September 20, 1867
Location	Pilar, Paraguay
Result	Initial Paraguayan victory: later Paraguayan withdrawal and Brazilian occupation.

Belligerents
Empire of Brazil	Paraguay

Commanders and leaders
Viscount of Maracaju	Felipe Toledo

Strength
800 soldiers	400 soldiers and militia

Casualties and losses
300 casualties	174 casualties

The Battle of Villa del Pilar took place during the Paraguayan War. Brazilian forces, under the command of then Colonel Rufino Eneias Gustavo Galvão, advanced on the village on September 20, 1867. About 250 Paraguayan soldiers resisted the attack, and Francisco Solano López ordered Colonel Felipe Toledo to send aid. There were 300 Brazilian casualties against 174 on the Paraguayan side.

== The Battle ==
On September 20, 1867, Colonel Gustavo Galvão landed at the port of Villa del Pilar with 800 Brazilian soldiers. The landing was met by fierce resistance from the small garrison, made up of 250 men and women who lived in the city. Once Marshal López was made aware of the Brazilian attack, he sent his personal escort of about 150 riders under the command of Colonel Felipe Toledo as reinforcements.

The reinforcements landed through a steamer and three small boats. The battle was quick. In a melee, the Paraguayans defeated the imperials, pushing them back to port.

Despite the Paraguayan victory, the Brazilians did great damage to the garrison, capturing close to 200 heads of cattle and other supplies from the village, in addition to 60,000 cartridges and other weapons and ammunition valuable for the Paraguayan war effort.

The village was abandoned on 27 October 1867, after some small skirmishes. It was occupied the following day, October 28.
