= Itaipu Airport =

- IATA: none; ICAO: SGIB

Summary
- Airport type: Public
- Serves: Hernandarias
- Elevation AMSL: 745 ft (227 m)
- Coordinates: 25°24′25″S 54°37′10″W

Map
- Location of the airport in Paraguay

Runways
Direction	Length		Surface
Direction	m	ft	Surface
03/21	1,520	4,987	Asphalt
- Sources: GCM Google Maps

Itaipu Airport (ICAO: SGIB) is an airport serving the city of Hernandarias in Alto Paraná Department, Paraguay.

The Itaipu non-directional beacon (ident: ITU) is located on the field. Both the Ciudad del Este vortac (ident: VES) and the Foz Do Iguacu VOR-DME (ident: FOZ) are within 13 nautical miles (24 kilometres) of the airport.

== See also ==
- List of airports in Paraguay
- Transport in Paraguay
