= Carlos Miguel Jiménez Airport =

Airport in Ñeembucú Department, Paraguay

Carlos Miguel Jiménez Airport Aeropuerto Carlos Miguel Jiménez de Pilar
- IATA: PIL; ICAO: SGPI

Summary
- Airport type: Public
- Serves: Pilar, Paraguay
- Elevation AMSL: 249 ft / 76 m
- Coordinates: 26°52′53″S 058°19′04″W
- Interactive map of Carlos Miguel Jiménez Airport

Runways
| Direction | Length | | Surface |
| Direction | m | ft | Surface |
|---|---|---|---|
| 02/20 | 1,500 | 4,920 | Concrete |
- Source: DAFIF

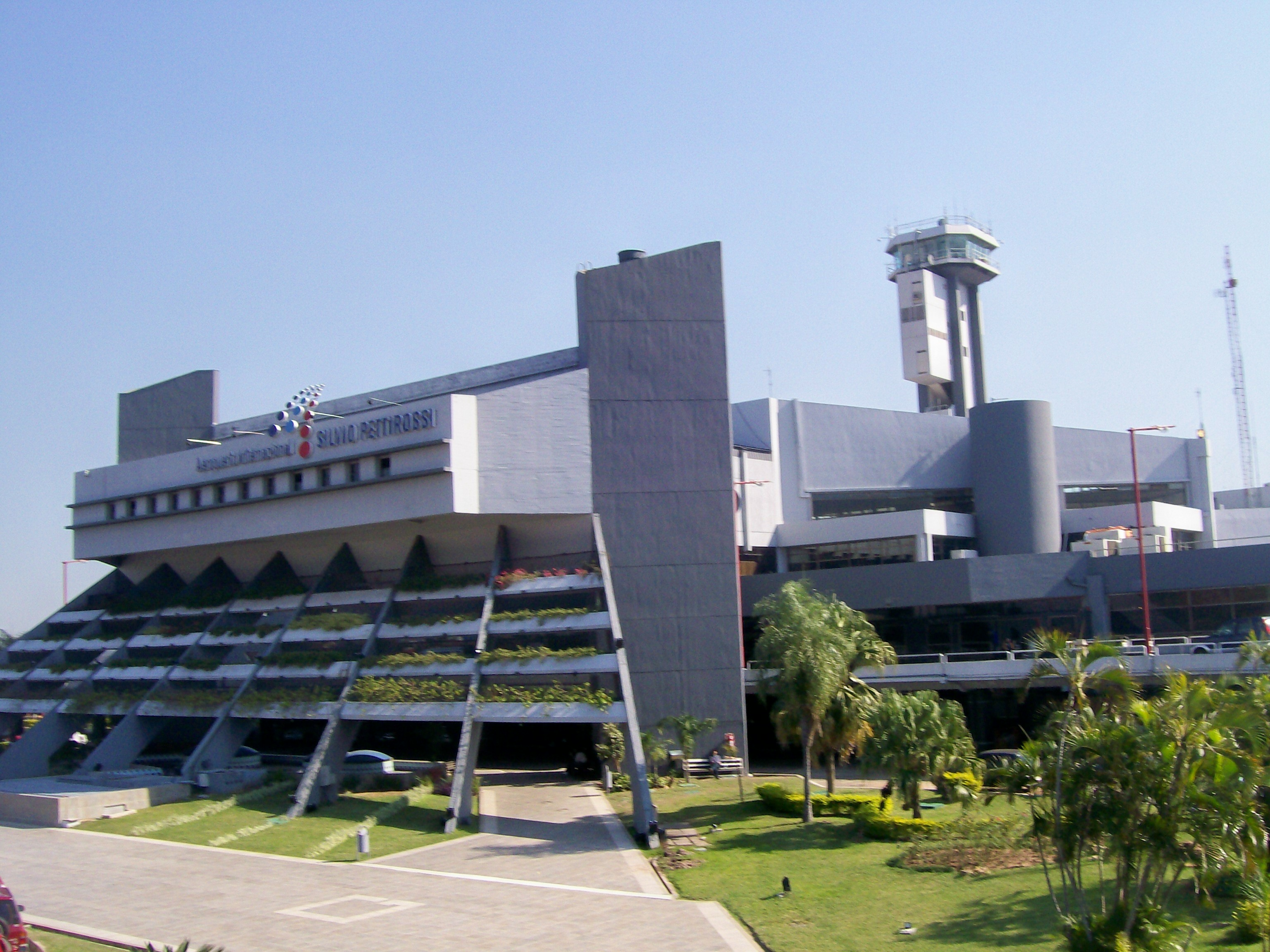
Silvio Pettirossi International Airport

Carlos Miguel Jiménez Airport (IATA: PIL, ICAO: SGPI) is a small airport that serves the city of Pilar, in the Ñeembucú Department of Paraguay.

== See also ==
- List of airports in Paraguay
