= Battle of Apa River =

1867 battle of the Paraguayan War

Battle of the Apa River
- Part of the Mato Grosso campaign
Date	12 May 1867
Location	Near Apa River
Result	Brazilian victory

Belligerents
Paraguay	Empire of Brazil

Commanders and leaders
Unknown	Rufino Galvão

Units involved
Unknown	17th Fatherland Volunteer Battalion

Strength
Unknown	Unknown

Casualties and losses
Unknown	Unknown

The Battle of the Apa River was a military confrontation on May 12 1867 between Brazilian and Paraguayan forces on a farm near the José Carlos stream, on the right bank of the Apa River, in the province of Mato Grosso do Sul, on the border between the belligerents.

During the Paraguayan occupation of the province, the invaders had dominated a farm in the region, later renamed Fazenda Marechal López, where the ultimate combat took place. There, Paraguayans began to develop gardens and raise cattle. The Brazilian forces of the 17th Battalion of Volunteers of the Fatherland, who would later be part of the campaign called Withdrawal from the Lagoon, approached the farm and started the confrontation, on May 12, 1867. The Paraguayans tried to disable the farm, setting the fields on fire, harassing the cattle, then fleeing.
