= List of the busiest airports in Paraguay =

The following is a list of the busiest airports in Paraguay. The airports are ranked by passenger traffic and aircraft movements. For each airport, the lists cite the city served by the airport, not necessarily the district where the airport is physically located.

== 2020 ==
=== Paraguay's busiest airports by passenger traffic ===
Rank	Airport	Serves	Total passengers	Annual change^{A}
1	Silvio Pettirossi International Airport	Asunción	311,813	▼74.87%
2	Guaraní International Airport	Ciudad del Este	7,054	▼78.34%

=== Paraguay's busiest airports by aircraft movements ===
Rank	Airport	Serves	Aircraft movements	Annual change
1	Silvio Pettirossi International Airport	Asunción	35,405	▼33.64%
2	Guaraní International Airport	Ciudad del Este	3,157	▼54.91%

== 2019 ==
=== Paraguay's busiest airports by passenger traffic ===
Rank	Airport	Serves	Total passengers	Annual change^{A}
1	Silvio Pettirossi International Airport	Asunción	1,239,403	▲2.30%
2	Guaraní International Airport	Ciudad del Este	32,573	▼21.53%

=== Paraguay's busiest airports by aircraft movements ===
Rank	Airport	Serves	Aircraft movements	Annual change
1	Silvio Pettirossi International Airport	Asunción	53,353	▼0.17%
2	Guaraní International Airport	Ciudad del Este	7,002	▼0.68%

== 2018 ==
=== Paraguay's busiest airports by passenger traffic ===
Rank	Airport	Serves	Total passengers	Annual change^{A}
1	Silvio Pettirossi International Airport	Asunción	1,211,576	▲2.67%
2	Guaraní International Airport	Ciudad del Este	41,512	▲1.44%

=== Paraguay's busiest airports by aircraft movements ===
Rank	Airport	Serves	Aircraft movements	Annual change
1	Silvio Pettirossi International Airport	Asunción	52,913	▲4.81%
2	Guaraní International Airport	Ciudad del Este	7,050	▲7.16%

== 2017 ==
=== Paraguay's busiest airports by passenger traffic ===
Rank	Airport	Serves	Total passengers	Annual change^{A}
1	Silvio Pettirossi International Airport	Asunción	1,180,111	▲14.22%
2	Guaraní International Airport	Ciudad del Este	40,923	▼6.19%

=== Paraguay's busiest airports by aircraft movements ===
Rank	Airport	Serves	Aircraft movements	Annual change
1	Silvio Pettirossi International Airport	Asunción	50,485	▲5.12%
2	Guaraní International Airport	Ciudad del Este	6,579	▲5.00%

== 2016 ==
=== Paraguay's busiest airports by passenger traffic ===
Rank	Airport	Serves	Total passengers	Annual change^{A}
1	Silvio Pettirossi International Airport	Asunción	1,033,168	▲13.47%
2	Guaraní International Airport	Ciudad del Este	43,622	▲63.62%

=== Paraguay's busiest airports by aircraft movements ===
Rank	Airport	Serves	Aircraft movements	Annual change
1	Silvio Pettirossi International Airport	Asunción	48,025	▲0.17%
2	Guaraní International Airport	Ciudad del Este	6,266	▲1.47%

== 2015 ==
=== Paraguay's busiest airports by passenger traffic ===
Rank	Airport	Serves	Total passengers	Annual change^{A}
1	Silvio Pettirossi International Airport	Asunción	910,554	▼0.53%
2	Guaraní International Airport	Ciudad del Este	27,217	▼23.91%

=== Paraguay's busiest airports by aircraft movements ===
Rank	Airport	Serves	Aircraft movements	Annual change
1	Silvio Pettirossi International Airport	Asunción	47,966	▲4.23%
2	Guaraní International Airport	Ciudad del Este	6,175	▼12.29%

== 2014 ==
=== Paraguay's busiest airports by passenger traffic ===
Rank	Airport	Serves	Total passengers	Annual change^{A}
1	Silvio Pettirossi International Airport	Asunción	915,425	▲9.59%
2	Guaraní International Airport	Ciudad del Este	35,769	▼35.34%

=== Paraguay's busiest airports by aircraft movements ===
Rank	Airport	Serves	Aircraft movements	Annual change
1	Silvio Pettirossi International Airport	Asunción	46,028	▲15.14%
2	Guaraní International Airport	Ciudad del Este	7,040	▲6.83%

== 2013 ==
=== Paraguay's busiest airports by passenger traffic ===
Rank	Airport	Serves	Total passengers	Annual change^{A}
1	Silvio Pettirossi International Airport	Asunción	835,323	▼3.82%
2	Guaraní International Airport	Ciudad del Este	55,523	▼12.7%

=== Paraguay's busiest airports by aircraft movements ===
Rank	Airport	Serves	Aircraft movements	Annual change
1	Silvio Pettirossi International Airport	Asunción	39,907	▼7.91%
2	Guaraní International Airport	Ciudad del Este	6,543	▼9.11%
