= Fuerte Olimpo Airport =

Fuerte Olimpo Airport Aeropuerto de Fuerte Olimpo Tte. 1ro Inocencio Herebia
- IATA: OLK; ICAO: SGOL

Summary
- Airport type: Public
- Serves: Fuerte Olimpo, Paraguay
- Elevation AMSL: 280 ft / 85 m
- Coordinates: 21°02′45″S 57°53′00″W

Map
- Location of the airport in Paraguay

Runways
Direction	Length		Surface
Direction	m	ft	Surface
05/23	1,000	3,281	Concrete
- Sources: GCM Google Maps SkyVector

Tte. 1ro Inocencio Herebia Airport (IATA: OLK, ICAO: SGOL), or simply known as Fuerte Olimpo Airport, is an airport serving the Paraguay River port of Fuerte Olimpo in Alto Paraguay Department of Paraguay.

The runway was paved in 2016 and an apron added. There are large hills just southeast of the runway.

== See also ==
- List of airports in Paraguay
- Transport in Paraguay
