= Puerto Casado =

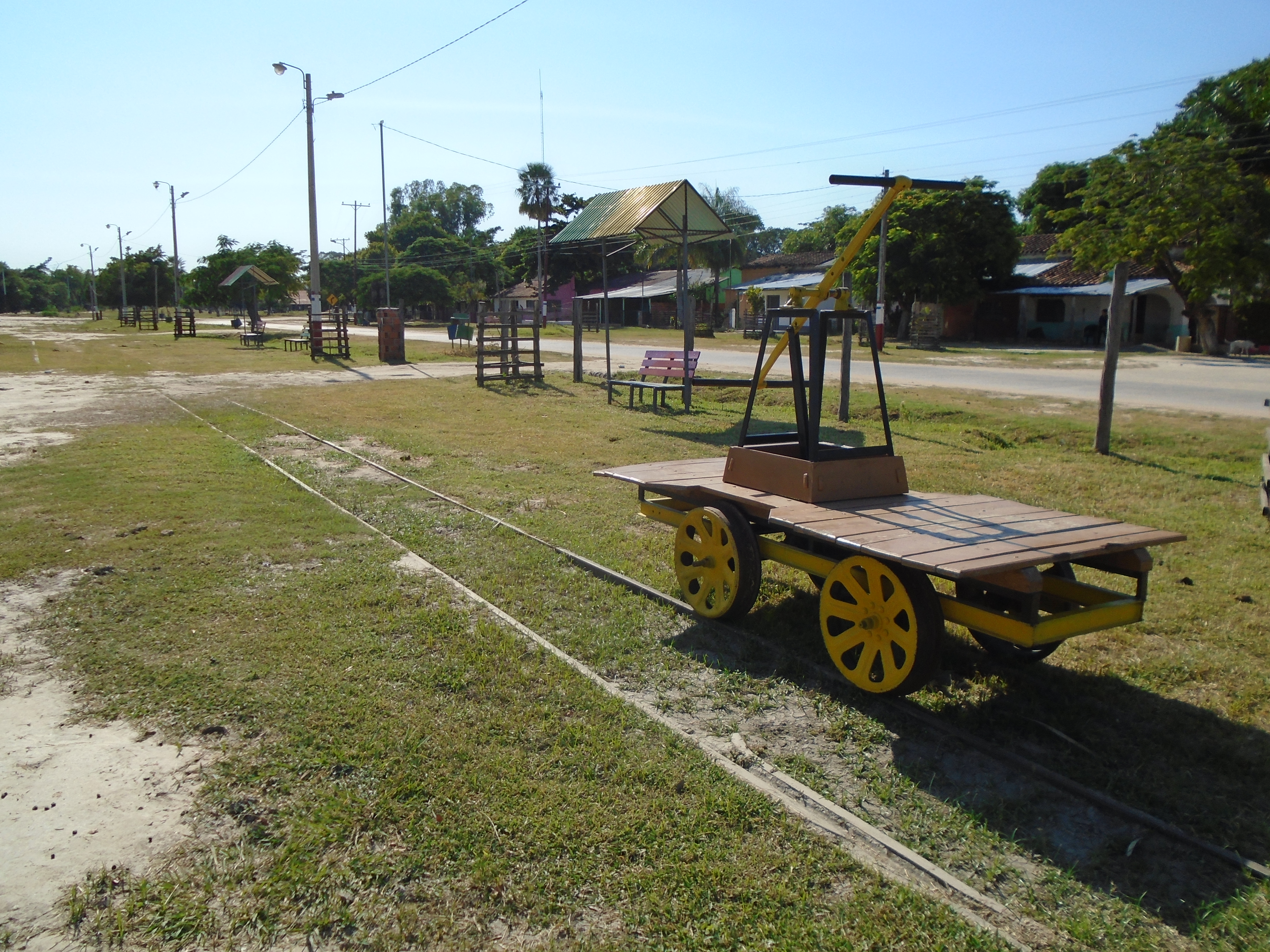

- Location within Paraguay
- Coordinates: 22°17′24″S 57°56′24″W
- Country: Paraguay
- Department: Alto Paraguay
- Founded: 1889, Carlos Casado

Government
  - Intendente Municipal: Judith Catalina Ferreira de Medina

Area
  - Total: 18.226 km^{2} (7.037 sq mi)
- Elevation: 65 m (213 ft)

Population (2022)
  - Total: 5,439
  - Density: 298.4/km^{2} (772.9/sq mi)
- Time zone: -3 Gmt
- Postal code: 9000
- Climate: Aw

Puerto Casado (formerly known as La Victoria) is one of the 4 districts in Alto Paraguay Department, Paraguay. It includes the town of La Victoria (also called Puerto La Victoria).

== History and tourism ==
Founded in 1889 in time of President Patricio Escobar, formerly known as Angel Custodio. It was based on Enterprise Taninera Carlos Casado, which is also called "Puerto Casado." Elevated by district in 1973.

This was used as a port of transit for Paraguayan troops on their way to fight the Bolivians during the Chaco War.

The Carlos Casado Company came to have more than 5,000,000 hectares in the Paraguayan Chaco; today the factory is shut down. It is from here that Mennonites and Paraguayan soldiers passed, using the narrow-gauge trains of the Chaco Central railroad that extended 145 km west from the River Paraguay. The first Mennonite settlers arrived here in 1926.

In Puerto Casado there are places of historical epoch of the Chaco War.

Galvan Hill is located 5 km south of "Kilometro 11," the former railway station that left from Puerto Casado. The boat makes a high Aquidabán here, part of Concepcion. Another boat that is here for the "Cacique II," which part of Asunción for Vallemí.

At Galvan Hill one can still see the old railroad tracks. Here Emiliano R. Fernández wrote his poem "The Fashion" in 1926. This is the first railroad station of importance along the railroad.

The railway was built by the company for the extraction of timber, with nearly 150 km of narrow gauge track into the heart of the Chaco. The same route of the railway was extended up to 160 km, which enabled the Paraguayan troops in campaign to access the fortresses to stop the advance of Bolivians in this vast territory during the Chaco War.

During the Chaco War of the railroad was vital to transport soldiers, arms, ammunition, supplies, vehicles, fuel, medicines and wounded.

The old Kilometro 11 station, a former house that was part of the old railway station of the Carlos Casado Company, is one of the historic landmarks still standing in the locality.

With the sale of public lands in the late nineteenth century was established company Carlos Casado Ltda., which acquired in 1886 over 7,800 square kilometres (3,000 sq mi), was devoted to logging and production of tannin. Tannin is a substance extracted from the "quebracho" tree, used for tanning hides. The son of the founder, José Casado, arrived in 1929 to manage the site, lived on site until 1945.

During the Chaco War, the facilities were used as workshops for all kinds of machinery, armaments, especially motor vehicles, before being sent into battle. It also was used as river port and military post.

In 1931 the Command Infantry Division was installed at the port, José Félix Estigarribia accepted the post of Commander that he proposed the then president Joseph P. Guggiari since late July, 1931 Estigarribia was already installed there. When the new commander settled in the place, the owner of the factory provided him with a house, called "La Chaqueña", a large and comfortable residence located in the city centre.

Emiliano R. Fernandez, popular poet and musician, often called the "northern poet," to 1923 was in Puerto Casado, where he performed several tasks. Often his works are signed as having been written in Alto Paraguay.

As for handicrafts, in the early 1980s a former worker of the company had the idea of making a guampa (mate cup) for his own use from pieces of the stainless steel that was used to store tannin. The idea was warmly accepted and began to receive orders and the manufacturer improved technology and creating new models of guampa for drinking mate and terere. Today these are manufactured in various designs on special orders for gifts or as souvenirs of Puerto Casado.

In the Paraguay and Apa Rivers and in the many streams in the area, an important tourist activity is fishing.

== Etymology ==
Puerto Casado is a company town founded by the Compañía Carlos Casado, established in the city of Rosario (Argentina). For many years, quebracho logs were processed into tannin here. In the late 1990s, the company ceased production and the tannin operation was closed down.

== Geography ==
The terrain is a plain that does not exceed 300 meters above sea level. There are sporadic and undulations of fertile land, used for agriculture and animal husbandry.

=== Climate ===
The climate is tropical, with a maximum of 45 degrees Celsius in summer, and a minimum of 9 degrees Celsius in winter. The average is 25 degrees. We present long drought followed by torrential rains. The climate of Puerto Casado can be classified as tropical savannah climate (Aw).

Climate data for Puerto Casado (1991-2020)
Month	Jan	Feb	Mar	Apr	May	Jun	Jul	Aug	Sep	Oct	Nov	Dec	Year
Record high °C (°F)	42.0 (107.6)	41.6 (106.9)	42.0 (107.6)	38.5 (101.3)	36.0 (96.8)	36.0 (96.8)	37.0 (98.6)	40.0 (104.0)	39.5 (103.1)	43.2 (109.8)	42.2 (108.0)	42.0 (107.6)	43.2 (109.8)
Mean daily maximum °C (°F)	34.6 (94.3)	33.8 (92.8)	33.4 (92.1)	31.4 (88.5)	27.5 (81.5)	26.5 (79.7)	26.6 (79.9)	29.4 (84.9)	31.7 (89.1)	33.4 (92.1)	33.4 (92.1)	33.9 (93.0)	31.3 (88.3)
Daily mean °C (°F)	28.4 (83.1)	27.7 (81.9)	27.0 (80.6)	24.9 (76.8)	21.2 (70.2)	20.2 (68.4)	19.4 (66.9)	21.6 (70.9)	24.1 (75.4)	26.5 (79.7)	26.9 (80.4)	27.9 (82.2)	24.7 (76.5)
Mean daily minimum °C (°F)	23.9 (75.0)	23.6 (74.5)	22.7 (72.9)	20.3 (68.5)	16.7 (62.1)	15.7 (60.3)	14.2 (57.6)	15.8 (60.4)	18.4 (65.1)	21.5 (70.7)	22.0 (71.6)	23.4 (74.1)	19.9 (67.8)
Record low °C (°F)	13.0 (55.4)	12.8 (55.0)	9.5 (49.1)	5.6 (42.1)	3.0 (37.4)	1.2 (34.2)	−0.4 (31.3)	−0.1 (31.8)	3.0 (37.4)	7.8 (46.0)	11.0 (51.8)	7.4 (45.3)	−0.4 (31.3)
Average precipitation mm (inches)	161.1 (6.34)	156.2 (6.15)	137.5 (5.41)	122.9 (4.84)	118.5 (4.67)	60.4 (2.38)	36.6 (1.44)	31.7 (1.25)	66.1 (2.60)	140.3 (5.52)	206.7 (8.14)	186.1 (7.33)	1,424.2 (56.07)
Average precipitation days (≥ 0.1 mm)	10	8	8	7	6	6	4	5	6	8	8	9	85
Average relative humidity (%)	72	73	74	75	77	76	69	66	64	66	67	69	71
Source: NOAA (precipitation days, humidity 1961-1990) Ogimet

== Demography ==
La Victoria has a total of 6,489 inhabitants, of whom 3304 are men and 3185 women, according to estimates by the Directorate General of Statistics, Census and Surveys.

== Economy ==
Its main business is animal husbandry. Previously the company was located here taninera Carlos Casado Ltda.

One of the largest companies in the country was the company Carlos Casado, former factory tannin, about the company looks at the homes of former employees and owners, as well as the old Hotel de Puerto Casado.

== Pilgrimage "Ñanda Yvyrekávo" ==
In search of our land, Guarani, with whom he traveled nearly 600 km from Puerto Casado to Asunción, 156 km for six days on foot and the rest by truck. The villagers say it is the longest in the social struggle in the country. They call on the government to expropriate the property sold by the Casado Company to Moon Sect, which includes the district.

== Transportation ==
The town can be reached by Transchaco Highway (National Route N° 9), to the junction of the Pioneers, located 409 km from Asunción, then an unpaved road to Puerto Casado, about 230 km east, this is the Amalia Route.

In Puerto Casado there is a landing strip for aircraft, La Victoria Airport, and one can also get to Puerto Casado by riverboat.

== Sources ==
Fretz, Joseph W. Pilgrims in Paraguay: The Story of Mennonite Colonization in South America. Scottdate: Herald Press, 1953. Pp. 12-26.

- – World-Gazetteer.com
- Geography Illustrated Paraguay, Distributed Arami SRL, 2007. ISBN 99925-68-04-6
- Geography of Paraguay, First Edition 1999, Publisher Hispanic Paraguay SRL
