= Rufino Galvão, Viscount of Maracaju =

Brazilian politician (1831–1909)

Viscount of Maracaju
- Galvão in 1875

Justice of the Superior Military Court
- In office 22 July 1893 – 18 February 1909
- President: Floriano Peixoto

Minister of War
- In office 7 June 1889 – 9 September 1889
- Preceded by: Tomás José Coelho de Almeida
- Succeeded by: Benjamin Constant

President of Pará
- In office 16 December 1882 – 21 February 1884
- Monarch: Pedro II
- Preceded by: João Rodrigues Chaves
- Succeeded by: José de Araujo Roso Danin

President of Mato Grosso
- In office 5 December 1879 – 2 May 1881
- Monarch: Pedro II
- Preceded by: João José Pedrosa
- Succeeded by: José Leite Galvão

President of Amazonas
- In office 7 March 1878 – 15 November 1879
- Monarch: Pedro II
- Preceded by: Agesilão Pereira da Silva
- Succeeded by: José Clarindo de Queirós

Personal details
- Born: 2 July 1831 Laranjeiras, Sergipe, Brazil
- Died: 18 February 1909 (aged 77) Rio de Janeiro, Brazil

Military service
- Allegiance: Empire of Brazil; First Brazilian Republic
- Branch: Imperial Brazilian Army; Brazilian Army
- Years of service: 1851–1909
- Rank: Marshal
- Battles/wars: Platine War; Paraguayan War; Battle of Apa River
- Coat of Arms of the Viscount of Maracaju

Rufino Eneias Gustavo Galvão, Viscount of Maracaju (2 July 1831 – 18 February 1909) was a Brazilian military officer and politician who fought in the Paraguayan War, served as Provincial President of three different Brazilian provinces, as the Minister of War of Brazil and as a member of the Superior Military Court of Brazil.

As a military officer, he participated in the battles of Ytororó and Avay, he was the Chief of the Engineering Commission which after the Paraguayan War marked the new border with Paraguay, where serving with distinction, he earned the title of Baron of Maracaju. His highest achieved rank was that of Marshal, however as he was demoted in the Proclamation of the Republic he died in the rank of Lieutenant-General.

As a politician, he was president of the Province of Amazonas (7 March 1879 – 27 August 1879), president of the Province of Mato Grosso (5 December 1879 – 2 May 1881), president of the Province of Pará (16 December 1882 – 11 May 1883), minister of war in three different periods (7 June 1889 – 2 September 1889; 1 October 1889 – 17 October 1889; 12 November 1889 – 15 November 1889), and after the Proclamation of the Republic, minister of the Superior Military Court.

== Biography ==
Galvão was the son of José Antônio da Fonseca Galvão and Mariana Clementina de Vasconcelos Galvão, brother of Antônio Eneas Gustavo Galvão, baron of Rio Apa, and judge Manuel do Nascimento da Fonseca Galvão.

He was governor of the provinces of Amazonas, named by imperial letter of January 19, 1878, from 7 March 1878 to 26 August 1879, from Mato Grosso and Pará from 16 of December 1882 the 1884, and Minister of War in 1889, having commanded the delimitation of the border between Brazil and Paraguay. He was also a minister of the Superior Military Court.
