= Pilar, Paraguay =

Pilar
- City
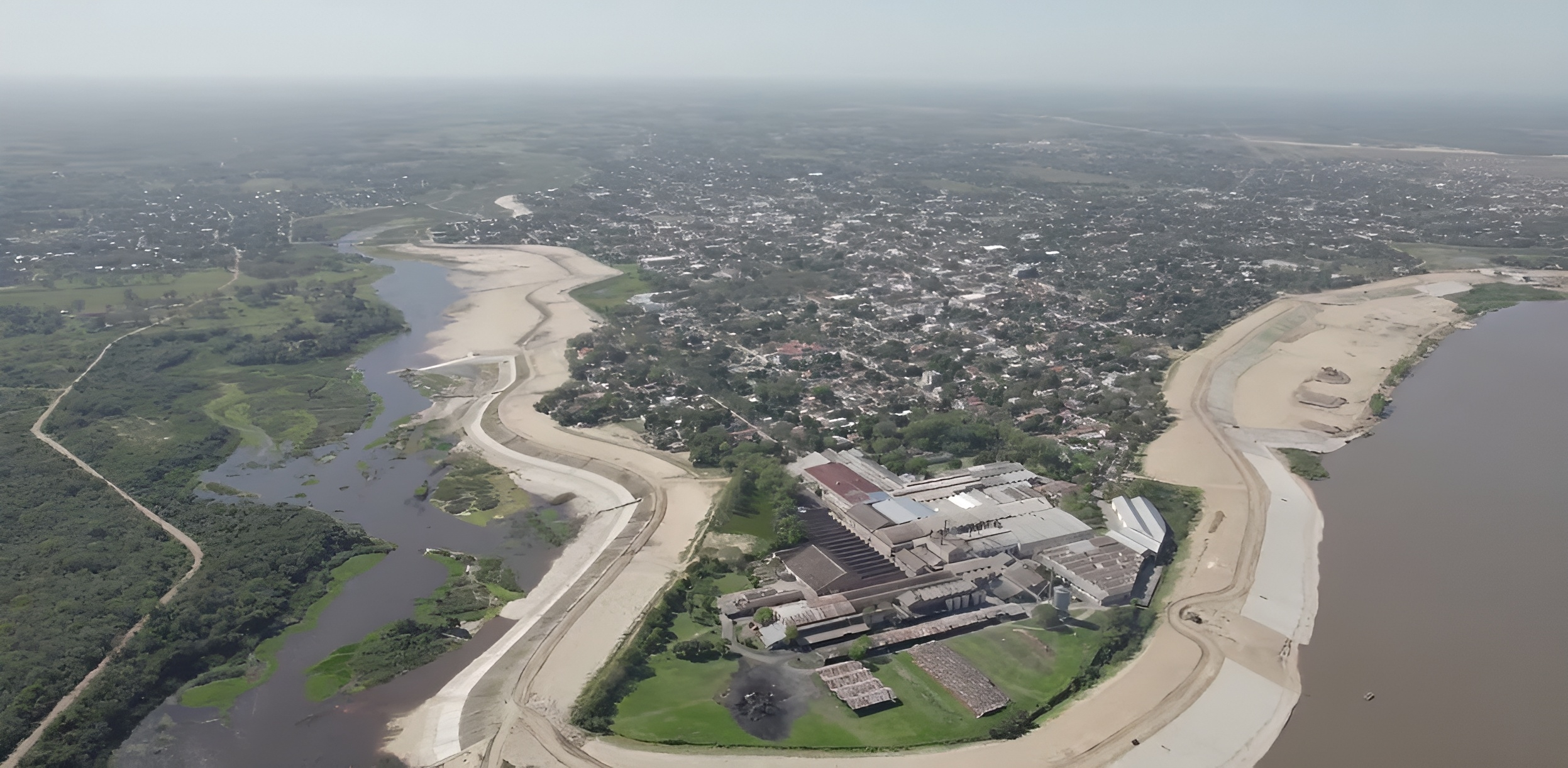
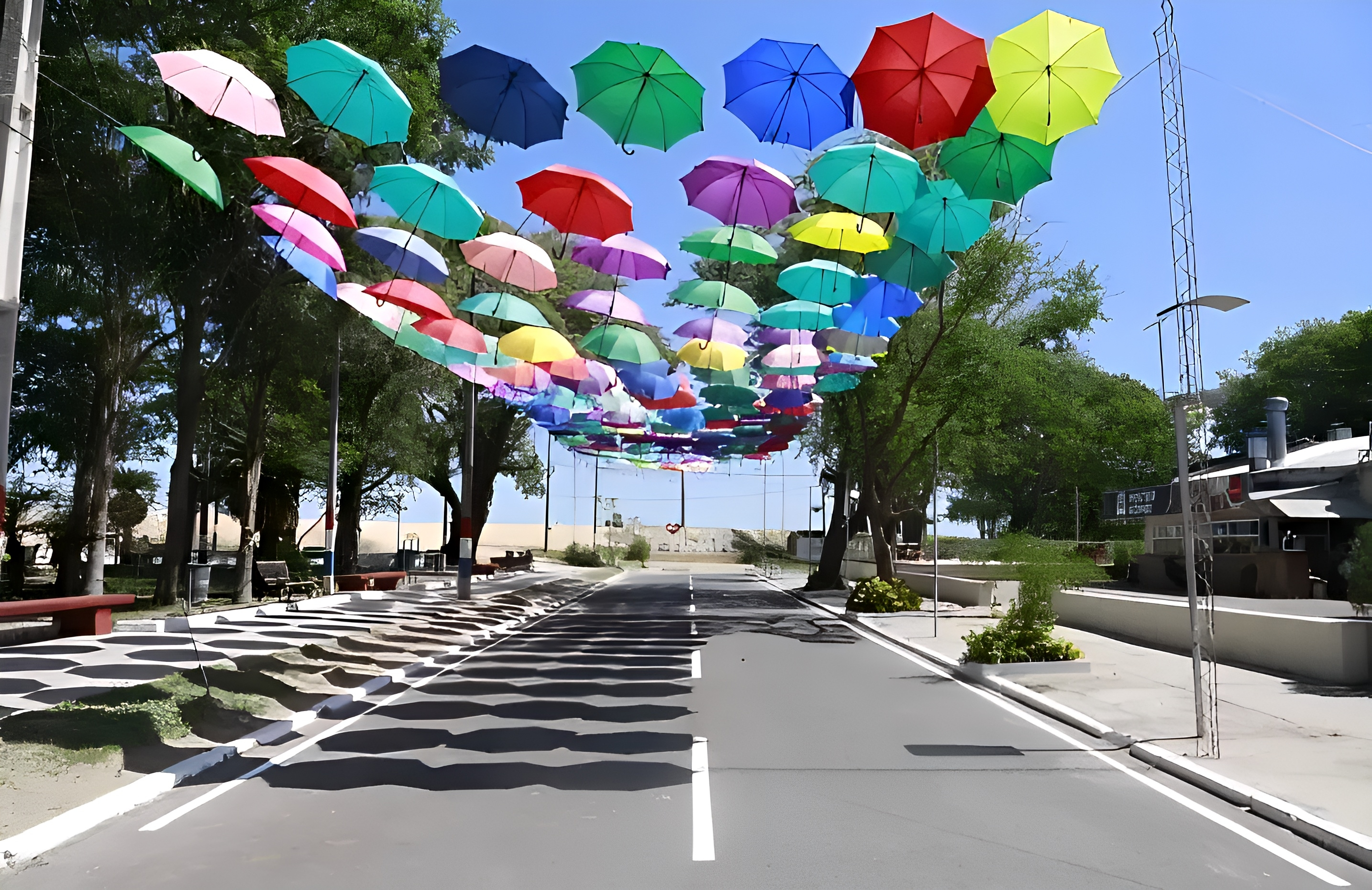
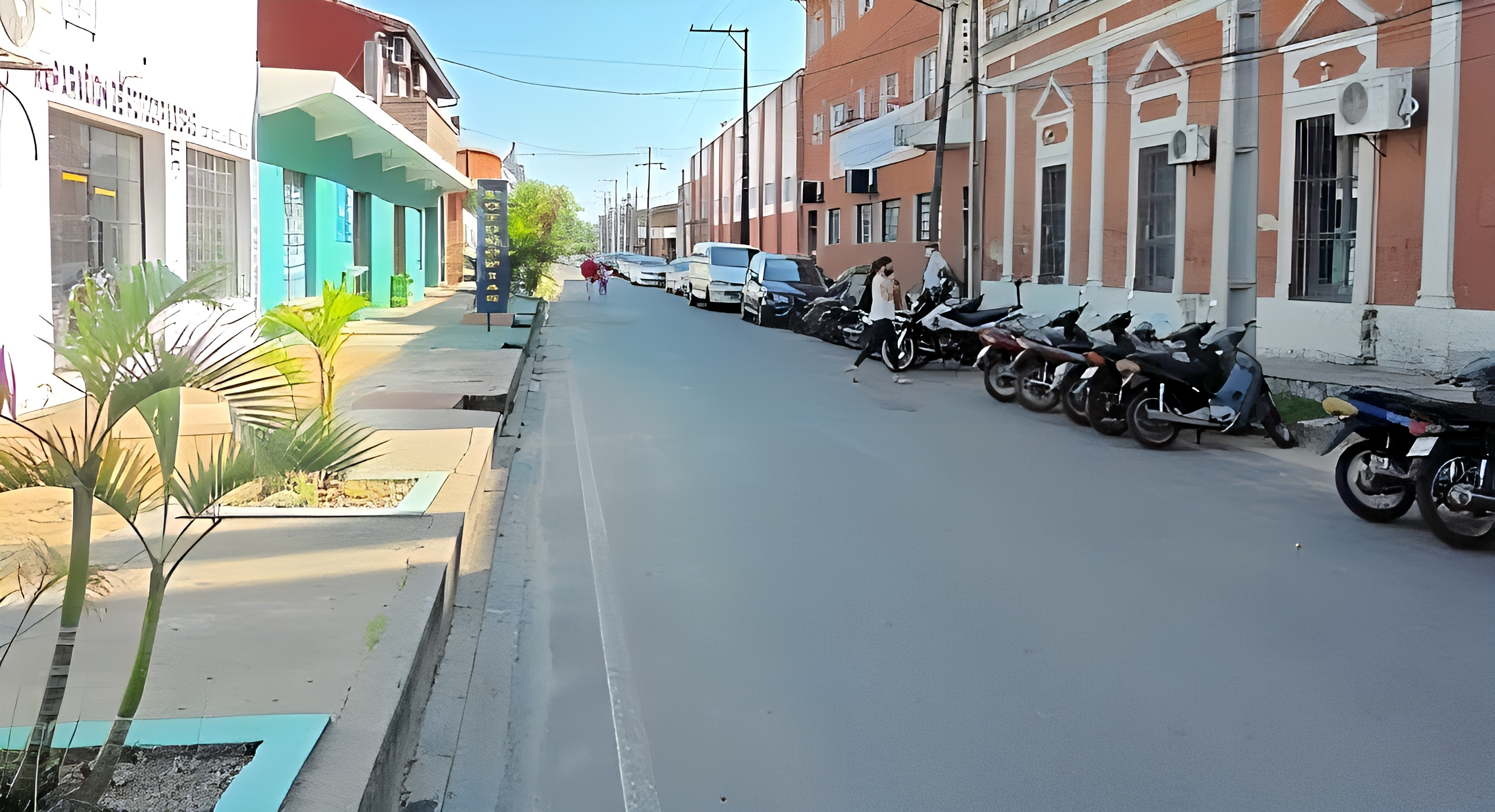
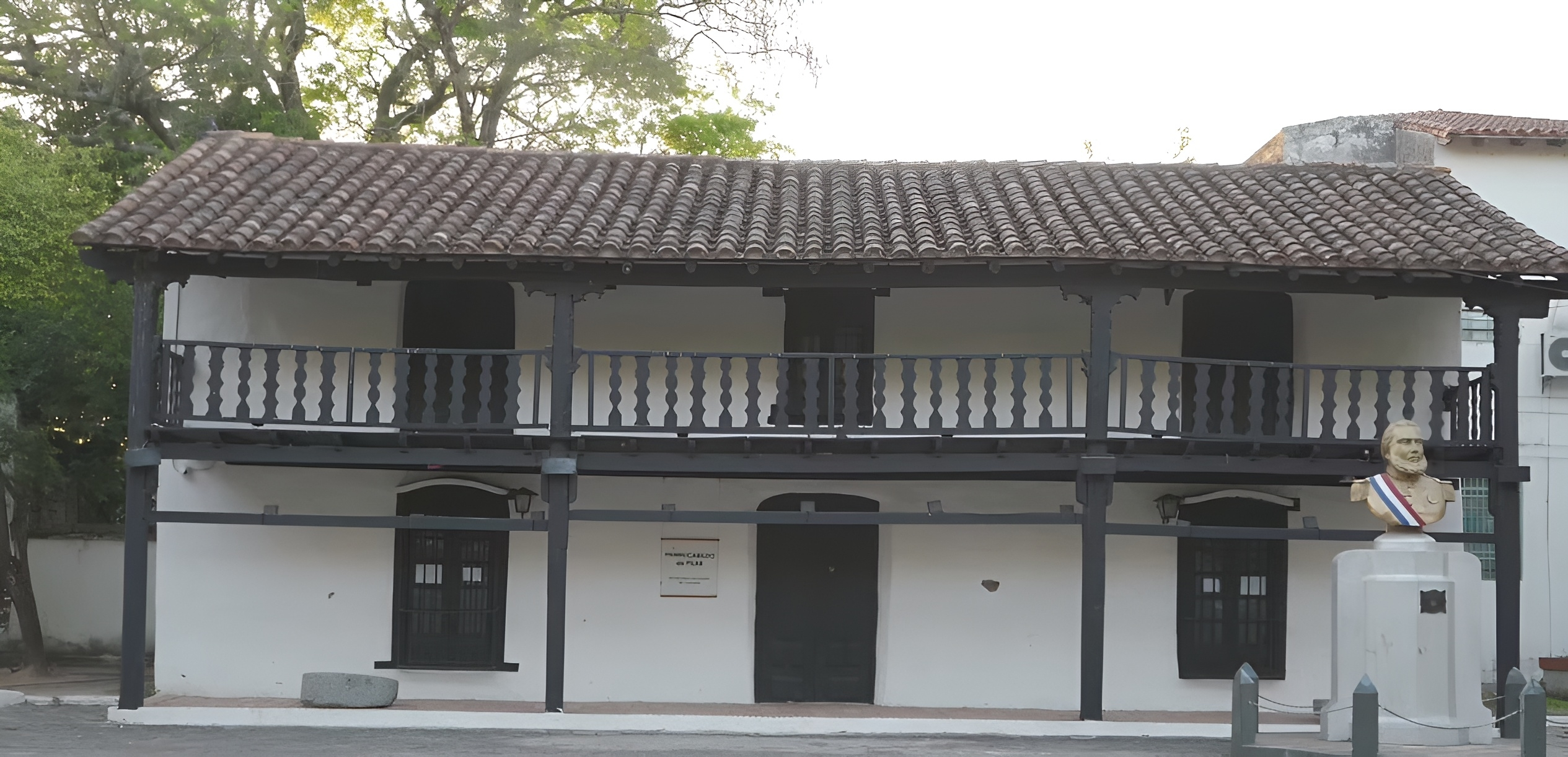
- Clockwise from the top: The city view of Pilar, the Local government of Pilar, Cabildo of Pilar, Downtown Pilar and the Pilar umbrellas at the city center

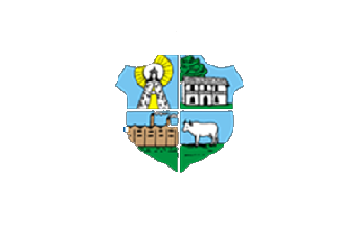
- Flag

- Location within Paraguay
- Coordinates: 26°52′12″S 58°18′0″W
- Country: Paraguay
- Department: Ñeembucú
- Foundation: October 12, 1779

Government
  - Intendente Municipal: Fernando Luis Ramírez González

Area
  - Total: 1,130 km^{2} (440 sq mi)

Population (2019)
  - Total: 32,810
  - Density: 29.0/km^{2} (75.2/sq mi)
- Time zone: UTC-04 (AST)
  - Summer (DST): UTC-03 (ADT)
- Postal code: 2800
- Area code: +595 (786)

Pilar (Spanish pronunciation: [piˈlaɾ]) is the capital city of the Paraguayan department of Ñeembucú, located along the Paraguay River in the southwestern part of the country. Located about 258 km (160 mi) from Asunción, Pilar serves as an important center of commerce and government for the far southwestern region of the country.

== Etymology ==
Pilar was founded by order of the governor-intendant Pedro Melo de Portugal on October 12, 1779 by settlers from Asunción with the name of Villa del Ñeembucú. Four years later it was called Villa del Pilar, a name owed to the Spanish priest Marcial Antonio Uliambre, originally from Zaragoza, where the Virgin of Pillar is venerated. Its foundation had fundamental strategic purposes, since it served as a troop station to oversee traffic in the Paraguay River. According to a census in 1783, its population was 2,355 inhabitants.

== History ==
During the events that led to the Independence of Paraguay, Captain Blás José Roxas de Aranda was in Pilar with a contingent of men to prevent the governor-intendant Bernardo de Velasco from escaping from the province by ship. After independence, during Gaspar Rodríguez de Francia's dictatorship, the Port of Pilar was the only one authorized in all of Paraguay for foreign trade, mainly the sale of yerba mate.

During the Paraguayan War, two battles took place in then Villa del Pilar, the Battle of Pilar on September 20, 1867, between superior Brazilian forces and a small Paraguayan garrison, later reinforced by Solano López' personal guard under Felipe Toledo; and a skirmish on October 27 of the same year, in the middle of the town, which led to its occupation by Brazilian forces. Years after the war, when the Brazilians left the country in 1876, the bell tower of the current Minor Basilica of Nuestra Señora del Pilar rang its bells for several hours, in order to mark this historical fact.

On January 25, 1908, the town was elevated from Villa to city of Pilar. In 1930 Paolo Federico Alberzoni built a textile complex, the current Manufactura de Pilar SA. Later he expanded his plant to provide electricity to the city. In the Paraguayan civil war of 1947, Pilar and Concepción were the two largest cities to fall to the rebels. For many years, until the government of Alfredo Stroessner, the Port of Pilar was the most important in the south, and an entry port to the country.

In 1983 a flood occurred that left practically the entire city under water. To protect it from future floods, the city has a system of retaining walls, locks and pumping plants. The walls make up the Costanera de Pilar. In 2000, the paving of Route 4, was completed; since then the city was no longer isolated from the country due to rain. Route 19, which connects Pilar to Villeta, is also paved.

The Paraguayan Army's Cavalry Regiment No. 2, Colonel Felipe Toledo (RC2), is based in the city.

== Geography ==
=== Hydrography ===
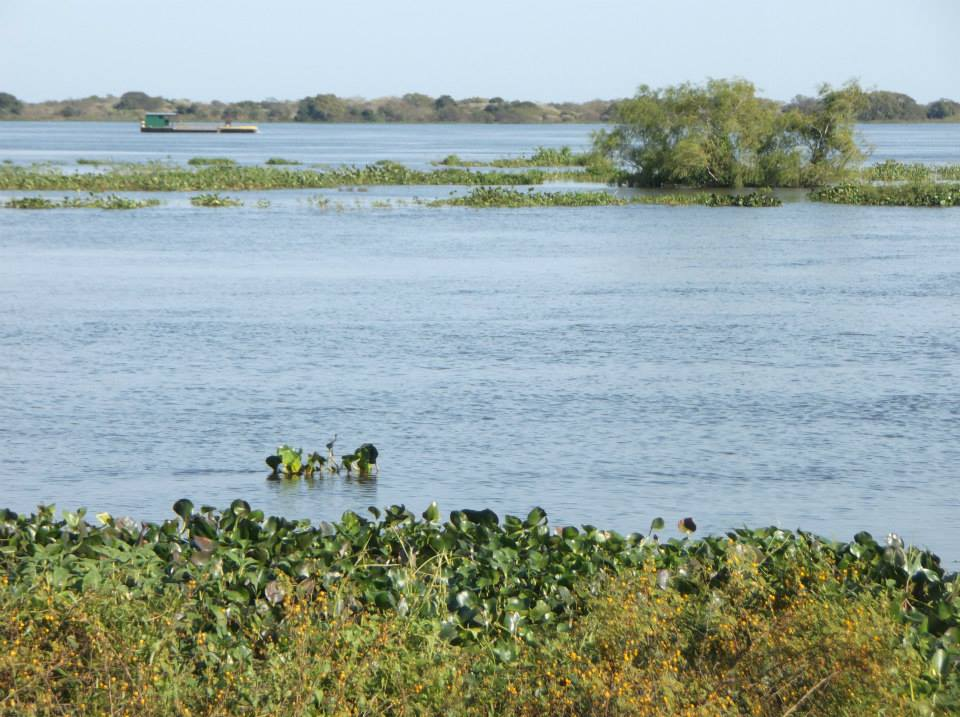
Ñeembucú stream, as it passes through the city of Pilar.

In addition to the Ñeembucú, other streams adjacent to Pilar are the San Lorenzo and the Montuoso. The hydrography of the area offers landscapes around the city of Pilar, with optimal opportunities for fishing and spas. The Ñeembucú stream divides the city in two, the oldest and most populated part being the one on its left bank, joining the city by the Ñeembucú Bridge. It has countless old houses and several squares, most of them in the city center. Across the river from the city is Colonia Cano (Argentina), and, a few kilometers downstream, the mouth of the Bermejo River.

=== Climate ===
Situated near the confluence of the Paraguay and Paraná rivers, Pilar is in a region of the country with many small streams, rivers and wetlands that contribute to a humid climate. The average annual temperature is 22 °C (72 °F). Summer temperatures can reach as high as 40 °C (104 °F), and it winter as low as −3 °C (27 °F). The rainy months are January, March, April and October; the dryer are May and August. The Köppen Climate Classification subtype for this climate is "Cfa" (Humid Subtropical Climate).

Climate data for Pilar (1991-2020, extremes-present)
| Month | Jan | Feb | Mar | Apr | May | Jun | Jul | Aug | Sep | Oct | Nov | Dec | Year |
|---|---|---|---|---|---|---|---|---|---|---|---|---|---|
| Record high °C (°F) | 42.4 (108.3) | 40.5 (104.9) | 41.4 (106.5) | 37.0 (98.6) | 34.4 (93.9) | 33.5 (92.3) | 35.0 (95.0) | 38.4 (101.1) | 42.5 (108.5) | 43.5 (110.3) | 42.5 (108.5) | 42.0 (107.6) | 43.5 (110.3) |
| Mean daily maximum °C (°F) | 33.4 (92.1) | 32.4 (90.3) | 31.1 (88.0) | 28.0 (82.4) | 24.1 (75.4) | 22.3 (72.1) | 22.0 (71.6) | 24.5 (76.1) | 26.4 (79.5) | 28.7 (83.7) | 30.2 (86.4) | 32.5 (90.5) | 28.0 (82.4) |
| Daily mean °C (°F) | 27.1 (80.8) | 26.2 (79.2) | 24.8 (76.6) | 21.9 (71.4) | 18.2 (64.8) | 16.5 (61.7) | 15.5 (59.9) | 17.3 (63.1) | 19.3 (66.7) | 22.3 (72.1) | 24.0 (75.2) | 26.2 (79.2) | 21.6 (70.9) |
| Mean daily minimum °C (°F) | 22.2 (72.0) | 21.8 (71.2) | 20.2 (68.4) | 17.5 (63.5) | 14.0 (57.2) | 12.2 (54.0) | 10.6 (51.1) | 11.9 (53.4) | 13.8 (56.8) | 17.4 (63.3) | 18.8 (65.8) | 21.1 (70.0) | 16.8 (62.2) |
| Record low °C (°F) | 12.5 (54.5) | 11.0 (51.8) | 8.5 (47.3) | 7.7 (45.9) | −0.8 (30.6) | 0.0 (32.0) | −1.8 (28.8) | −0.8 (30.6) | 0.0 (32.0) | 7.0 (44.6) | 6.4 (43.5) | 9.8 (49.6) | −1.8 (28.8) |
| Average precipitation mm (inches) | 173.5 (6.83) | 131.8 (5.19) | 144.1 (5.67) | 172.2 (6.78) | 110.0 (4.33) | 62.3 (2.45) | 46.2 (1.82) | 37.1 (1.46) | 72.2 (2.84) | 187.3 (7.37) | 162.9 (6.41) | 159.2 (6.27) | 1,458.9 (57.44) |
| Average precipitation days (≥ 0.1 mm) | 9 | 8 | 9 | 8 | 6 | 6 | 5 | 6 | 7 | 9 | 9 | 8 | 90 |
| Average relative humidity (%) | 69 | 72 | 75 | 78 | 79 | 79 | 76 | 74 | 71 | 69 | 69 | 67 | 73 |
Source: NOAA (extremes, precipitation days, humidity 1961-1990)

== Demographics ==
Pilar has 34,741 inhabitants in total, according to official data from the 2022 Paraguayan census. This Paraguayan city is home to a notable community of descendants of Italians.

Pilar has a total population of 32,810, with 14,298 men and 15,030 women, according to information provided by the General Directorate of Statistics, Polls and Censuses.

== Government ==
The municipal government is in charge of the municipal administration and the municipal board, as established in article 20 of the Municipal Organic Law (LOM). The Municipality is led by the mayor and the different administrative agencies of the municipality. The mayor has responsibility for the general management of the district and is directly elected by the citizens for a period of 5 years. As for the councilors, who are part of the Municipal Board, they serve for 5 years, with the possibility of re-election, and their role is limited to acting as a deliberative and legislative body of the local government. In accordance with article 24 of the aforementioned law, the number of councilors of each municipality is determined according to the budget assigned by the State to the respective jurisdiction.

The management of the city is carried out by the municipality, which operates under a structure similar to that of the national government: the mayor is the main representative of the executive branch, while the Municipal Board acts as a legislative and regulatory body. The latter has the responsibility of developing and approving laws or ordinances, which are local regulations whose application is mandatory within the limits of the municipality.

=== Mayors of Pilar ===
In 1824, by decree of the government of Gaspar Rodríguez de Francia, all councils were abolished and the city was governed by a delegate; After Francia died, the towns were governed by the so-called municipal bodies, which also administered justice.

After the War of the Triple Alliance, the residents of Pilar organized themselves again, as at the beginning, forming the neighborhood council which they called the “administrative economic council”, made official and named on July 5, 1872. The first meeting was formed on July 19, 1872 and was chaired by Lorenzo Jiménez until 1874. Successive government decrees appointed those who would head the board:

| Year | Name | Duration |
| 1874 | José del Rosario Brítez | 1 year |
| 1875 | Martin Blanco | 1 year |
| 1876 | Martin Blanco | 3 years |
| 1879 | José de la Cruz Gómez | 1 year |
| 1880 | Inocencio Cabrera | 3 years |
| 1883 | Ignacio Granada | 1 year |

In 1884 the people elected their municipal authorities, by casting their votes, and elected Antonio dos Santos as head of the board for 3 years. In 1887, the second municipal election was held; curiously, it resulted in a tie, leading to a judicial solution and the board being given to Inocencio Talavera for 4 years.

| Year | Duration | Name |
| 1891 | 2 years | Pedro J. Vargas |
| 1893 | 1 year | Fortuoso Piola |
| 1894 | 2 years | Jose M. Delfino |
| 1896 | 3 years | Fermin Silva |
| 1899 | 1 year | Maximo Medina |
| 1900 | 2 years | Prospero Azzarini |
| 1902 | 1 year | Augusto Decoud |
| 1903 | 2 years | Miguel Trinidad |
| 1905 | 2 years | Demetrio Cartes |
| 1907 | 1 year | Maximo Medina |
| 1908 | 1 year | Ramón Díaz González |
| 1909 | 1 year | Eloy dos Santos |
| 1910 | 1 year | Jose Guglielnetti |
| 1910 | 7 months | José Lázaro Albera |
| 1911 | 1 year | Alfonso Dos Santos |
| 1912 | 5 years | Domiciano Albera |
| 1917 | 3 years | José Lázaro Albera |
| 1920 | 9 years | Alfonso Dos Santos |
| 1929 | 3 years | Sixto Ríos |
| 1932 | 3 years | Pila De Valoriani |
| 1935 | 1 year | Serviliano Alonso Peralta |
| 1936 | 1 year | Liborio Paredes |
| | | Pila De Valoriani |
| | | Luciano Zayas |
| 1937 | 1 years | Manuel Muñoz González |
| 1938 | 2 years | Serviliano Alonso Peralta |
| 1940 | 1 year | Santiago Bértoli |
| 1941 | 7 years | Alberto Fernández |
| 1948 | >1 year | Aurelio dos Santos |
| 1948 | 1 years | Alberto Dávalos |
| 1949 | 11 years | Carlino Báez |
| 1960 | 7 years | Vicente Souto Hernández |
| 1967 | 7 years | Rubén Ortíz Valenzuela |
| 1974 | 14 years | Fabio Insfrán Ruiz Diaz |
| 1988 | 1 year | Héctor Bottino Franco |
| 1989 | >1 year | Fidel Zenteno |
| 1989 | >1 year | Julio César Lugo |
| 1991 | 5 year | Víctor Hermógenes Encina Silva |
| 1996 | 5 years | Tomás Saturnino Montiel Palacios |
| 2002 | 4 years | Darío Rubén Encina Silva |
| 2006 | 3 years 8 months | Carlos Francisco Silva Medina |
| 2010 | 4 months | Cristobal Alfredo Stete Ghiringhelli |
| 2011 | 5 years | Luis Federico Benítez Cuevas |
| 2015 | 6 years | Cristóbal Alfredo Stete Ghiringhelli |
| 2021 | 5 years | Fernando Luis Ramírez González |

== Populated places ==
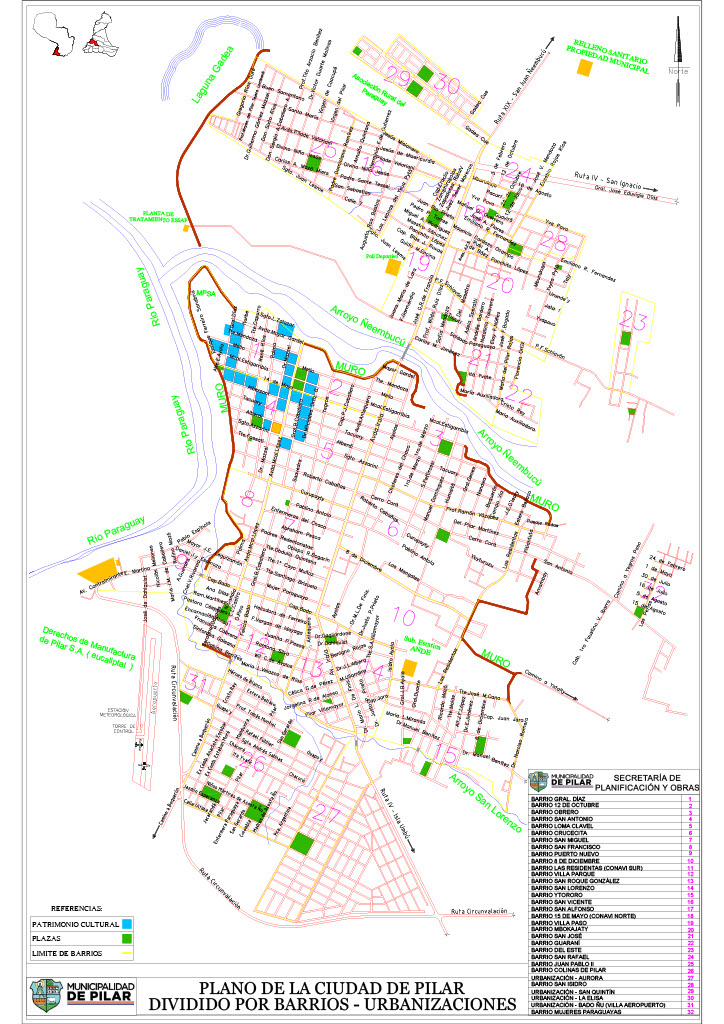
Map - Pilar neighborhoods (2025)

=== Neighborhoods ===
The urban area of Pilar is divided into a total of 32 neighborhoods.

Pilar neighborhoods
| 1 - Gral. Díaz | 17 - San Alfonso |
| 2 - October 12 | 18 - 15 de Mayo (Conavi Norte) |
| 3 - Trabajadores | 19 - Villa Paso |
| 4 - San Antonio | 20 - Mbokajaty |
| 5 - Loma Clavel | 21 - San José |
| 6 - Crucecita | 22 - Guarani |
| 7 - San Miguel | 23 - Eastern District |
| 8 - San Francisco | 24 - San Rafael |
| 9 - Puerto Nuvo | 25 - John Paul II |
| 10 - December 8 | 26 - Colinas del Pilar |
| 11 - Las Residentas (Conavi Sur) | 27 - Aurora |
| 12 - Villa Parque | 28 - San Isidro |
| 13 - San Roque González | 29 - San Quintín |
| 14 - San Lorenzo | 30 - La Elisa |
| 15 - Ytororo | 31 - Bado Ñu |
| 16 - San Vicente | 32 - Mujer paraguaya |
33 - 21 de septiembre

=== Localities ===
The rural area of Pilar is divided into six areas.

Pilar companies
1 - Primera de Yataity
2 - Segunda de Yataity
3 - Tercera de Yataity
4 - Cambacua
5 - Vale Apu´a
6 - Medina

== Economy ==
Pilar is a commercial and industrial city, and it also has some tourism. The city's residents are mainly dedicated to commerce, fishing, dairy production (bovine and goat), and horticulture. There are also some dairy factories in the city.

== Tourism ==
The center of the city is home to a large number of historical buildings dating back to its foundation.

The Basilica of Our Lady of Pilar, whose feast day is celebrated on October 12, was constructed by Italian missionaries to the city. During Semana Santa the city is the site of a large fishing tournament that attracts participants and spectators from all over Paraguay and Northern Argentina.

The city's location on the Paraguay River provides a prime location for boating and fishing. There are walking paths, pavilions, and parks located on the shores of the river. The shores of the calmer Ñeembucú stream provide the city's residents with a beach to enjoy on hot December days.

The Town Council Museum was constructed in 1817, during the government of President Gaspar Rodríguez de Francia. It is excellently preserved. This is the only build of this nature that is still preserved in the country. The museum contains objects of historical importance including photographs, trophies and medals that belonged to the Marshall López, as well as pieces of columns from the old church, weapons, bullets, ammunitions, chains, lances, shields and other historical artifacts.

A very popular tourist destination is also the "Fiesta Hawaiana" Party every January 2. In recent years, this party which is held alongside the Ñeembucú stream has reached about 20,000 to 30,000 people coming from all parts of Paraguay, Argentina and Uruguay.

== Infrastructure ==
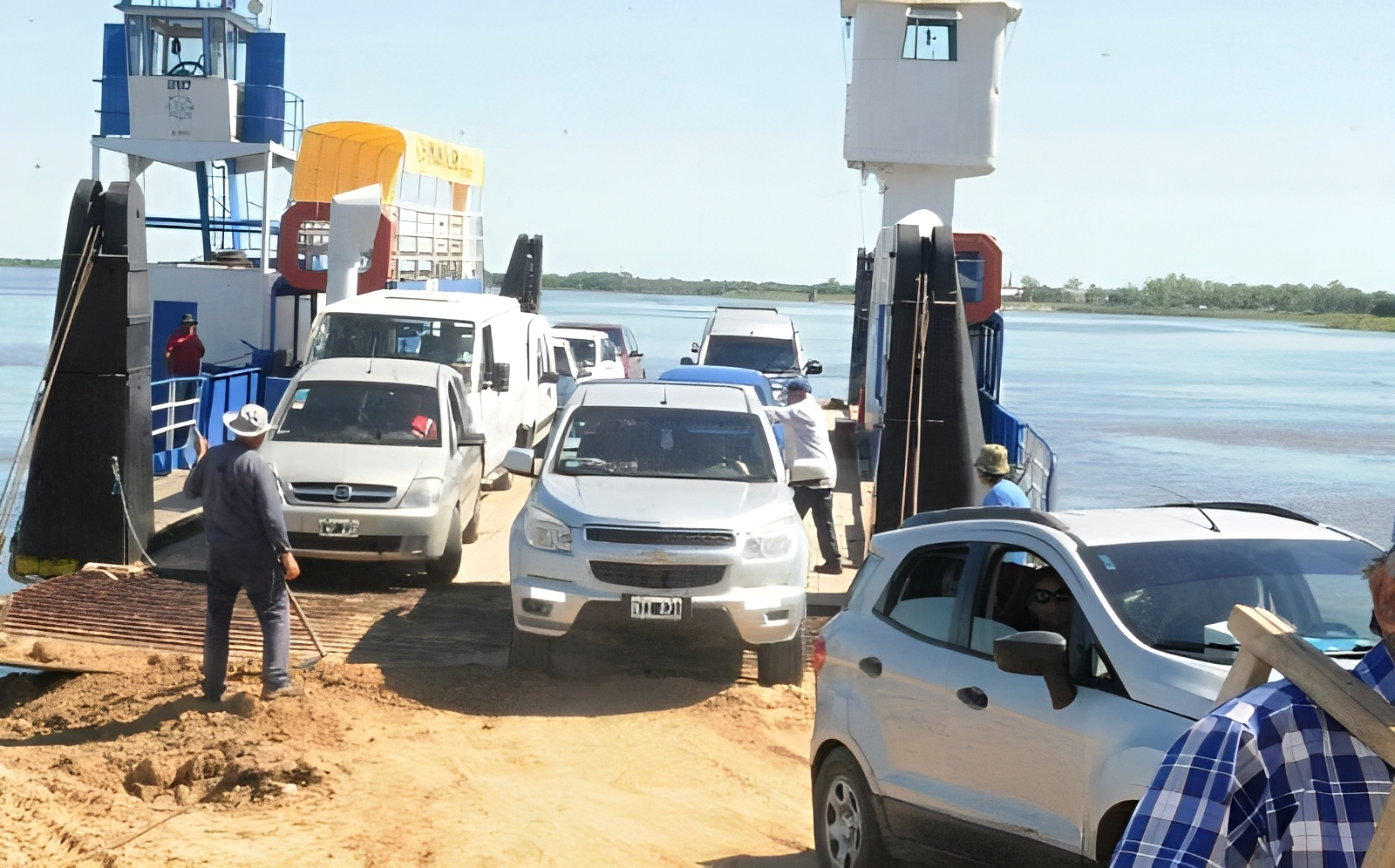
The ferryboat connecting Pilar to Puerto Cano, Argentina–Paraguay border

Pilar is served by Carlos Miguel Jiménez Airport, however traffic is limited to private airplanes. Located at the Argentina–Paraguay border, a ferry connects the city to Colonia Cano, which is close to Resistencia and Formosa in Argentina. Route 4 is a paved highway 140 km long that starts at San Ignacio. Pilar also may be reached through the new Villeta–Alberdi–Pilar Route, that goes all the way to Humaitá.

Within the city, motorcycles and mopeds make up the bulk of traffic, with bicycles also constituting a significant percentage of it. In addition, it is quite possible to find people on horseback, in horse-drawn carts, on foot, and in cars or trucks on the same street.

In December 2022, the Presidents Alberto Fernández of Argentina and Mario Abdo Benítez of Paraguay announced the construction of a bridge over the Paraguay River, which will directly connect the city of Pilar with Colonia Cano, Argentina. This project will be carried out in the coming years and will greatly benefit the residents of this region.

== Sports ==
Several sports are played in Pilar, the most popular being basketball and soccer.

There is at least one basketball court in each educational institution, being the most successful sport in Pilar, both for men and women. At the national level, the Pilar National Team is one of the best teams in the country, its staunchest rival being the Encarnación National Team, and lately that of San Lorenzo. There are two main venues for the disputes of this sport, that of the 1º de Mayo Club, and that of the Municipal Sports Center. It has its own League (Pilarense Basketball Association).

Soccer is also widely practiced in the city, having its own league and three appropriate venues for the dispute of said matches, that of Club Cap. Bado, America, and Díaz. At the women's level, this sport has had its greatest laurels, being national champion. The women's team of Col. Téc. Juan XXIII FROSEP has been national and international champion of the Coca-Cola Cup. Indoor soccer, paddle tennis, tennis, swimming, volleyball, etc. are also practiced in the city.

== Gallery ==
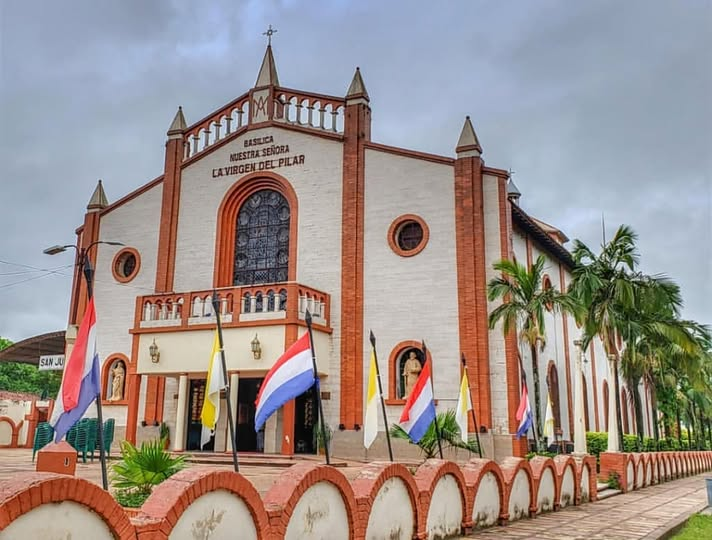
The Pilar Cathedral, Paraguay

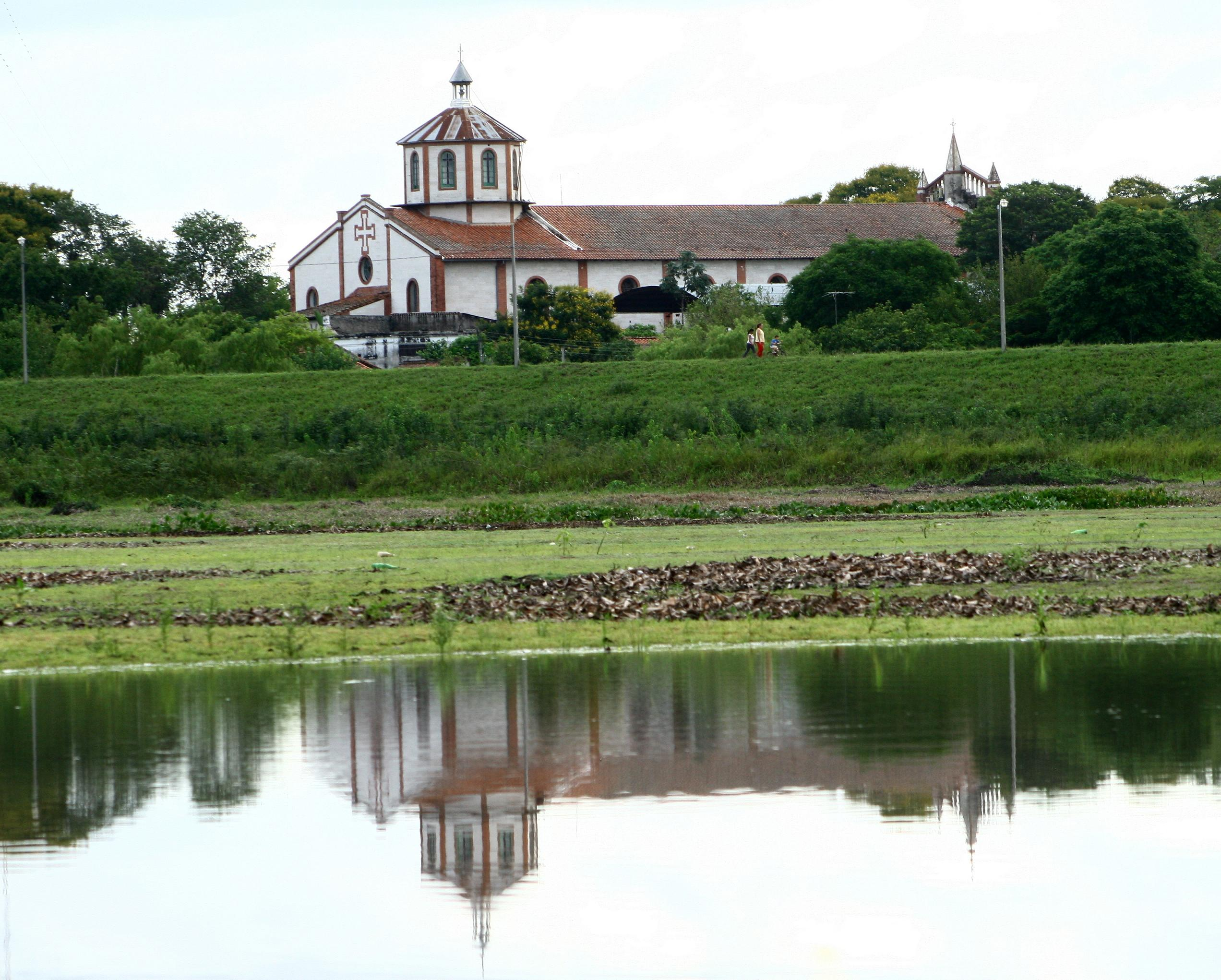
The Pilar Cathedral, Paraguay

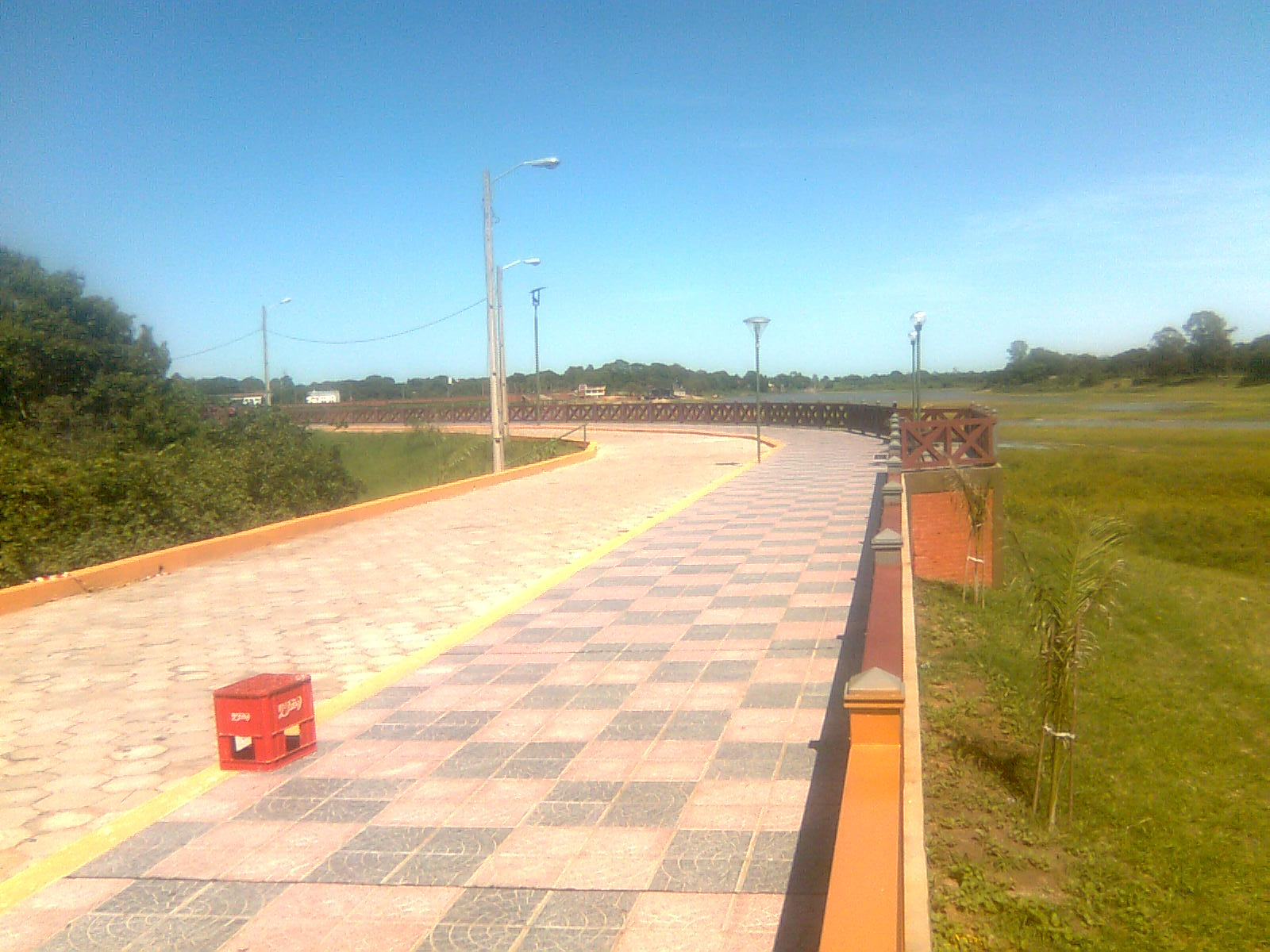
Coastal Avenue, Pilar, Paraguay

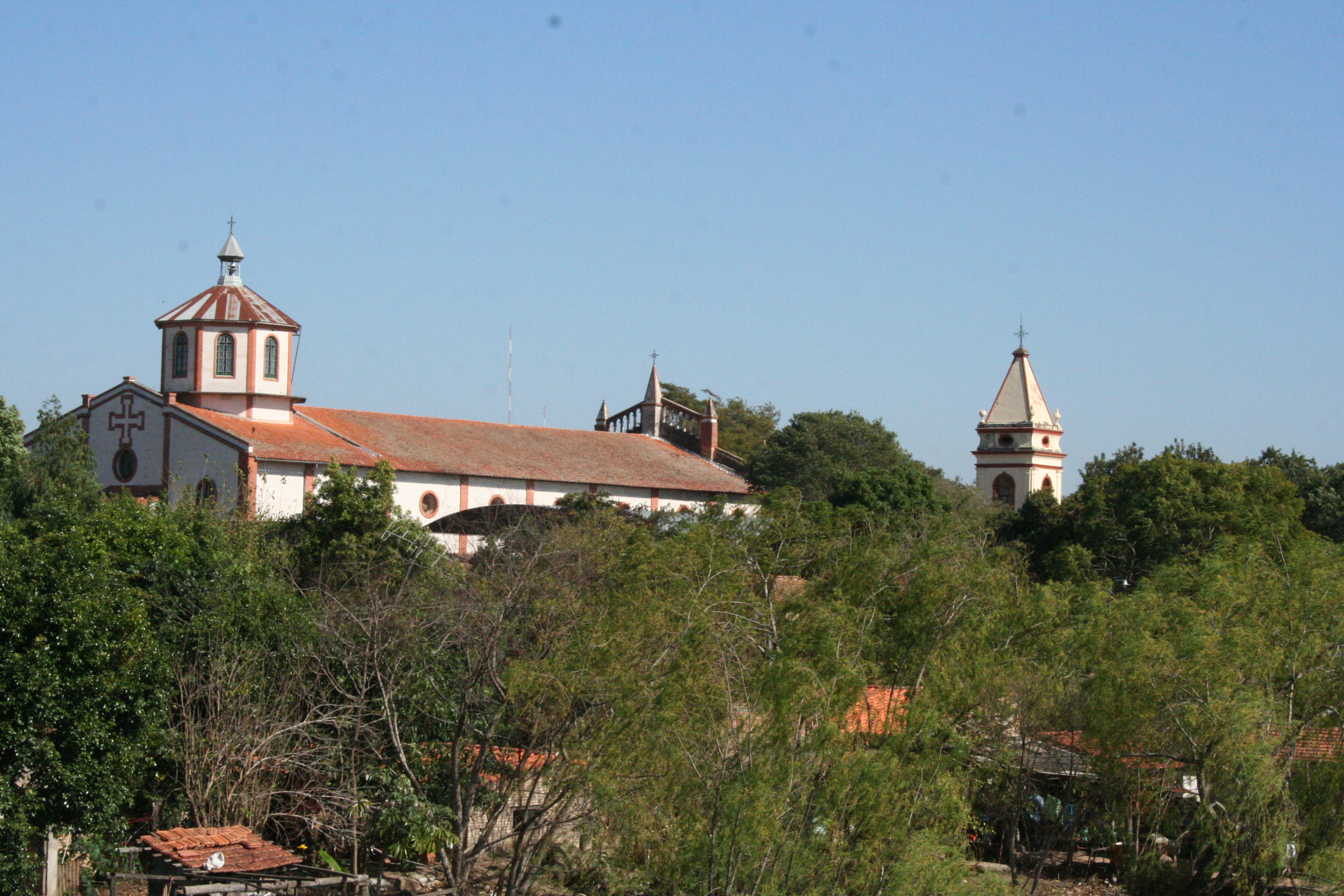
Nuestra Señora del Pilar Cathedral, Pilar, Paraguay

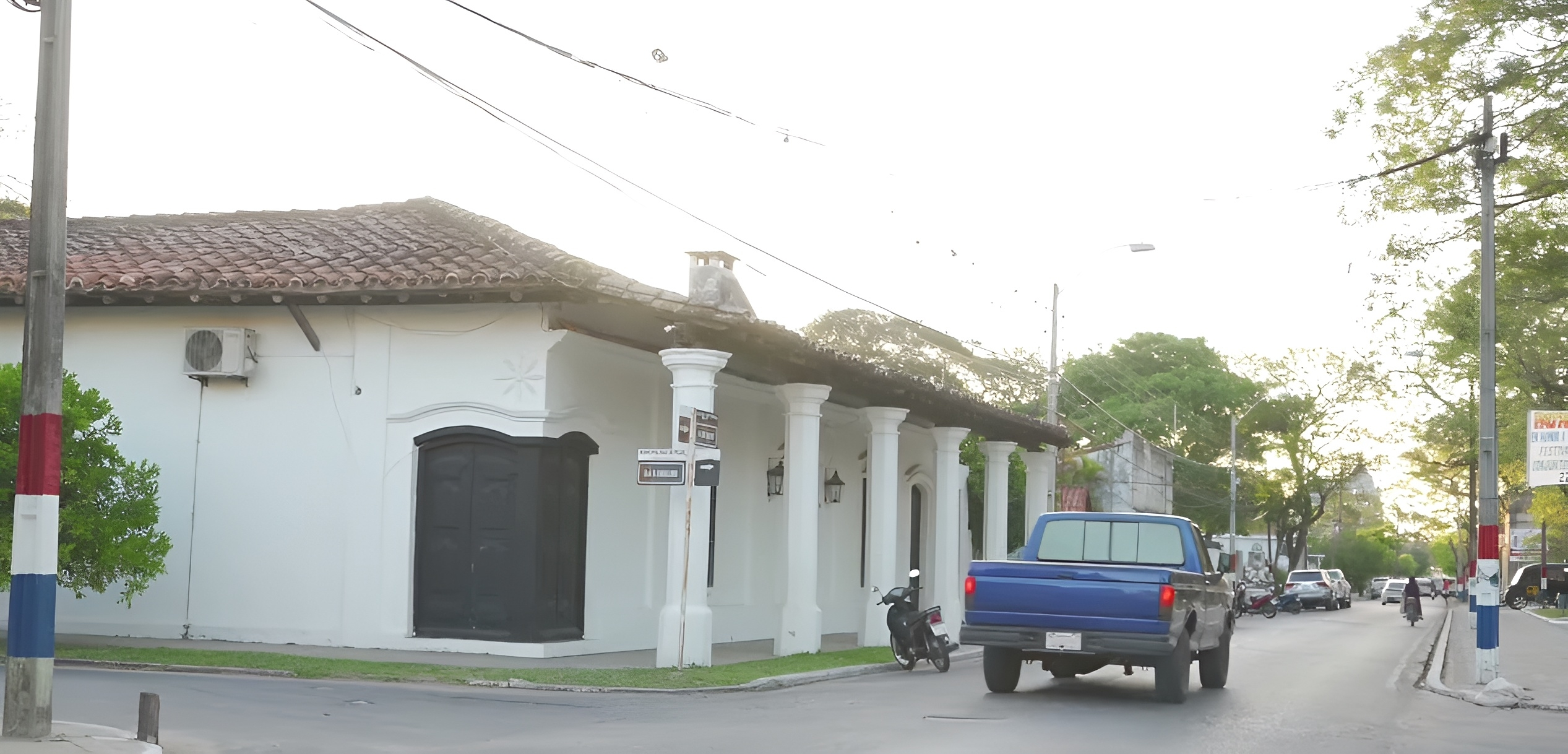
Pilar, Paraguay

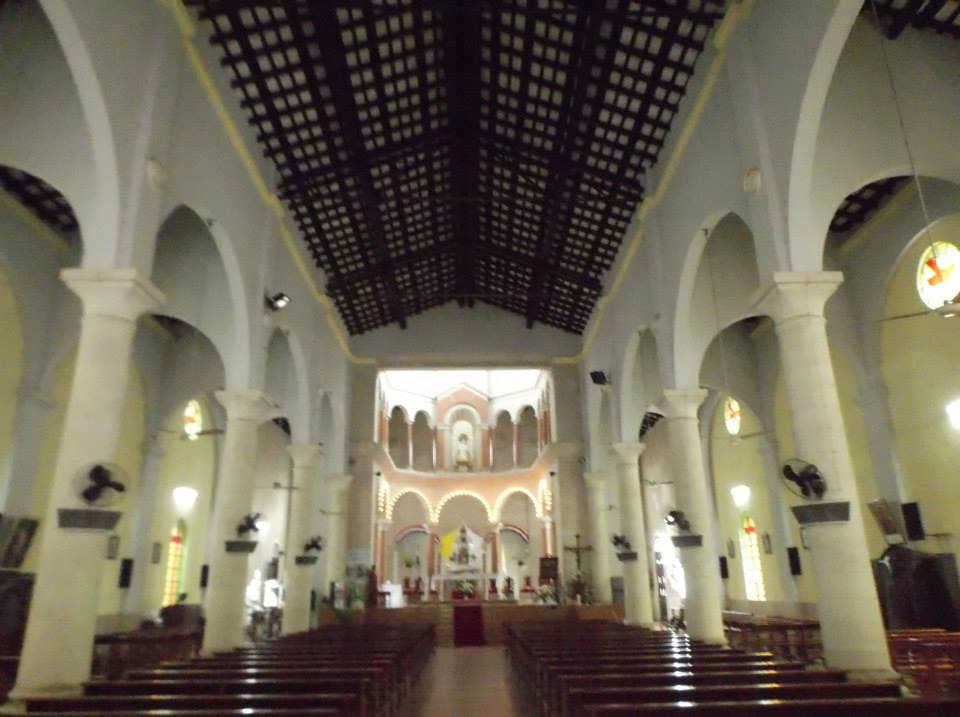
Interior of the Pilar Cathedral, Paraguay

== Notable people ==
- Pedro Alliana (born 1974), politician
- Julián Benítez (born 1989), footballer
- Hugo Brizuela (born 1969), footballer
- Roberto Cabañas (1961–2017), footballer
- Manuel Domínguez (1868–1935), politician
- José Ricardo Mazó (1927–1987), poet

== Sister cities ==
Pilar has the following sister cities:

- Carmelo, Uruguay
- Reconquista, Argentina
