= Guaraní International Airport =

Guaraní International Airport Aeropuerto Internacional Guaraní
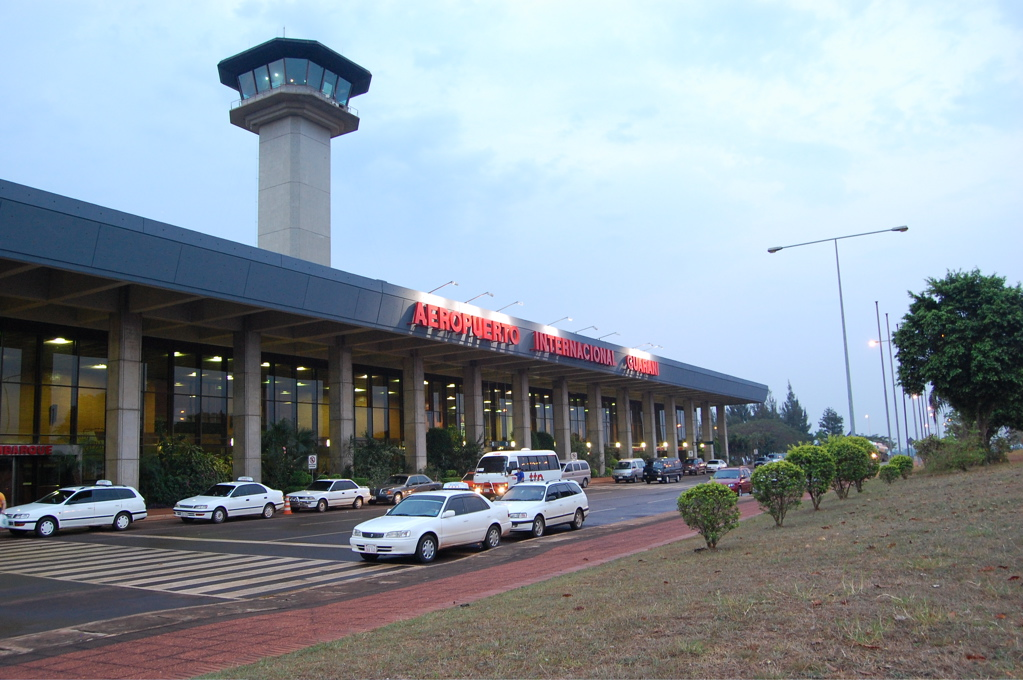
- IATA: AGT; ICAO: SGES

Summary
- Airport type: Public/Military
- Serves: Ciudad del Este
- Location: Minga Guazú, Paraguay
- Opened: 20 August 1993; 33 years ago
- Time zone: Time in Paraguay (UTC−03:00)
- Elevation AMSL: 258 m (846 ft)
- Coordinates: 25°27′20″S 054°50′37″W

Map
- Location of airport in Paraguay

Runways
Direction	Length		Surface
Direction	m	ft	Surface
05/23	3,400	11,154	Asphalt

Statistics (2025)
- Passengers: 3,402 ▼56%
- Aircraft Operations: 5,937 ▲11%
- Metric tonnes of cargo: 11,723 ▲3%
- Statistics: DINAC

Guaraní International Airport (IATA: AGT, ICAO: SGES) is an international airport located in the municipality of Minga Guazú, and serving Ciudad del Este. It is the second most important and international airport in Paraguay.

== History ==
The airport was dedicated on 20 August 1993.

The facility was built to replace the former Alejo García Airport in Ciudad del Este, which eventually was surrounded by the city's development.

Even though during the 1990s, the airport had an important passenger movement with up to four flights a day with airlines such as Ladesa, Arpa, and the Paraguayan Military Transport, it found is vocation as a cargo hub for the import of goods from Asia and North America to feed the free trade zone of Ciudad del Este.

== Airlines and destinations ==
=== Cargo ===
Airlines	Destinations
Avianca Cargo	Bogota, Campinas, Santiago de Chile
Atlas Air	Miami
Azul Logística	Campinas (begins 1 December 2026)
LATAM Cargo Chile	Santiago de Chile
Western Global Airlines	Miami

== Statistics ==
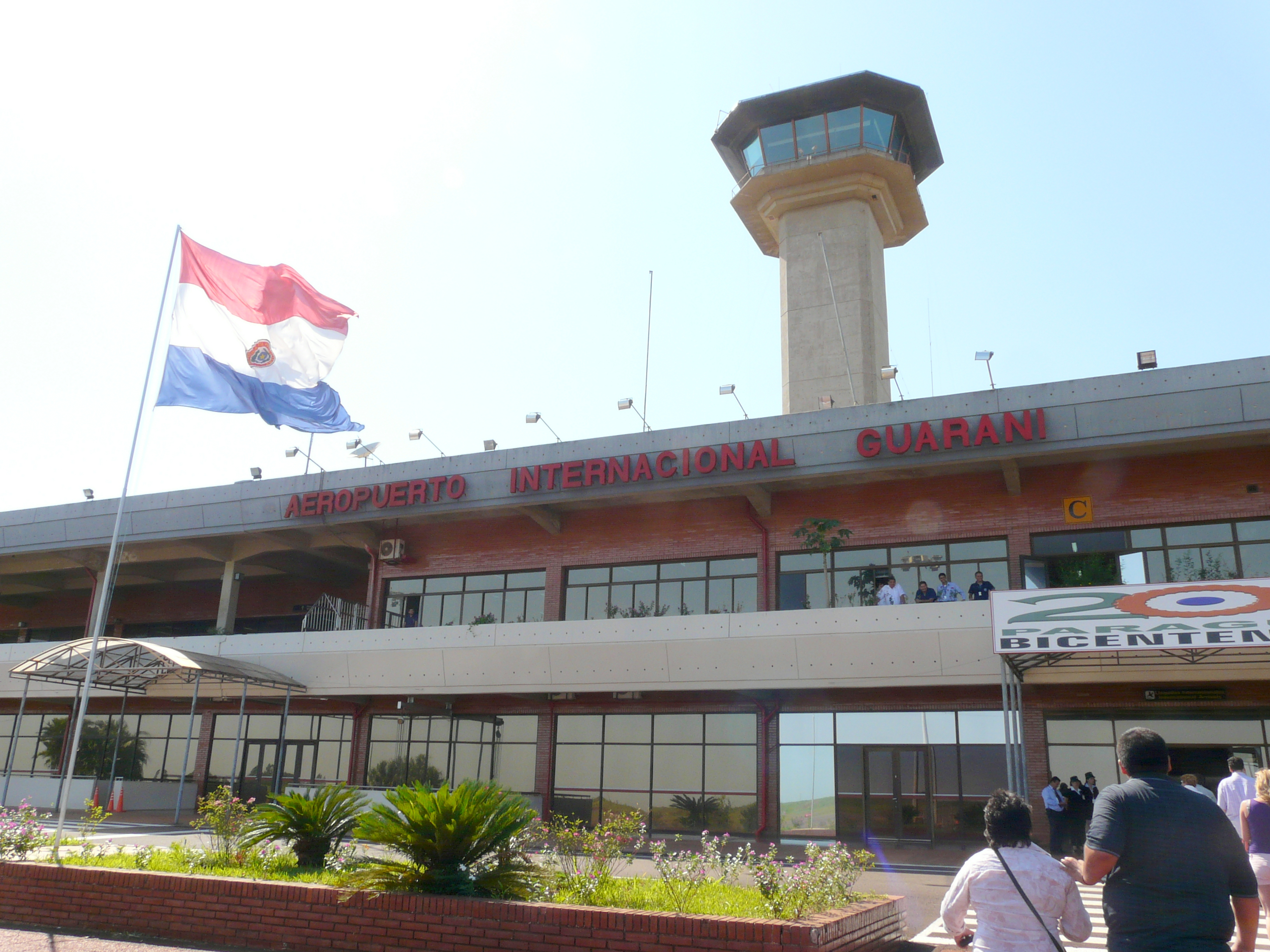
Terminal exterior

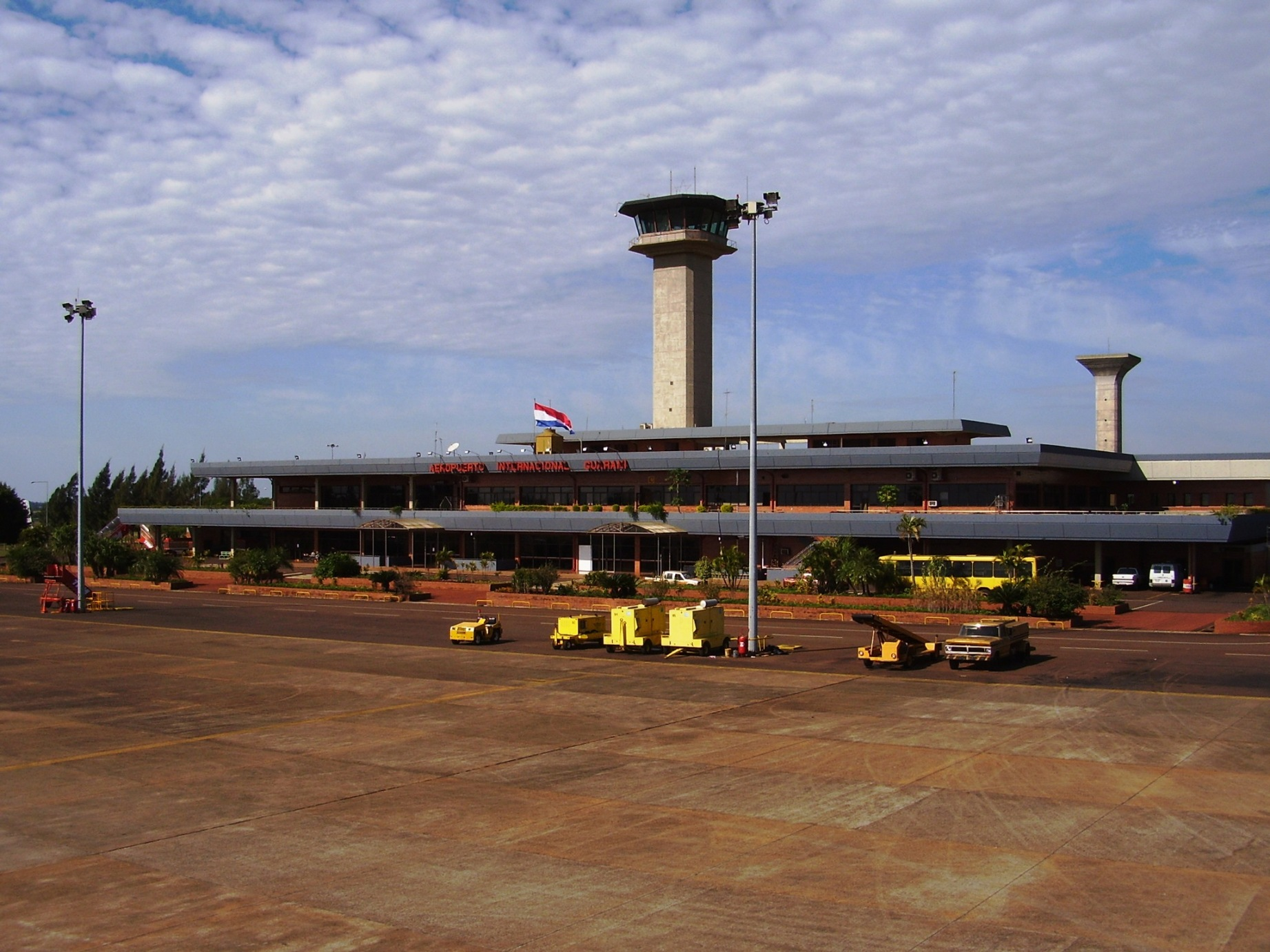
Terminal air side

Following is the number of passenger, aircraft and cargo movements at the airport, according to the Dirección Nacional de Aeronáutica Civil (DINAC) reports:

Year	Passenger	Aircraft	Cargo (t)
2025	3,402 ▼56%	5,937 ▲11%	11,723 ▲3%
2024	7,722 ▲14%	5,349 ▲4%	11,412 ▲30%
2023	6,761 ▲450%	5,149 ▲17%	8,778 ▲55%
2022	1,230 ▼78%	4,384 ▼7%	5,666 ▲1%
2021	5,591 ▼21%	4,697 ▲49%	5,598 ▲17%
2020	7,054 ▼78%	3,157 ▼55%	4,799 ▼24%
2019	32,573 ▼22%	7,002 ▼1%	6,342 ▲2%
2018	41,512 ▲1%	7,050 ▲7%	6,237 ▼25%
2017	40,923 ▼6%	6,579 ▲5%	8,319 ▲28%
2016	43,622 ▲64%	6,266 ▲1%	6,507 ▲15%
2015	26,660 ▼25%	6,175 ▼12%	5,683 ▼36%
2014	35,769 ▼35%	7,040 ▲7%	8,881 ▼14%
2013	55,315 ▼13%	6,590 ▼8%	10,377 ▼22%
2012	63,612 ▲8%	7,199 ▼2%	13,386 ▼5%
2011	59,155 ▲30%	7,361 ▲1%	14,128 ▲15%
2010	45,566 ▲31%	7,261 ▲19%	12,301 ▲30%
2009	34,671 ▼48%	6,112 ▼8%	9,443 ▲1%
2008	66,531	6,663	9,349

== Access ==
The airport, located within the municipality of Minga Guazú is located 25 km (16 mi) from downtown Ciudad del Este.

== See also ==
- List of airports in Paraguay
- Transport in Paraguay
- List of airports by ICAO code: S#SG - Paraguay
