= Mariscal Estigarribia =

- Town
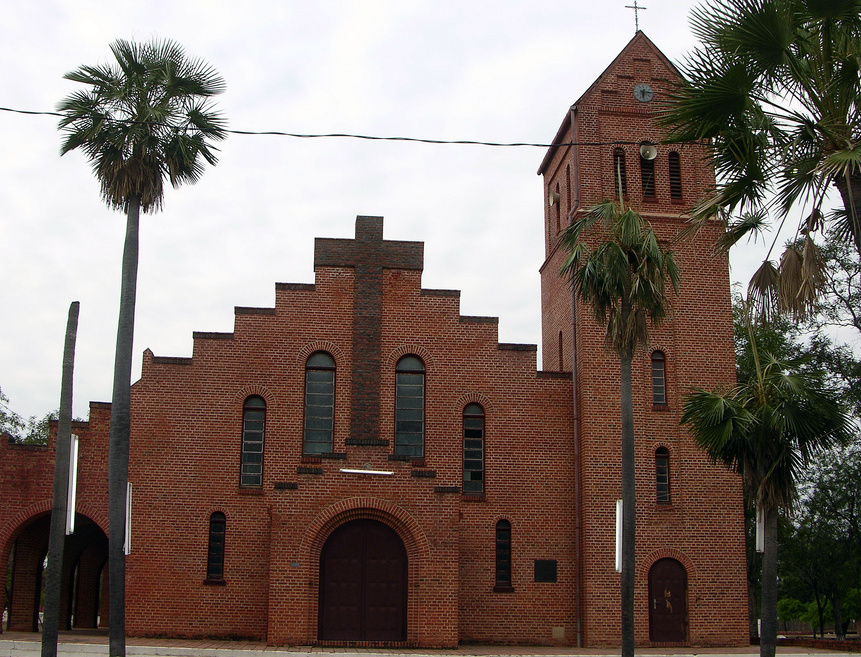
- Old cathedral of Mariscal Estigarribia

- Location in Paraguay
- Coordinates: 22°2′0″S 60°38′0″W
- Country: Paraguay
- Department: Boquerón
- Climate: Aw/BSh

Mariscal Estigarribia (Spanish pronunciation: [maɾisˈkal estiɣaˈriβja]) is a town in the Boquerón Department of Paraguay. It is home to Dr. Luis María Argaña International Airport (IATA code: ESG).

== Strategic importance ==
The airport was constructed by Paraguayan military engineers between 1977 and 1986, as part of an intended free-trade zone to help in the development of the northern Chaco region.

400 US troops arrived in Paraguay in July 2005, shortly after the Paraguayan government signed a visiting forces agreement with the United States, in support of joint exercises with the Paraguayan military which took place between July 2005 and December 2006.

== Climate ==
Mariscal Estigarribia lies right on the boundary of a tropical savanna climate (Köppen Aw) and a hot semi-arid climate (BSh). It is characterised by sweltering summers with occasional heavy thunderstorms, and dry winters with very warm afternoons and usually pleasant mornings. The minimum temperature of 34.0 °C (93.2 °F) recorded on November 13, 2023 in Mariscal José Félix Estigarribia, is considered the highest minimum temperature recorded in South America.

Climate data for Mariscal Estigarribia (1991-2020, extremes 1961-present)
Month	Jan	Feb	Mar	Apr	May	Jun	Jul	Aug	Sep	Oct	Nov	Dec	Year
Record high °C (°F)	46.4 (115.5)	42.6 (108.7)	43.0 (109.4)	39.0 (102.2)	37.2 (99.0)	36.2 (97.2)	37.8 (100.0)	40.6 (105.1)	43.6 (110.5)	44.5 (112.1)	44.5 (112.1)	44.2 (111.6)	46.4 (115.5)
Mean daily maximum °C (°F)	36.1 (97.0)	34.8 (94.6)	33.6 (92.5)	30.9 (87.6)	27.1 (80.8)	26.0 (78.8)	26.7 (80.1)	30.2 (86.4)	32.7 (90.9)	34.8 (94.6)	35.1 (95.2)	35.7 (96.3)	32.0 (89.6)
Daily mean °C (°F)	28.5 (83.3)	27.5 (81.5)	26.3 (79.3)	23.9 (75.0)	20.3 (68.5)	19.2 (66.6)	18.7 (65.7)	21.3 (70.3)	24.0 (75.2)	26.7 (80.1)	27.3 (81.1)	28.2 (82.8)	24.3 (75.7)
Mean daily minimum °C (°F)	23.1 (73.6)	22.7 (72.9)	21.5 (70.7)	19.0 (66.2)	15.5 (59.9)	14.0 (57.2)	12.6 (54.7)	14.6 (58.3)	17.3 (63.1)	20.8 (69.4)	21.6 (70.9)	22.9 (73.2)	18.8 (65.8)
Record low °C (°F)	13.0 (55.4)	10.6 (51.1)	9.2 (48.6)	6.0 (42.8)	−0.5 (31.1)	−2.0 (28.4)	−5.1 (22.8)	−4.0 (24.8)	3.4 (38.1)	8.6 (47.5)	8.4 (47.1)	12.2 (54.0)	−5.1 (22.8)
Average precipitation mm (inches)	119.2 (4.69)	119.2 (4.69)	107.2 (4.22)	70.2 (2.76)	38.4 (1.51)	20.7 (0.81)	6.8 (0.27)	7.5 (0.30)	15.5 (0.61)	52.9 (2.08)	88.1 (3.47)	112.8 (4.44)	759.6 (29.91)
Average precipitation days (≥ 0.1 mm)	9	7	8	8	6	4	3	3	3	5	7	8	71
Average relative humidity (%)	63	65	67	70	70	69	62	56	52	53	58	62	62
Mean monthly sunshine hours	244.3	254.8	209.3	224.3	187.7	150.4	180.0	227.0	232.6	205.7	239.0	223.6	2,580.5
Source 1: NOAA (extremes, precipitation days, humidity 1961-1990)
Source 2: Meteo Climat (sun, 1991-2020), Ogimet
