= Transport in Paraguay =

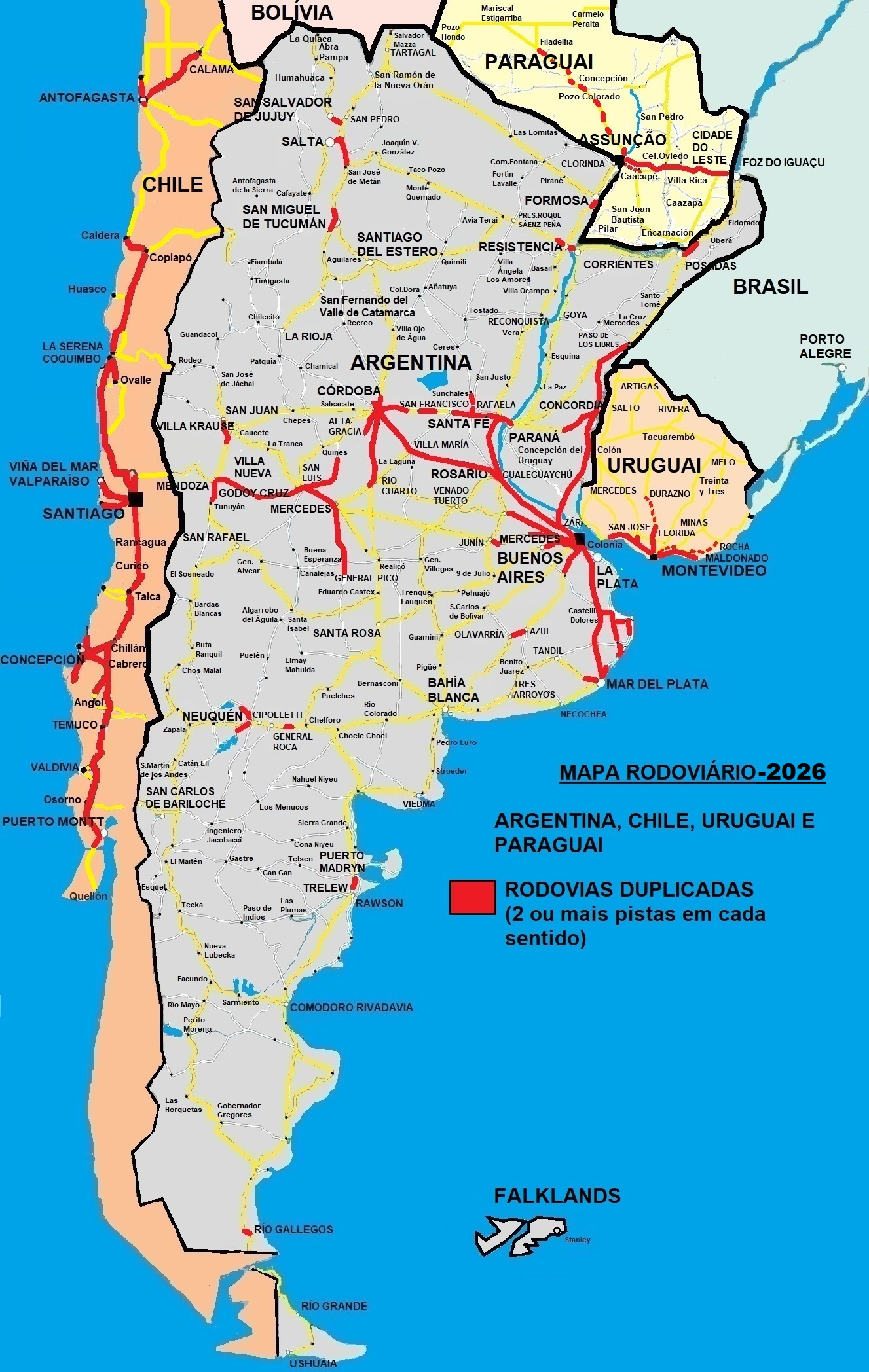
Road system in South America, with divided highways highlighted in red.

Paraguay's transportation system ranges from adequate to poor, largely depending on the region of the country. The country has a network of roads, railroads, rivers, and airports, but significant infrastructure and regulation improvements are needed.

== Roads ==
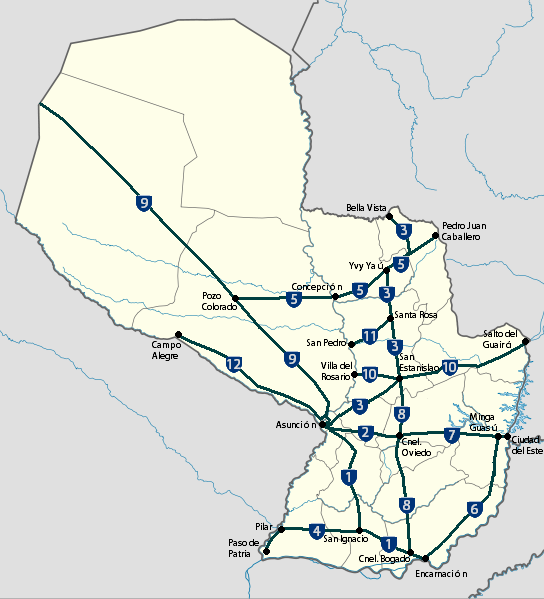
Paraguay National Routes.

Estimates vary on the total extent of Paraguay's road system, from more than 60,000 kilometres (37,000 mi) to less than 30,000 kilometres (19,000 mi). The discrepancies seem to be the result of differing standards regarding what constitutes a road. Thousands of kilometers of unpaved rural roads exist. Paraguay has about 16,630 kilometres (10,330 mi) of paved, major feeder roads. The core network connects Asunción, Encarnación, and Ciudad del Este, on the border with Brazil, where it connects later with the Port of Paranaguá. In 2024, the first duplicated highway in Paraguay was created, the PY-02. The Trans-Chaco highway is only partially finished, the paved portion ending at Mariscal Estigarribia. Bolivia's portion of the highway, in contrast, is entirely paved. For trade purposes, the paved highways from Ciudad del Este to the Brazilian port of Paranaguá are particularly important. Additionally, the roads connecting Paraguay to Buenos Aires are adequate.

Route 15 has been one of the central points in the country's road advancement. This highway (currently under construction) is expected to become an international logistics center by becoming part of the Bi-Oceanic Corridor, and being the shortest passage between the Chilean ports of Antofagasta and Iquique on the Pacific Ocean and the Brazilian port of Santos on the Atlantic Ocean. In February 2022, Paraguay inaugurated 275 km of the road (about half of the route), connecting Carmelo Peralta (Alto Paraguay), on the border with Brazil, to Loma Plata (Boquerón), in the center of the country. In 2025, another 224 km were already being paved between the cities of Mariscal Estigarribia and Pozo Hondo, on the border with Argentina, with completion scheduled for 2026, basically completing the road.

Classification	Length	
Classification	Km (mi)	%
National Routes	4,444 (2,761)	7.6
Departmental Routes	5,333 (3,314)	9.2
Minor roads	13,419 (8,338)	23.1
Not inventoried minor roads*	35,000 (21,748)	60.1
Total:	58,196 (36,161)	100

* Estimated

== Railways ==
The government owns the country's sole railroad company, including a 438-kilometre (272 mi) line from Asunción to Encarnación. An effort to privatize the company in 2002 failed when no buyer could be secured because of the steep investment required to make the line profitable. Currently, only a small section of the line is open. It is used for tourist traffic. Paraguay's railroads operate on a standard 1.435-meter gauge.

The total length of rail in Paraguay is 971 kilometres (603 mi). 441 kilometres (274 mi) of that is standard gauge at 1,435 mm (4 ft 8 1/2 in). Another 60 kilometres (37 mi) is narrow-gauge at 1,000 mm (3 ft 3 3/8 in), and 470 kilometres (290 mi) of the total railway is privately owned.

== Inland waterways ==
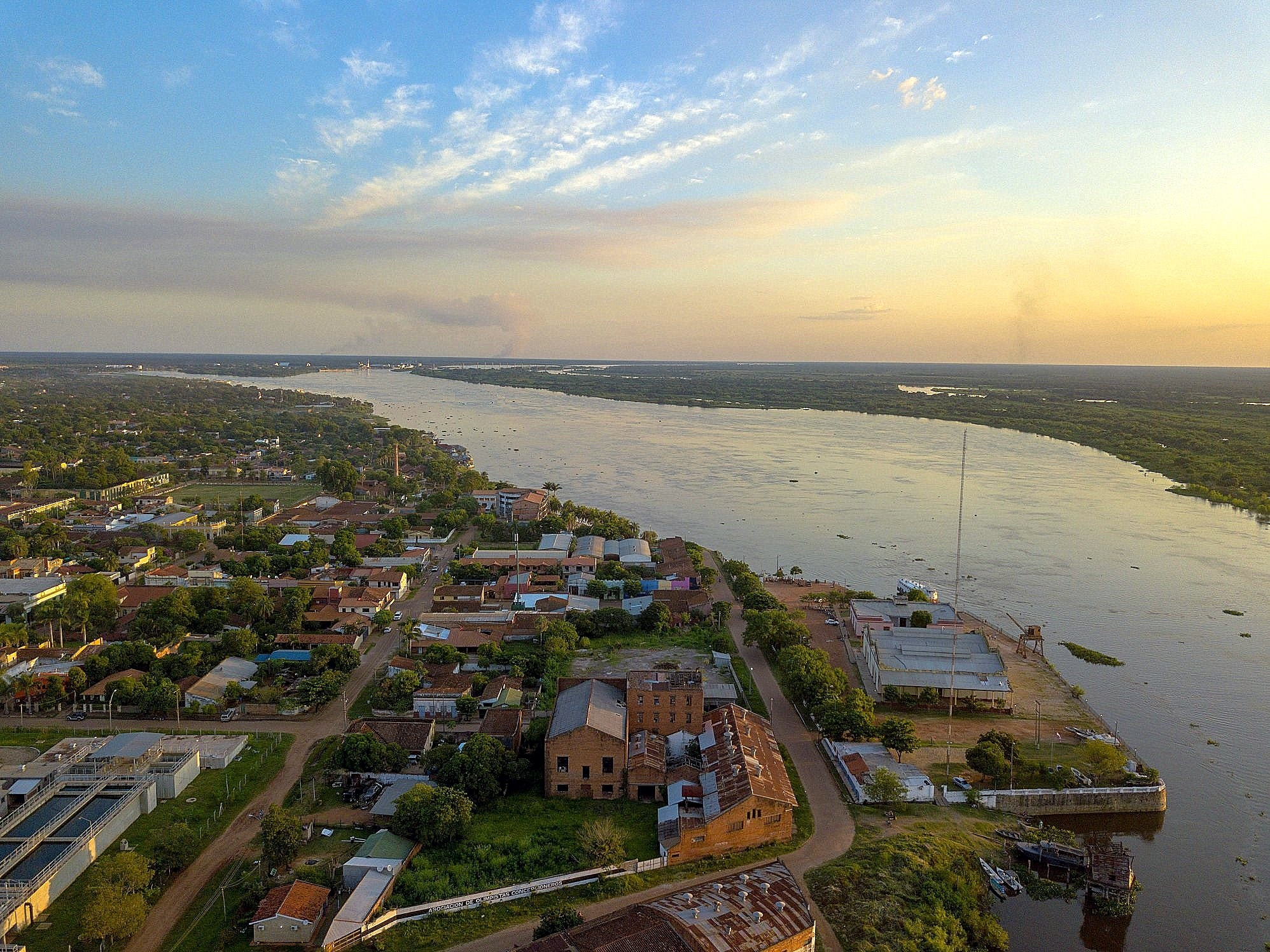
The River Paraguay at the town of Concepción

Paraguay has 3,100 kilometres (1,900 mi) of inland waterways. The Paraguay and Paraná are the country's two main rivers. The Paraguay River, with headwaters at Mato Grosso, Brazil, flows southward, converging with the Paraná in southwestern Paraguay, and then flowing to the Río de la Plata estuary in Argentina, the entrance for the great majority of ships servicing Paraguay's ports.

== Ports and harbors ==
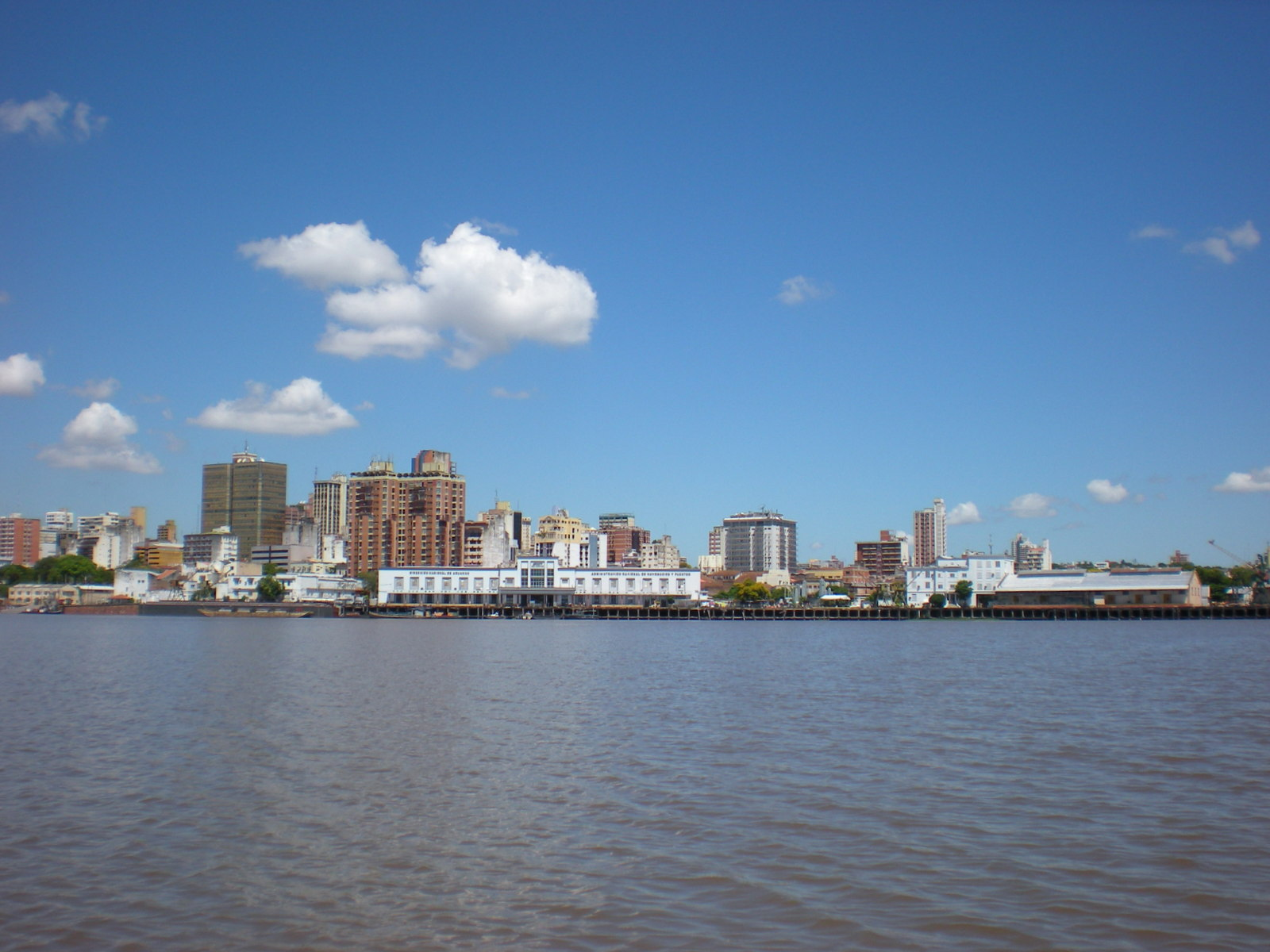
The Asunción port in 2011

Villeta, located on the Paraguay River south of Asunción, serves as Paraguay's primary port. Asunción, long the country's only modern port, Encarnación (on the Paraná River), and San Antonio serve as the country's other major ports. Paraguay's ports are split between state and private ownership. The country's twenty private ports, however, are far more efficient, handling nearly 90% of soybean exports.

== Merchant marine ==
Total: 110

Container ship: 3

General cargo: 25

Oil tanker: 5

Other: 77 (2021)

== Airports ==
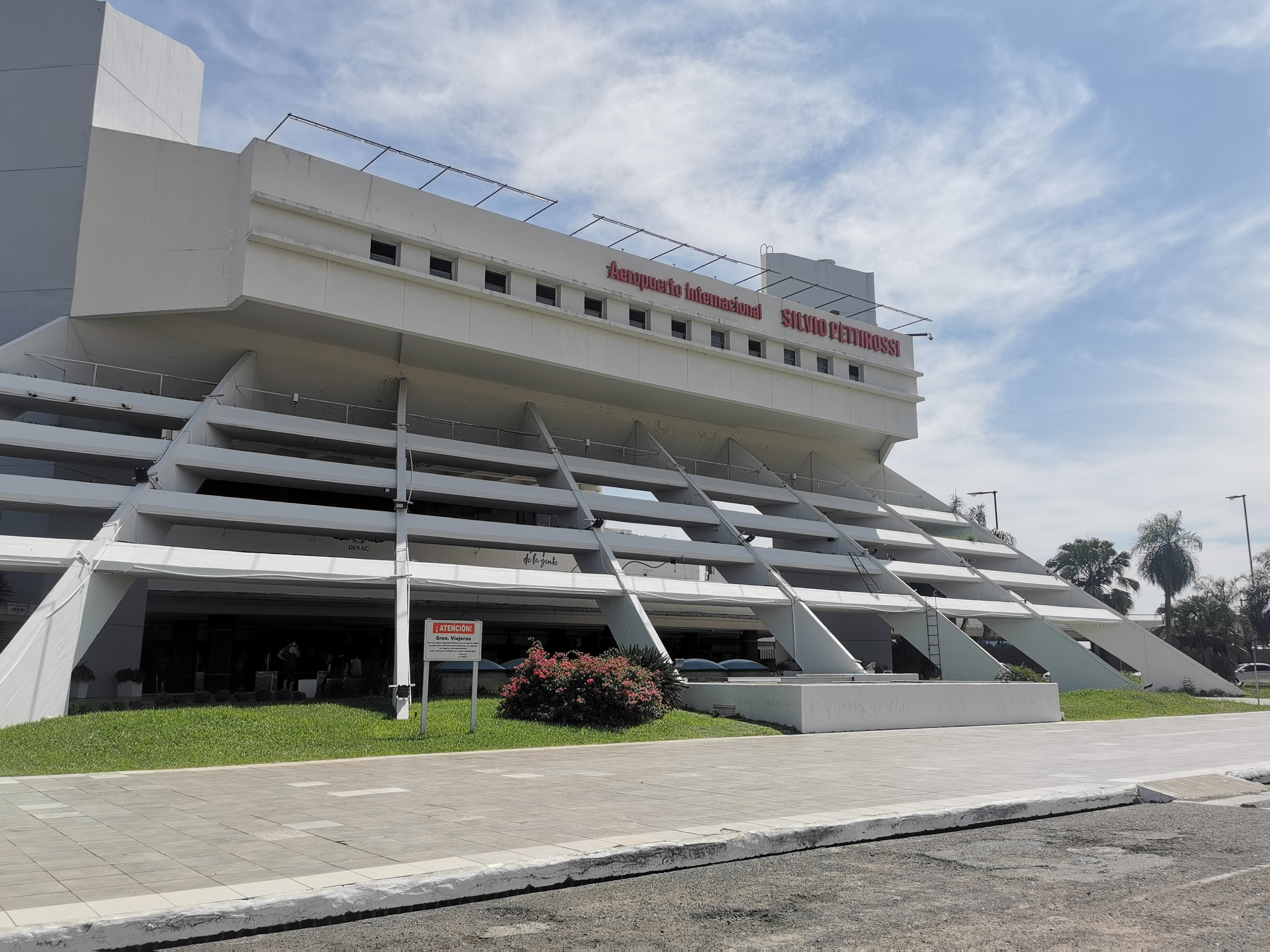
Silvio Pettirossi International Airport in 2021

As of 2013, Paraguay has 799 airports but only 15 with paved runways. The airport serving Asunción, Silvio Pettirossi International Airport, is the country's major airport for international and domestic flights. Another airport is Guaraní International Airport, located near Ciudad del Este and the Brazilian border, but it has been unable to compete with the nearby international airport at Foz do Iguaçu in Brazil. Improvements in technology are needed to bring Paraguay's airports up to international standards. Paraguay privatized the state-owned Líneas Aéreas Paraguayas in 1994.

== See also ==
- Paraguay
- Rail transport by country
