= Electricity sector in Paraguay =

Electricity sector of Paraguay
Data
- Electricity coverage (2022): 99.2%
- Installed capacity (2023): 13,317MW
- Share of fossil energy: <0.1%
- Share of renewable energy: >100%
- GHG emissions from electricity generation (2005): 3.85 Mt CO_{2}
- Average electricity use (2023): 4769kWh per capita
- Distribution losses (2005): 31%; (LAC average in 2005: 13.6%)
- Transmission losses (2003): 7.3%

Consumption by sector (% of total)
- Residential: 41%
- Industrial: 26%
- Commercial: 18.3%

Tariffs and financing
- Average residential tariff (US$/kW·h, 2006): 0.056; (LAC average in 2005: 0.115)
- Average industrial tariff (US$/kW·h, 2006): 0.276-0.320; (LAC average in 2005: 0.107)
- Average commercial tariff (US$/kW·h, 2006): 0.090

Services
- Sector unbundling: No
- Share of private sector in generation: 0%
- Competitive supply to large users: No
- Competitive supply to residential users: No

Institutions
- No. of service providers: 1
- Responsibility for regulation: ANDE
- Responsibility for policy-setting: Vice ministry of Mines and Energy
- Responsibility for the environment: Ministry of Environment and Sustainable Development, MADES
- Electricity sector law: Yes (1993)
- Renewable energy law: Yes
- CDM transactions related to the electricity sector: 0 registered CDM projects

Paraguay is one of the few countries in Latin America that has maintained an integrated electrical system.

Because of the dominance of hydroelectricity, tariffs (mostly residential) are remarkably below the averages for the region. However, despite the abundance of resources, the Paraguayan electricity system faces difficulty due to the lack of investment in transmission and distribution networks. In addition, distribution losses are among the highest in the region.

== Electricity supply and demand ==
=== Installed capacity and generation ===
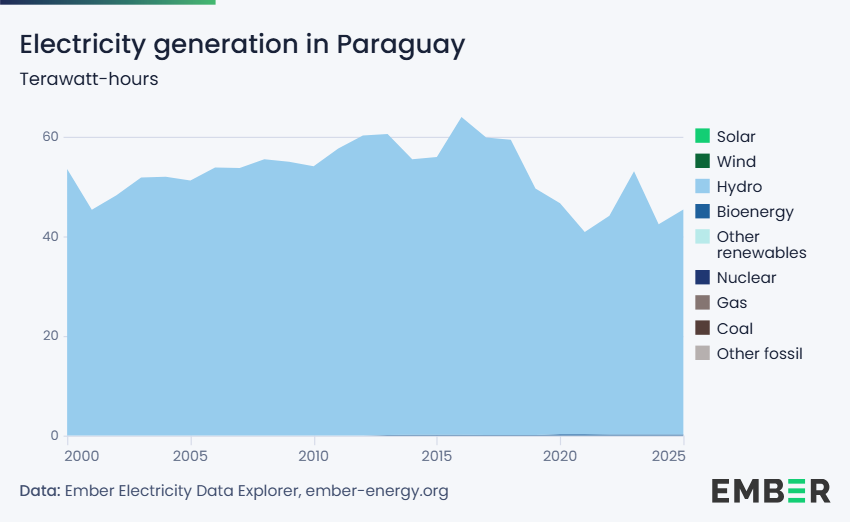
Electricity generation in Paraguay in terawatt-hours

Paraguay is the only country in Latin America with almost 100 percent hydroelectric generation capacity (8,116 MW) in 2005.

Paraguay operates two binational hydroelectric dams. Itaipu dam, by far the largest power station in the country, is operated with Brazil and has an installed capacity of 7000 MW (86 percent of Paraguay's generation capacity). Yacyretá, the second largest hydroelectric facility, has an installed capacity of 900 MW (11 percent), and is operated with Argentina. A third plant, Acaray has an installed capacity of 210 MW (3 percent). Thermal plants contribute less than 0.1 percent.

All of Paraguay's electricity for domestic consumption comes from a single facility, the binational 14 GW Itaipu hydroelectric dam.

Source	Installed capacity (MW)	Installed capacity (% of total)
Itaipu	7,000	86%
Yacyretá	900	11%
Acaray	210	3%
Thermal	6	0.1%
TOTAL	8,116	100.1%

Source: ESMAP, 2006. Installed capacity shown for Itaipu and Yacyretá refers only to the Paraguayan share in these plants.

While total generation amounted to 51.17 TWh in 2005, consumption was only 5.01 TWh, with exports as high as 43.8 TWh.

=== Demand ===
In 2005, total electricity consumed in Paraguay was 5.01 TWh, which corresponds to 849 kWh per capita. Electricity generated by Itaipu and Acaray, located in the East of the country, is transported to the West (to the Asunción area), where over 60% of the total national consumption is located.

Electricity consumption by consumer group is divided as follows:

- Residential: 41%
- Commercial: 18.3%
- Industrial: 26%
- Others: 14.2%

In 2004, the country consumed only 16% of its 50% share of Itaipu's production, exporting the rest to Brazil. As for Yacyreta, Paraguay consumes less than 1% of its share, exporting the rest to Argentina.

The electricity interconnections that allow power exchanges with Brazil and Argentina are:

Entities	Country	Supply point	Voltage (kV)	Power (MW)
FURNAS, ELECTROSUL, ELECTROBRAS	Brazil	Itaipu	500	7,000
EBISA	Argentina	Yacyretá	500	1,540
ENERSUL	Brazil	Pedro Juan Caballero	23	3
COPEL	Brazil	Acaray	132	50
EMSA	Argentina	C.A. López	132	30
TRANSNEA/EDEFOR	Argentina	Guarambaré	220	80

Source: ESMAP, 2006

== Access to electricity ==
In 2005, almost 90% of the population in Paraguay had access to electricity, which is just slightly below than the 94.6% average for LAC

The 2002 Census revealed that 87% of the households without electricity were located in rural areas, where access was about 77%. Rural coverage varies considerably among the different regions of the country. It is lowest in the remote and sparsely populated Chaco, or Western region. The table below shows rural coverage by Department for 2002:

See also:Departments of Paraguay (including a map)

Department/region	Rural households with electricity(%)
Concepción	68
San Pedro	78
Cordillera	86
Guairá	87
Caaguazú	78
Caazapá	68
Itaipuá	81
Misiones	79
Paraguarí	82
Alto Paraná	82
Central	93
Ñeembucú	62
Amambay	43
Canindeyú	58
Average Eastern Region	78
Presidente Hayes	51
Boquerón	57
Alto Paraguay	29
Average Western Region	46
National Average	77

Source: Pulfer, 2005 (from 2002 Census)

Since 2004, the National Electricity Administration (ANDE) has been carrying out a Program to Recover Distribution Works under the Self-Help System (Sistema de Autoayuda), which aims at the regularization of all the low and medium voltage distribution networks. This program, with a 10-year time-horizon, is implemented according to priorities defined by the conservation status of the networks involved. Under this program, installations that do not comply with current ANDE's rules are replaced.

== Service quality ==
=== Interruption frequency and duration ===
In 2005, the average number of interruptions per subscriber was 16.4, while duration of interruptions per subscriber was 7.58 hours. While the number of interruptions is just slightly above than the weighted average for LAC, 13 interruptions, the duration is well below the weighted average of 14 hours.

==== Blackouts ====
Despite consuming less than 6 TWh per year and exporting close to 45 TWh per year, Paraguay faces blackouts as well as a serious risk of suffering an energy crisis. This is the result of the limitations of both the transmission and distribution systems. The ceiling of the system is placed by ANDE's at 1,700 MW, with demand above 1,500 MW in 2008. Transmission capacity is urgently needed to avoid a supply crisis in a system in which quality and an adequate technical service is practically nonexistent.

Different authors believe that the price received for the electricity sold to Brazil (from Paraguay's share in Itaipu) and also to Argentina to some extent (from its share in Yacyreta) is currently too low. The “fair price” established by the Itaipu Treaty was conceived on the basis of a “compensation for concession of energy” and not on the basis of a commercial exchange. This price has remained very low (about US$2.81 per MWh). It is argued that, if this price was more in line with actual electricity prices in the Brazilian market, Paraguay would have enough resources to strengthen its electricity transmission capacity.

=== Distribution and transmission losses ===
In 2005, distribution losses in Paraguay were has high as 31%, well above the 13.5% weighted average for LAC and up from about 22% in 2001

System losses have become a serious problem in the last few years, having followed a continuous upward trend. The highest percentage of losses occurs in the National Interconnected System (SIN), while the remaining corresponds to the bi-national enterprises. In the SIN, distribution losses represented 23% of the total in 2003, while transmission losses, according to ANDE, were 7.3%. ANDE has established a 23% target for electricity losses for the year 2010.

== Responsibilities in the electricity sector ==
Responsibilities in the Paraguayan electricity sector are concentrated in a single, vertically integrated public monopoly, the National Electricity Administration (Administración Nacional de Electricidad, ANDE).

=== Policy and regulation ===
Law 167/93 indicates that the Vice ministry of Mines and Energy (under the Ministry of Public Works and Communication) is responsible for establishing and guiding energy policy, as well as for the study of the technical, economic, financial and legal aspects that promote energy use. However, the Vice ministry does not have the adequate resources to effectively perform its functions.

In practice, all the energy responsibilities are concentrated in ANDE, which is the de facto electricity regulator and provider. ANDE also elaborates the tariff structure, which is then analyzed and approved by the Economic Council of the Executive Power. The Council usually sets lower tariffs to the ones proposed by ANDE, which leads to a lack of resources for the necessary investment for adequate performance of the electricity system.

=== Generation, transmission and distribution ===
ANDE controls the country's entire electricity market, including generation, transmission and distribution. ANDE operates only one hydroelectric dam, Acaray, and six thermal power plants, with total installed capacity of 220 MW. It is also responsible for Paraguay's share of Itaipú and Yacyretá, the two bi-national hydroelectric facilities (See bi-national facilities above).

ANDE operates 3,400 kilometres (2,100 miles) of transmission lines in the Interconnected National System, divided in 6 subsystems, and 1,080 kilometres (670 miles) of distribution lines. It is also responsible for all of the distribution, with two exceptions: CLYFSA (Compañía de Luz y Fuerza, S.A.), which has a concession to distribute and commercialize electricity in Villarrica, and the Empresas Distribuidoras Menonitas del Chaco Central.

== History of the electricity sector ==
=== Thermoelectric plants ===
In 1913 the first large power plant opened in the Puerto Sajonia neighborhood in Asunción. For a long time, this was the only large power station in the country. The decommissioned plant was declared a historic site in 2018 and is now a museum.

=== Hydroelectric plants ===
==== Itaipu dam ====
In April 1973, the governments of Paraguay and Brazil signed the Itaipu Treaty, by which it was decided to create a binational entity to hydroelectric use of the Paraná River. This entity was constituted by ANDE (Paraguay) and ELECTROBRAS (Brazil). US$100 million were contributed in equal parts by both companies.

==== Yacyretá Dam ====
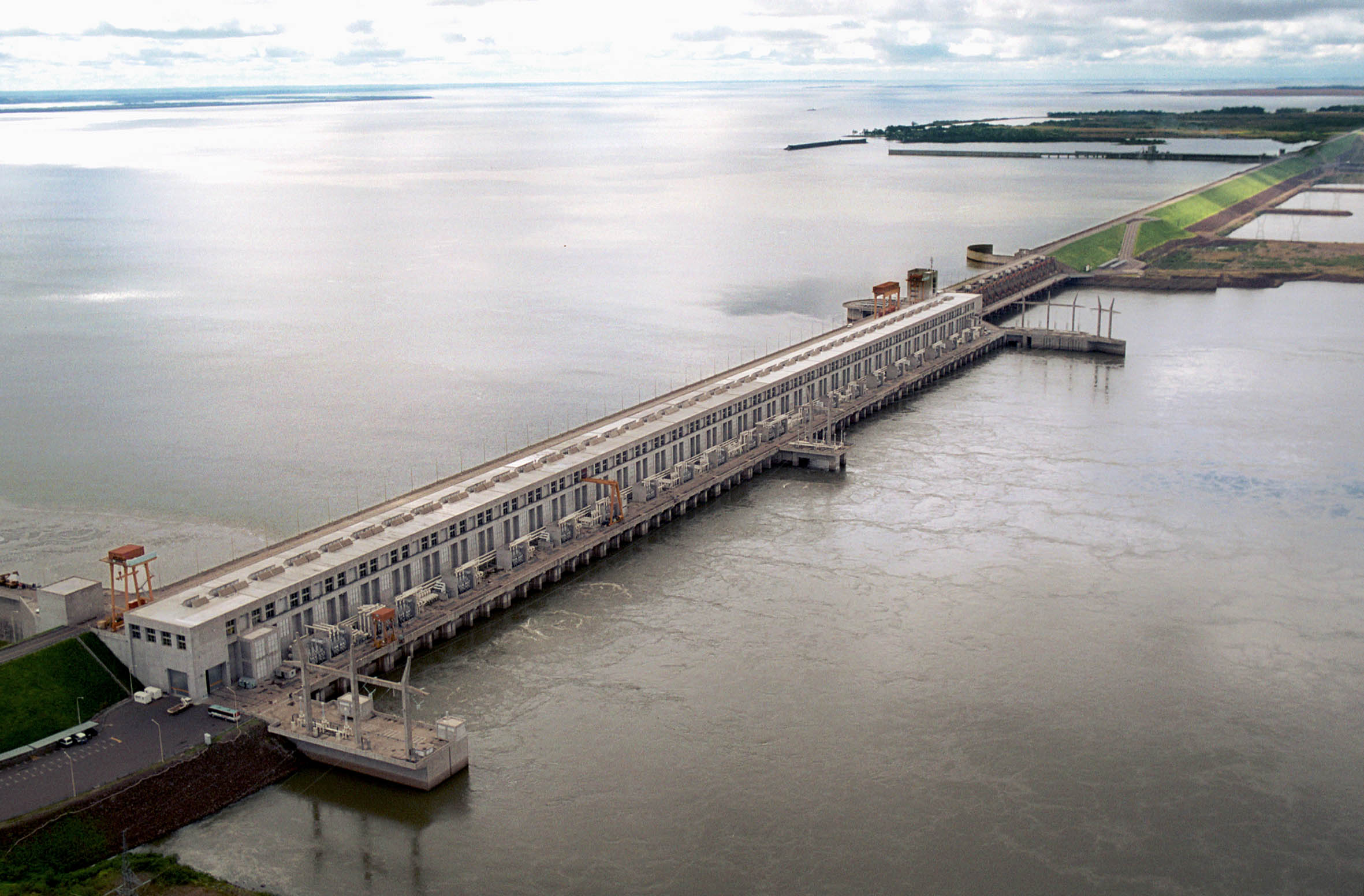
View of the Yacyretá dam from up-river

In December 1973, the governments of Argentina and Paraguay signed the Yacyreta Treaty, by which ANDE and Agua y Energía constituted the Binational Entity, whose aim is the hydroelectric use of the Paraná river. US$100 million was contributed in equal parts by each company.

==== Corpus Christi ====
In 1971, Paraguay and Argentina created the River Parana Joint Commission (Comisión Mixta del Río Paraná, COMIP), which started to carry out different studies (pre-feasibility, environmental, etc.) for the Corpus project, to be located upstream of the Paraná river, close to the towns of Corpus (in the Argentina Misiones Province and Puerto Bella Vista in Paraguay. In the mid-1980s, Argentina, Paraguay and Brazil signed a tripartite agreement that established the operating height of the project, which would allow to bring into line the operation of Corpus with those of Yacyreta and Itaipu.

The different alternatives for this project are still under study. As a large hydroelectric project, with installed capacity of about 3,000 MW and annual generation of about 19,000 GWh, Corpus is a controversial project that is opposed both at the regional and social levels. In April 1996, in a plebiscite in the Misiones Province, the construction of the dam was opposed by almost 89% of the voters.

== Tariffs and subsidies ==
=== Tariffs ===
In 2006, the average national tariff in Paraguay was US$0.080 per kWh Tariffs for the different consumer groups were:

- Residential: US$0.091/kWh (weighted average for LAC in 2005: 0.105
- Commercial: US$0.090/kWh
- Industrial: US$0.056/kWh (weighted average for LAC in 2005: 0.1075)
- General: US$0.075/kWh
- Others: US$0.094/kWh

=== Subsidies ===
In November 2004, the Paraguayan Government approved Law 2,501, which broadened the electricity social tariff applied by ANDE. The social tariff is applied to residential users below 150kWh of monthly consumption. Currently, about 37% of total customers benefit from this tariff. ANDE estimates that this share will gradually increase to 56% of the total.

== Investment and financing ==
Investments for maintenance and expansion of the necessary assets to provide electricity service have been executed with the support of multilateral credit institutions.

== Summary of private participation in the electricity sector ==
The National Electricity Administration (Administración Nacional de Electricidad, ANDE), Paraguay's state-owned utility, controls the country's entire electricity market, including generation, transmission and distribution.

Two small companies buy electricity from ANDE and have concessions to distribute and sell it: CLYFSA (Compañía de Luz y Fuerza, S.A.) in Villarrica, and the Empresas Distribuidoras Menonitas del Chaco Central.

Activity	Private participation (%)
Generation	0% of installed capacity
Transmission	0%
Distribution	Low

== Electricity and the environment ==
=== Responsibility for the environment ===
The Environmental Directorate (Secretaría del Ambiente, SEAM) is the institution in charge of environmental issues in Paraguay, focusing on natural resources management and preservation.

=== Greenhouse gas emissions ===
Paraguay emitted 3.85 million tons of CO_{2} in 2005, which corresponds to just 0.61 tCO_{2} per capita annually, the lowest rate in the LAC region after Haiti's.

=== CDM projects in electricity ===
Currently (August 2008), there are no registered CDM projects in any sector in Paraguay. The low emission factor of a fully hydroelectric system is most likely the reason for the absence of this type of projects in the electricity sector.

== External assistance ==
=== Inter-American Development Bank ===
Currently, the Inter-American Development Bank (IDB) is contributing funds and assistance to one project in the electricity sector in Paraguay:

- Phase I of a Multi-Phase Power Transmission Program supported through a US$69.5 million credit. The objective of this project, which was approved in December 2006 but has not disbursed any funds as of August 2008, is to strengthen transmission networks in already served areas as well as to extend them to areas still not being served.

The IDB is also providing technical assistance under two activities:

- Support for Paraguay's Electrical Sector Modernization. The objective of this support is to "execute studies that will formulate the fundamental and integrated actions, to increase the total loss management capacity of the ANDE in these categories: i) management of loss, ii) prospection of losses, iii) regularization of systems and facilities, iv) collection of the recovered revenue, and v) loss prevention."
- Development of a National Rural Electrification Program that will explore grid extension, renewable energy and natural gas solutions.

== See also ==
- Paraguay
- Economy of Paraguay
- Water supply and sanitation in Paraguay
- History of Paraguay
- Politics of Paraguay

== Sources ==
Casco Carreras, 2008. Presente y Futuro del Sector Energético Nacional. Centro de Análisis y Difusión de la Economía Paraguaya

ESMAP, 2006. Estrategia para el desarrollo del sector eléctrico del Paraguay.

Suarez Montorfano, 2007. El Proyecto hidroeléctrico Corpus Christi
