= Economy of Paraguay =

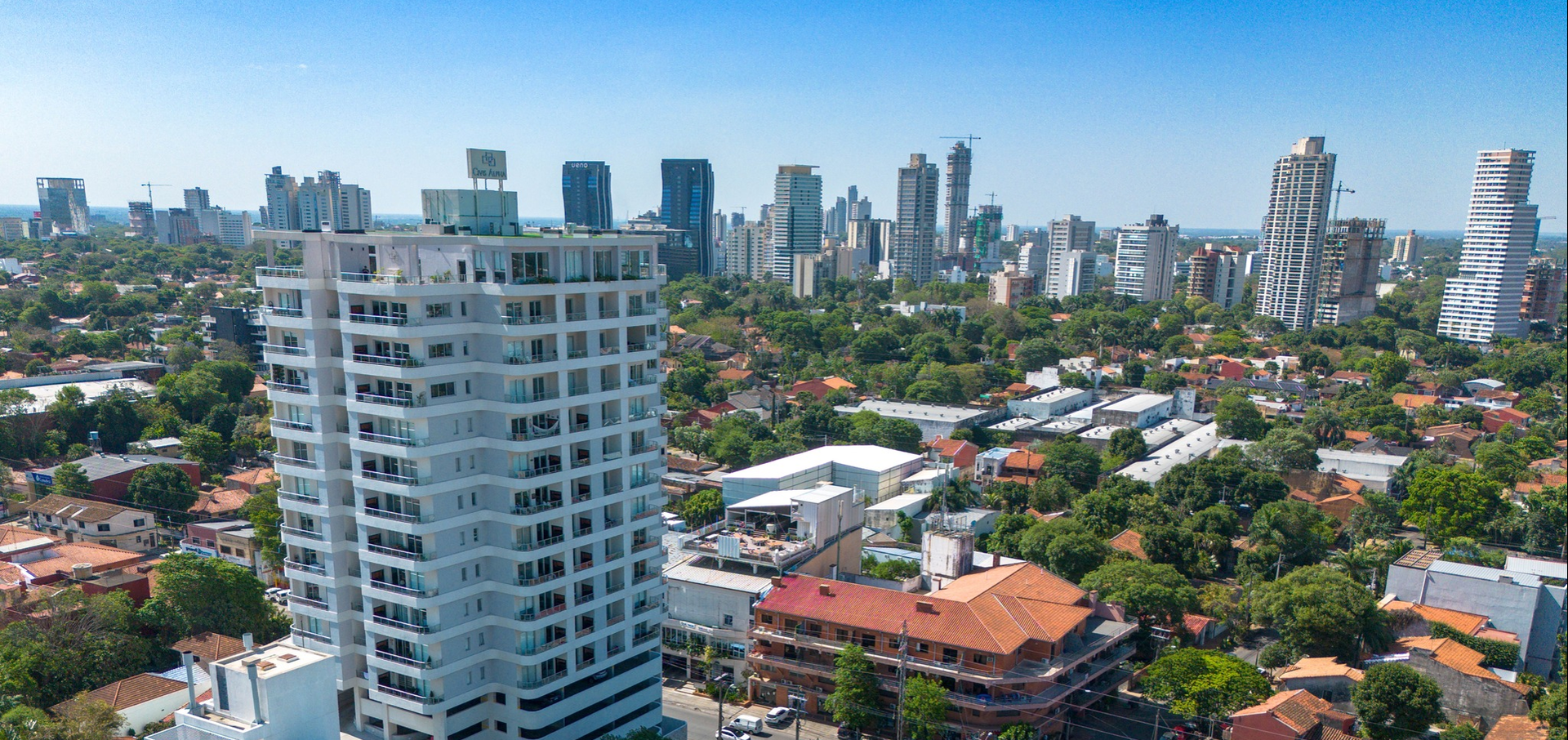
- Asunción, the capital and largest city of Paraguay
- Currency: Paraguayan guaraní (PYG, ₲)
- Fiscal year: Calendar year
- Trade organizations: WTO, Mercosur, Prosur
- Country group: Developing/Emerging; Upper-middle income economy

Statistics
- Population: ▲6,109,644 (2022 census)
- GDP: ▲$64 billion (nominal; 2026); ▲$152.86 billion (PPP; 2026)
- GDP rank: 91st (nominal; 2026); 91st (PPP; 2026)
- GDP growth: 4.5% (2026); 4.0% (2027); 3.8% (2028)
- GDP per capita: ▲$9,907 (nominal; 2026); ▲$23,662 (PPP; 2026)
- GDP per capita rank: 90th (nominal; 2026); 86th (PPP; 2026)
- GDP per capita growth: 5.4% (2025)
- GDP by sector: agriculture: 11.4%; industry: 33.5%; services: 55.1%; (2026 est.)
- Inflation (CPI): 3.7% (2020 est.)
- Population below national poverty line: ▼16.0% (2025); ▼16% on less than $8.30/day (2023)
- Gini coefficient: ▼44.4 medium (2023)
- Human Development Index: ▲0.756 high (2023) (99th); ▲0.599 medium (90th) IHDI (2023)
- Labor force: ▲3,530,715 (2019); ▲67.4% employment rate (2018)
- Labor force by occupation: agriculture: 26.5%; industry: 18.5%; services: 55%; (2008)
- Unemployment: ▼5.7% (2017 est.)
- Main industries: sugar, cement, textiles, beverages, wood products, steel, base metals, electric power

External
- Exports: ▼$11.47 billion (2024)
- Export goods: soybeans and derivatives, electric energy, beef, maize, rice, wheat, feed, cotton, edible oils, wood, leather
- Main export partners: Mercosur 62.7%; Brazil 30.9%; Argentina 29.4%; Uruguay 1.49%; Bolivia 0.93%; Chile 8.77%; United States 3.99%; Taiwan 1.99%; Russia 1.81%; Peru 1.78%; United Kingdom 1.68% (2024)
- Imports: ▲$17.49 billion (2024)
- Import goods: road vehicles, consumer goods, tobacco, petroleum products, electrical machinery, tractors, chemicals, vehicle parts
- Main import partners: China 32%; Mercosur 31.3%; Brazil 23.3%; Argentina 6.76%; Uruguay 0.74%; United States 7.02%; Chile 2.51%; India 2.5%; Singapore 2.36%; Germany 1.99%; Japan 1.74% (2024)
- FDI stock: ▲$6.235 billion (31 December 2017 est.); ▲ Abroad: $705.1 million (31 December 2017 est.)
- Current account: ▼ −$298 million (2017 est.)
- Gross external debt: ▲$17.7 billion (31 December 2017 est.)

Public finance
- Government debt: ▲19.5% of GDP (2017 est.)
- Foreign reserves: ▲$7.877 billion (31 December 2017 est.)
- Budget balance: −1.1% (of GDP) (2017 est.)
- Revenue: 5.524 billion (2017 est.)
- Spending: 5.968 billion (2017 est.)
- Credit rating: Standard & Poor's: BB (Domestic); BB (Foreign); BB+ (T&C Assessment); Outlook: Positive; Moody's: Ba2; Outlook: Stable
- All values, unless otherwise stated, are in US dollars.

The economy of Paraguay is a market economy that is highly dependent on agriculture products. In recent years, Paraguay's economy has grown as a result of increased agricultural exports, especially soybeans. Paraguay has the economic advantages of a young population and vast hydroelectric power. Its disadvantages include the few available mineral resources, and political instability. The government welcomes foreign investment.

Agriculture represents 11% of its GDP. According to official figures, 5% of landowners own 90% of the land.

== Overview ==
Paraguay is a middle-income country that changed rapidly in the 1970s and 1980s as a result of hydroelectric development, agricultural colonization, construction, and cash crop exports. Nevertheless, the country's gross domestic product (GDP) in 1986 was approximately US$3.4 billion, or roughly US$1,000 per capita, ranking Paraguay only ahead of Bolivia among countries of South America. Paraguay was the most agricultural economy of South America, and that sector influenced the performance of virtually every other sector of the economy. The over dependence on agricultural economy and low tax collections deteriorated the already wide gap wealth distribution. The extreme poverty increased from 16% to 20% during 2001 to 2012, even as the economy grew. By 2013, it has a human development index of 0.669 which is even lower than Bolivia.

The Paraguayan economic miracle of the 1970s came to a halt in 1982 because of the completion of construction at Itaipú, lower commodity prices for cotton and soybeans, and a global recession. The economy recovered in 1984 and 1985, stagnated in 1986, and continued to expand in 1987 and 1988. Despite its rapid growth, the Paraguayan economy became increasingly dependent on soybeans and cotton for exports and overall economic dynamism. These two crops, however, remained subject to external price fluctuations and local weather conditions, both of which varied considerably.

Economic growth in the post-World War II period occurred in the context of political stability characterized by authoritarian rule and patronage politics. Government economic policies deviated little from 1954 to the late 1980s, consistently favoring a strong private-enterprise economy with a large role for foreign investment. Unlike most other Latin American economies, in Paraguay import tariffs were generally low, fiscal deficits manageable, and exchange rates not overvalued. These trends faltered in the 1980s as the government took a more active part in industry, deficits rose, and the national currency was generally overvalued and devalued numerous times. Throughout the post-World War II era, Paraguay had no personal income tax, and government revenues as a percentage of GDP were among the lowest in the world.

Despite the sustained economic growth that marked the postwar period, the distribution of economic benefits was highly inequitable. Although GDP expanded rapidly in the 1970s, most economists estimated that income distribution worsened during the decade. Government spending on social services was particularly lacking. Paraguay's poverty was mostly a rural phenomenon, which increasingly involved competition for land in the eastern region near the Brazilian border, especially in the departments (administrative divisions) of Alto Paraná, Canendiyú, and Caaguazú. Nonetheless, land tenure was not generally the acute social problem it was in many developing countries.

Although Paraguay faced significant obstacles to future economic development, it displayed extraordinary potential. Paraguay contained little oil and no precious metals or sea coasts, but the country was self-sufficient in many areas and was endowed with fertile land, dense forests, and swift rivers. The process of opening up the eastern border region to economic activity and continued agricultural expansion was expected to effect rapid changes in once-isolated Paraguay. Likewise, the development of a series of hydroelectric plants along the Río Paraná linked Paraguay to its neighbors and provided it access to cherished energy resources and badly needed export revenues. Finally, road construction united different departments of Paraguay and provided the country its first access to the Atlantic Ocean via Brazil. These processes of infrastructure development, hydroelectric expansion, agricultural colonization, and a cash crop explosion allowed Paraguay by the late 1980s to begin to tap its potential

== Economic history ==
As a colony of Spain, Paraguay had substantial poverty. Paraguay was harmed by the monopolistic trade structure of the Spanish Empire and by its peripheral position among Spain's colonial possessions. Most forms of manufacturing were prohibited in Paraguay by imperial law and Paraguay had to import many goods from the metropolis. In the late 18th century, the Paraguay economy centered around the export of commodities, in particular yerba. A heavily regulated system of trade meant that yerba had to follow a complicated trade route within the Spanish empire, with multiple forms of taxation along the route.

Until the Spanish established Asunción in 1537, economic activity in Paraguay was limited to the subsistence agriculture of the Guaraní Indians. The Spanish, however, found little of economic interest in their colony, which had no precious metals and no sea coasts. The typical feudal Spanish economic system did not dominate colonial Paraguay, although the encomienda system was established. Economic relations were distinguished by the reducciones (reductions or townships) that were established by Jesuit missionaries from the early seventeenth century until the 1760s. The incorporation of Indians into these Jesuit agricultural communes laid the foundation for an agriculture-based economy that survived in the late twentieth century.

Three years after Paraguay overthrew Spanish authority and gained its independence, the country's economy was controlled by the autarkic policies of José Gaspar Rodríguez de Francia (1814–40), who closed the young nation's borders to virtually all international trade. Landlocked, isolated, and underpopulated, Paraguay structured its economy around a centrally administered agricultural sector, extensive cattle grazing, and inefficient shipbuilding and textile industries. After the demise of de Francia, government policies focused on expanding international trade and stimulating economic development. The government built several roads and authorized British construction of a railroad.

The War of the Triple Alliance (1865–70) fundamentally changed the Paraguayan economy. Economic resources were employed in and destroyed by the war effort. Paraguay was occupied by its enemies in 1870; the countryside was in virtual ruin, the labor force was decimated, peasants were pushed into the environs of Asunción from the east and south, and the modernization of the preceding three decades was undone. Sleepy, self-sufficient Paraguay, whose advances in agriculture and quality of life had been the envy of many in the Southern Cone, became the most backward nation in that subregion.

To pay its substantial war debt, Paraguay sold large tracts of land to foreigners, mostly Argentines. These large land sales established the base of the present-day land tenure system, which is characterized by a skewed distribution of land. Unlike most of its neighbors, however, Paraguay's economy was controlled not by a traditional, landed elite, but by foreign companies. Many Paraguayans grew crops and worked as wage laborers on latifundios (large landholdings) typically owned by foreigners.

The late 1800s and the early 1900s saw a slow rebuilding of ports, roads, the railroad, farms, cattle stock, and the labor force. The country was slowly being repopulated by former Brazilian soldiers who had fought in the War of the Triple Alliance, and Paraguay's government encouraged European immigration. Although few in number, British, German, Italian, and Spanish investors and farmers helped modernize the country. Argentine, Brazilian, and British companies in the late 1800s purchased some of Paraguay's best land and started the first large-scale production of agricultural goods for export. One Argentine company, whose owner had purchased 15 percent of the immense Chaco region, processed massive quantities of tannin, which were extracted from the bark of the Chaco's ubiquitous quebracho (break-axe) hardwood. Large quantities of the extract were used by the region's thriving hide industry. Another focus of large-scale agro-processing was the yerba maté bush, whose leaves produced the potent tea that is the national beverage. Tobacco farming also flourished. Beginning in 1904, foreign investment increased as a succession of Liberal Party (Partido Liberal) administrations in Paraguay maintained a staunch laissez-faire policy.

The period of steady economic recovery came to an abrupt halt in 1932 as the country entered another devastating war. This time Paraguay fought Bolivia over possession of the Chaco and rumors of oil deposits. The war ended in 1935 after extensive human losses on both sides, and war veterans led the push for general social reform. During the 1930s and 1940s, the state passed labor laws, implemented agrarian reform, and assumed a role in modernization, influenced in part by the leadership of Juan Perón in Argentina and Getúlio Vargas in Brazil. The 1940 constitution, for example, rejected the laissez-faire approach of previous Liberal governments. Reformist policies, however, did not enjoy a consensus, and by 1947 the country had entered into a civil war, which in turn initiated a period of economic chaos that lasted until the mid-1950s. During this period, Paraguay experienced the worst inflation in all of Latin America, averaging over 100 percent annually in the 1950s.

After centuries of isolation, two devastating regional wars, and a civil war, in 1954 Paraguay entered a period of prolonged political and economic stability under the authoritarian rule of Alfredo Stroessner. Stroessner's economic policies took a middle course between social reform, desarrollismo, and laissez-faire, all in the context of patronage politics. Relative to previous governments, Stroessner took a fairly active role in the economy but reserved productive activities for the local and foreign private sectors. The new government's primary economic task was to arrest the country's rampant and spiraling price instability. In 1955 Stroessner fired the country's finance minister, who was unwilling to implement reforms, and in 1956 accepted an International Monetary Fund (IMF) stabilization plan that abolished export duties, lowered import tariffs, restricted credit, devalued the currency, and implemented strict austerity measures. Although the sacrifice was high, the plan helped bring economic stability to Paraguay. Labor unions retaliated with a major strike in 1958, but the new government, now firmly established, quelled the uprising and forced many labor leaders into exile; most of them remained there in the late 1980s.

By the 1960s, the economy was on a path of modest but steady economic growth. Real GDP growth during the 1960s averaged 4.2 percent a year, under the Latin American average of 5.7 percent but well ahead of the chaotic economy of the two previous decades. As part of the United States-sponsored Alliance for Progress, the government was encouraged to expand its planning apparatus for economic development. With assistance from the Organization of American States (OAS), the Inter-American Development Bank (IDB), and the United Nations Economic Commission for Latin America (ECLA), in 1962 Paraguay established the Technical Planning Secretariat (Secretaría Técnica de Planificación—STP), the major economic planning arm of the government. By 1965 the country had its first National Economic Plan, a two-year plan for 1965–66. This was followed by another two-year plan (1967–68) and then a series of five-year plans. Five-year plans—only general policy statements—were not typically adhered to or achieved and played a minimal role in Paraguay's economic growth and development. Compared with most Latin American countries, Paraguay had a small public sector. Free enterprise dominated the economy, export promotion was favored over import substitution, agriculture continued to dominate industry, and the economy remained generally open to international trade and market mechanisms.

In an economic sense, the 1970s constituted Paraguay's miracle decade. Real GDP grew at over 8 percent a year and exceeded 10 percent from 1976 to 1981—a faster growth rate than in any other economy in Latin America. Four coinciding developments accounted for Paraguay's rapid growth in the 1970s. The first was the completion of the road from Asunción to Puerto Presidente Stroessner and to Brazilian seaports on the Atlantic, ending traditional dependence on access through Argentina and opening the east to many for the first time. The second was the signing of the Treaty of Itaipú with Brazil in 1973. Beyond the obvious economic benefits of such a massive project, Itaipú helped to create a new mood of optimism in Paraguay about what a small, isolated country could attain. The third event was land colonization, which resulted from the availability of land, the existence of economic opportunity, the increased price of crops, and the newly gained accessibility of the eastern border region. Finally, the skyrocketing price of soybeans and cotton led farmers to quadruple the number of hectares planted with these two crops. As the 1970s progressed, soybeans and cotton came to dominate the country's employment, production, and exports.

These developments shared responsibility for establishing thriving economic relations between Paraguay and the world's sixth largest economy, Brazil. Contraband trade became the dominant economic force on the border between the two countries, with Puerto Presidente Stroessner serving as the hub of such smuggling activities. Observers contended that contraband was accepted by many Paraguayan government officials, some of whom were reputed to have benefited handsomely. Many urban dwellers' shelves were stocked with contraband luxury items.

The Paraguayan government's emphasis on industrial activity increased noticeably in the 1970s. One of the most important components of the new industrial push was Law 550, also referred to as Law 550/75 or the Investment Promotion Law for Social and Economic Development. Law 550 opened Paraguay's doors even further to foreign investors by providing income-tax breaks, duty-free capital imports, and additional incentives for companies that invested in priority areas, especially the Chaco. Law 550 was successful. Investments by companies in the United States, Europe, and Japan comprised, according to some estimates, roughly a quarter of new investment. Industrial policies also encouraged the planning of more state-owned enterprises, including ones involved in producing ethanol, cement, and steel.

Much of Paraguay's rural population, however, missed out on the economic development. Back roads remained inadequate, preventing peasants from bringing produce to markets. Social services, such as schools and clinics, were severely lacking. Few people in the countryside had access to potable water, electricity, bank credit, or public transportation. As in other economies that underwent rapid growth, income distribution was believed to have worsened in Paraguay during the 1970s in both relative and absolute terms. By far the greatest problem that the rural population faced, however, was competition for land. Multinational agribusinesses, Brazilian settlers, and waves of Paraguayan colonists rapidly increased the competition for land in the eastern border region. Those peasants who lacked proper titles to the lands they occupied were pushed to more marginal areas; as a result, an increasing number of rural clashes occurred, including some with the government.

== Structure of the economy ==
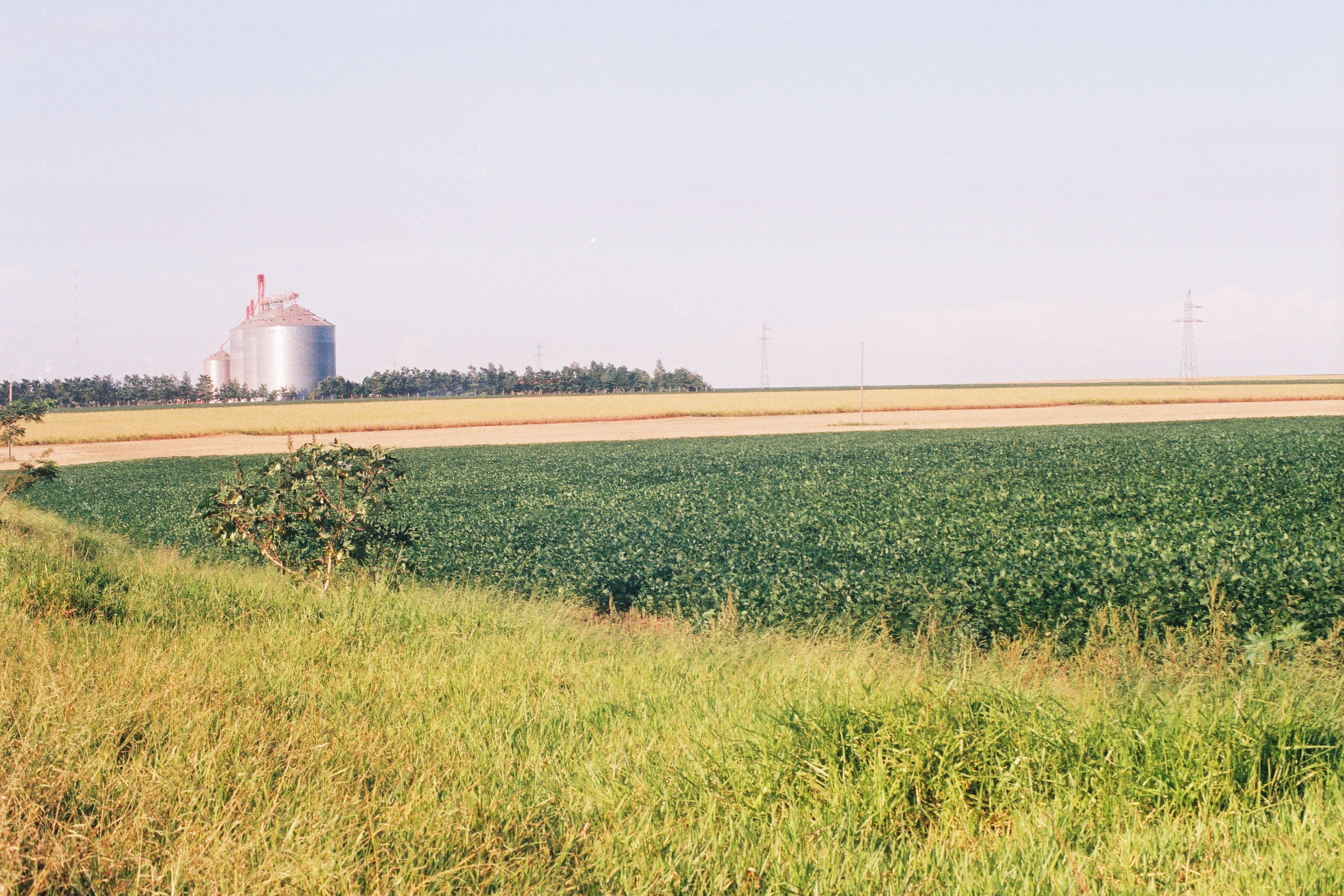
Soybeans and silos on a farm in rural Paraguay

The most important component of the Paraguayan economy is the farming sector, which contributed 27% to GDP in 2006. The participation of commerce was 20.2%, and that of other services, including government, 38.4%. Industry's part (including mining and construction) was about 20%.

After years of economic crisis, between 1999 and 2002, the Paraguayan economy grew at between 2.9 and 4.1% per year from 2003 to 2006. Inflation in 2007 reached 6.0%.

Most enterprises are small, micro and individual ones, including subsistence jobs like street vendors. Only 4% of the Paraguayan labor force works in companies with more than 50 employees.

In June 2007 external foreign exchange reserves amounted to US$2153 million, and the foreign official debt US$2154 million, close to parity. The fiscal surplus is provisionally reported as 0.5% of GDP in 2006 and 2007. Paraguay's economy (GDP) grew 5.8% in 2008, fastest growing sector being agriculture with 10.5% growth.

=== Agriculture and forestry ===
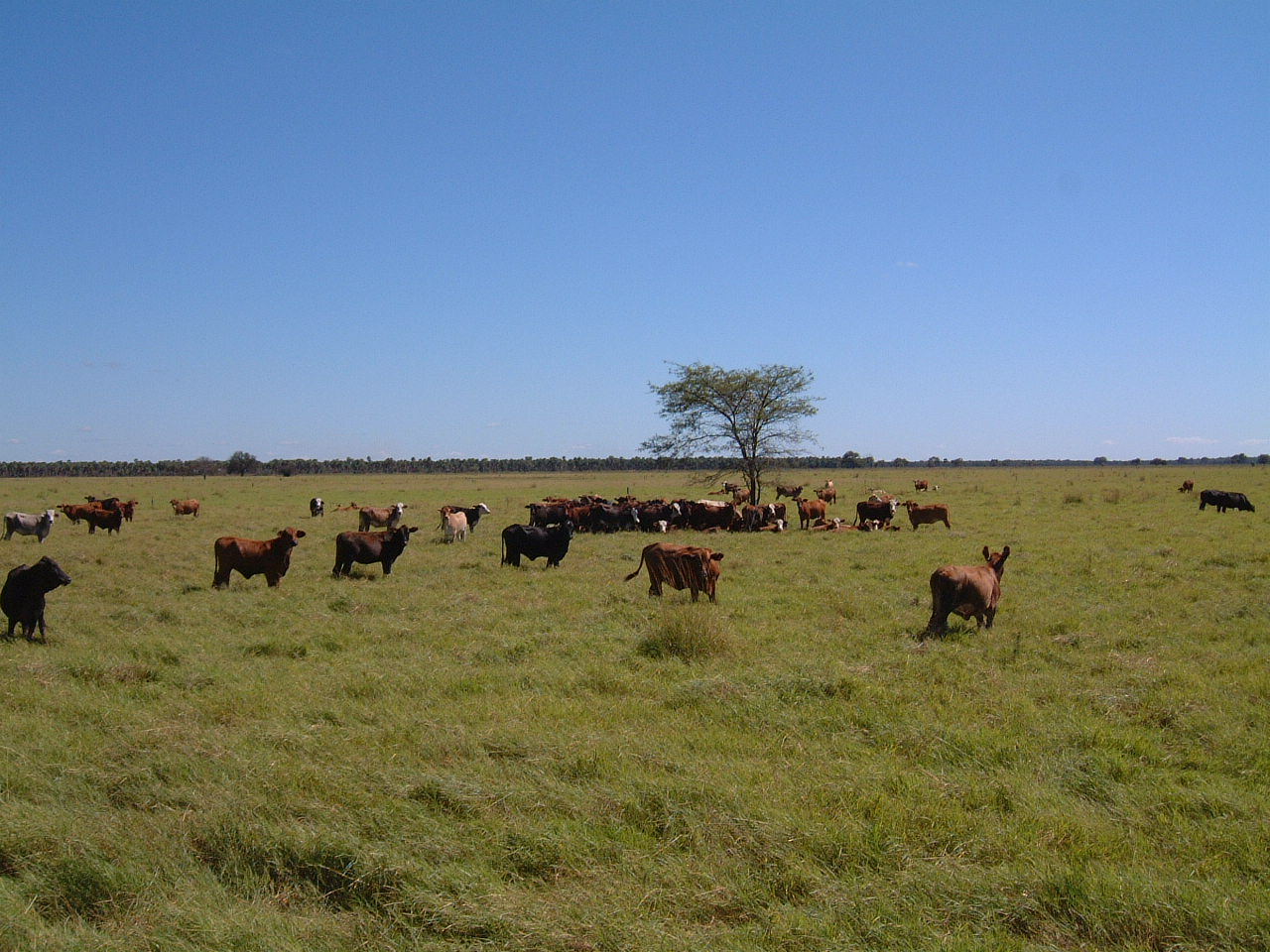
Cattle on cleared land in the Chaco

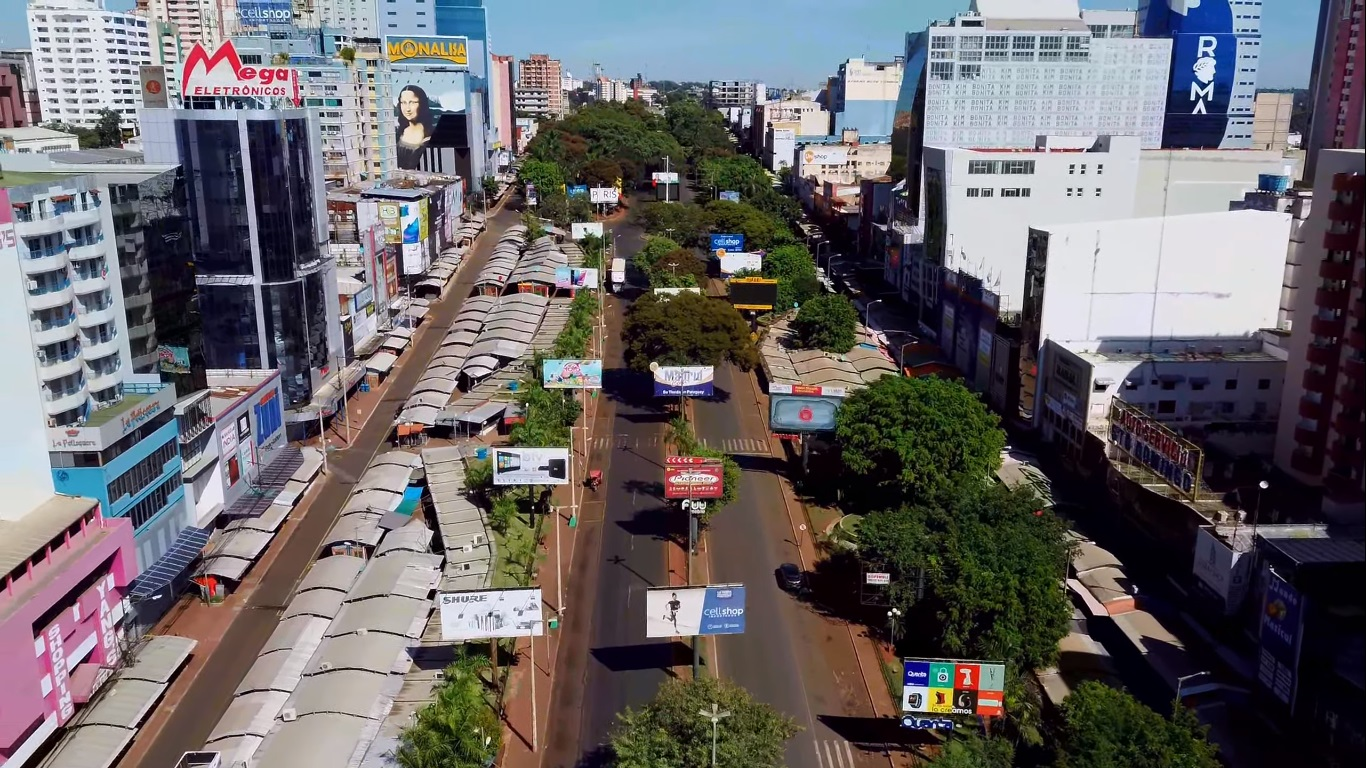
Commerce in Ciudad del Este, on the border with Brazil

Agriculture accounts for about 20 percent of Paraguay's annual gross domestic product (25 percent in 2004) and virtually all of the country's export earnings. It is Paraguay's largest and most consistent source of employment, employing about 45 percent of the working population. In addition to those engaged in the formal agricultural sector, thousands of Paraguayan families survive through subsistence farming.

Paraguay produces enough basic food to be largely self-sufficient. Corn, cassava, and wheat are the main food crops for local consumption. The global surge in grain prices 2007/2008 was a major impulse for the agricultural sector. Wheat cultivation expanded, so did rice. Most significant was the increase of soy production. In 2004 Paraguay had about 1.6 million hectares dedicated to genetically modified (GM) crops. Export value of soy and its derivates increased from US$1,25 billion in 2007 to US$2,54billion in 2008

Paraguay's eastern plains as well as the Chaco support the country's dairy and ranching industry. Behind soybeans, beef exports make up a significant part of Paraguay's agriculture sector. Additionally, Paraguay produces an adequate supply of beef, pork, and dairy products to meet domestic needs. The discovery of cases of foot-and-mouth disease in 2002 and 2003 led to a ban on Paraguayan beef in many countries. However, in 2004 Paraguay's meat production and exports rebounded. As a result of rising international prices and the recovery of important markets like Chile or Russia, Paraguay's meat exports rose to US$143 million in 2004. They reached US$353 million in 2007 and US$597 million in 2008. Presently, Paraguay has a national herd numbering between 9 and 10 million head of cattle.

In 2018, Paraguay was the 6th largest producer of soy in the world, with 11 million tons produced (behind the US, Brazil, Argentina, China and India). In the same year, the country produced 5.3 million tons of maize, and 6.1 million tons of sugarcane, ranking 21st in the world in both; this year, the country also produced 3.3 million tons of cassava, 892 thousand tons of rice, 722 thousand tons of wheat, 223 thousand tons of orange, 116 thousand tons of yerba mate, 107 thousand tons of sorghum, in addition to smaller productions of other agricultural products.

Paraguay's forests adequately meet domestic needs for lumber and fuelwood. However, logging for export, both legally and illegally, has thinned Paraguay's once abundant forests, resulting in a ban on the export of logs since the 1970s. More than 90% of the native rainforest of Paraguay's eastern half have been lost between 1975 and 2008. In the western half, the Chaco, virgin forest is lost to cattle ranching at an annual rate of more than 200.000 hectare (2008). Sustainable wood cultivation is now on the increase.

The fishing industry in Paraguay exists almost solely to meet domestic demand.

=== Industries ===
Industry, especially the manufacturing sector, historically was linked to agricultural processing until the 1970s, when the construction of hydroelectric plants and new industrial incentives began to broaden the industrial base. Industry was composed principally of manufacturing and construction. Paraguay had no real mining sector, but the manufacture of construction materials included limited mining activity. Manufacturing and construction in the economy in the late 1980s remained dependent on developments in other sectors, such as agriculture and energy, for their growth. Although industry was becoming more visible in Paraguay in the 1980s, industry's share of GDP actually declined in the 1970s and 1980s because of more rapid growth in agriculture.

Manufacturing accounted for 16.3 percent of GDP in 1986 and employed roughly 13 percent of the labor force, making Paraguay one of the least industrialized nations in Latin America. Manufactured exports, by most definitions, accounted for less than 5 percent of total exports; when semiprocessed agricultural products were included, however, that figure reached 77 percent. The growth of the country's manufacturing industries was hampered by numerous structural obstacles. These included a small internal market, limited physical infrastructure, costly access to seaports, a historical lack of energy production, and the openness of Paraguay's economy to the more industrialized economies of Brazil and Argentina. Another significant factor was the ubiquity and profitability of smuggling operations, which encouraged importing and reexporting rather than production.

Paraguay's earliest manufacturing industries processed hides and leather from its abundant cattle and tannin from quebracho trees. Small-scale manufacturing, especially textiles, flourished under the Francia dictatorship, when the nation's borders were closed. The War of the Triple Alliance, however, devastated what little industry and infrastructure the country had, causing Paraguay to enter the twentieth century as an almost completely agricultural society. Land sales to foreigners stimulated increased agricultural processing in the early twentieth century, including meat packing and the processing of flour, oilseeds, sugar, beer, and pectin extract. After the early 1900s, small-scale manufacturing in all subsectors grew at a slow, but steady pace, with some of the fastest growth occurring because of the shortages during World War II.

The government's role in promoting industry increased in the postwar era, and in 1955 the Stroessner government undertook the country's first industrial census. Over the next twenty years, the government enacted a number of industrial incentive measures, the most important of which was Law 550. Law 550 promoted export-oriented industries or those that would save foreign exchange. It also provided liberal fiscal incentives for companies to develop specific areas of the country, especially the departments of Alto Paraguay, Nueva Asunción, Chaco, and Boquerón. Incentives for business were related mostly to import-duty exemptions, but they included a variety of tax breaks and placed no restrictions on foreign ownership. Approximately one-fourth of all new manufacturing investment from 1975 to 1985 was registered under Law 550. Most foreign investments originated from Brazil, West Germany, the United States, Portugal, and Argentina in that order of importance. The dynamic processes of agricultural colonization and hydroelectric development, combined with such attractive industrial incentives, caused manufacturing to grow at an unprecedented rate in the late 1970s and early 1980s.

Unlike many other Latin American governments, which followed an import-substitution industrial policy, the Paraguayan government had played a minimalist role in the economy through most of the postwar era, curtailing import tariffs and maintaining a realistic exchange rate. In the 1980s, however, Paraguay's exchange rate became overvalued and several state-owned heavy industry plants became operational.

In the late 1980s, the major subsectors of manufacturing were food, beverages, and tobacco; textiles, clothing, leather, and shoes; wood and related products; and chemicals, petroleum, and plastics. Despite some increases in heavy industry in the economy during the 1970s and 1980s, Paraguayan industry was generally small-scale. Manufacturing production remained focused on consumer goods, and capital goods comprised under 5 percent of industrial output. In fact, in the 1980s Paraguay did not contain even one of Latin America's 1,000 largest companies, at least some of which were found in most other countries in the region. Virtually every subsector of Paraguay's manufacturing was characterized by numerous small- to medium-sized firms and a few large firms, which often were foreign owned. Most companies operated well below their capacity.

The food, beverages, and tobacco subsector has been the core manufacturing activity throughout Paraguay's history. In the late 1980s, this subsector continued to dominate, accounting for about 45 percent of industrial activity, depending on agricultural output in a given year. Agro-processing involved a large number of small, inefficient, and often family-run firms as well as a small number of large, efficient, and usually foreign-owned firms. The larger firms produced only the most lucrative items, such as oilseeds, meats, and various beverages, often for export. Some of the most common small-scale producers manufactured milled items, baked goods, sugar and molasses, dairy products, candy, manioc flour, vinegar, coffee, and tobacco. Along with raw agricultural produce, processed and semiprocessed food generated nearly all of the country's exports in the late 1980s. But, as with other manufacturing subsectors, the profitability of the food subsector often was impaired by contraband items from Brazil and Argentina, such as flour, meat, or dairy products. Paraguayan goods crossed borders unofficially, as well, thus lowering official exports.

The second most important manufacturing activity also relied on agricultural inputs for its base. Utilizing Paraguay's rich endowment of hardwood trees, the wood subsector represented about 15 percent of all industrial activity and contributed over 8 percent of exports in the 1980s. The most voluminous wood export was lumber, which was produced by hundreds of small sawmills throughout the central and eastern border regions. In addition to saw wood, mills also produced a variety of milled wood, plywood, chipboard, and parquet flooring. Although the country cut and processed only a fraction of its hundreds of species, Paraguayan wood was known for its quality. The country also contained several small paper companies and one large paper and cardboard factory located at Villeta.

Textiles, clothing, leather, and shoes comprised the third largest manufacturing subsector. These industries were traditional, grounded in the nation's abundance of inputs like cotton fibers, cattle hides, and tannin extract. The subsector accounted for about 10 percent of all manufacturing. The textile industry performed spinning, weaving, and dyeing operations and produced finished fabrics that amounted to over 100 million tons in 1986. Most fabrics were derived from cotton fibers, but a growing number of synthetic and wool fibers also were produced. Textile production provided inputs to approximately sixty clothing firms that operated under capacity and were generally inefficient. As with so many other manufacturers, clothing companies met stiff competition from widespread unregistered imports, which often originated in Asia and typically entered across the Brazilian border. The leather industry was characterized by 200 or so small tanneries dotting the Paraguayan countryside. In addition, many medium and two large tanneries fashioned leather goods. The leather industry operated at only about 40 percent of capacity, however. The shoe industry comprised a few hundred small workshops and a dozen or so medium sized firms, which produced some 5 million pairs of leather and synthetic shoes a year.

The processing of petroleum, chemicals, and plastics repeated an increasing activity. In the late 1980s, this subsector represented less than 5 percent of industrial activity, but its share of manufacturing output was expanding because of the growth of heavy industry in Paraguay, especially industry related to the energy sector. The country also produced fertilizers, industrial gases, tanning chemicals, varnishes, and detergents. In 1987 a group of Japanese investors was considering the construction of a new fertilizer plant with a 70,000-ton capacity per year. Since the early 1980s, ethanol was being produced in large quantities, and the government was considering producing methanol. Also processed were paints, soaps, candles, perfumes, and pharmaceuticals. One of Paraguay's fastest growing industries was the new, relatively modern plastics subsector, which supplied a wide variety of goods to the local market.

The industrial sector produces about 25 percent of Paraguay's gross domestic product (GDP) and employs about 31 percent of the labor force. Output grew by 2.9 percent in 2004, after five years of declining production. Traditionally an agricultural economy, Paraguay is showing some signs of long-term industrial growth. The pharmaceutical industry is quickly supplanting foreign suppliers in meeting the country's drug needs. Paraguayan companies now meet 70 percent of domestic consumption and also have begun exporting drugs. Strong growth also is evident in the production of edible oils, garments, organic sugar, meat processing, and steel. Nevertheless, capital for further investment in the industrial sector of the economy is scarce. Following the revelation of widespread financial corruption in the 1990s, the government is still working to improve credit options for Paraguayan businesses.

In 2003 manufacturing made up 13.6 percent of the GDP, and the sector employed about 11 percent of the working population in 2000. Paraguay's primary manufacturing focus is on food and beverages. Wood products, paper products, hides and furs, and non-metallic mineral products also contribute to manufacturing totals. Steady growth in the manufacturing GDP during the 1990s (1.2 percent annually) laid the foundation for 2002 and 2003, when the annual growth rate rose to 2.5 percent.

==== Mining and minerals ====
Unlike many South American countries, Paraguay has few mineral resources and very little history of mining success. Foreign companies have explored Paraguay in recent years, searching for overlooked mineral deposits. Small extraction projects exist, seeking lime, clay, and the raw materials necessary to make cement, but the country's iron and steel manufacturers must import raw materials from neighboring countries.

In 2010 CIC Resources Inc., the same company that discovered the copper deposits in Chile, claims to have discovered 21 billion metric tons of titanium, which could be the biggest titanium deposit in the world, in Alto Parana near frontier with Brazil.

=== Energy ===
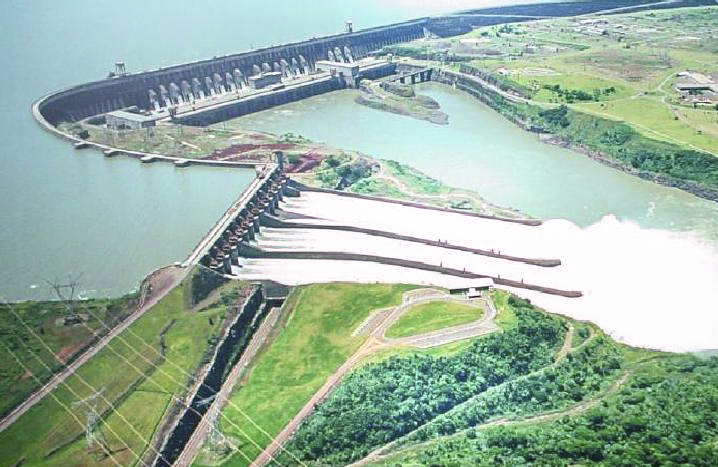
The Itaipú Dam; a hydroelectric dam on the Paraná River

Paraguay relies almost solely on hydroelectric power to meet its energy needs. The Itaipú Dam, completed in 1984, has the world's second largest power-generating capacity: 13.3 gigawatts. The dam is located on the Paraguay River, and Paraguay and Brazil evenly share the ownership, operation, and electricity generated. Additionally, Paraguay co-owns another major hydropower plant, Yacyretá, with Argentina. Paraguay uses only a small portion of the energy it generates through Itaipú and Yacyretá. In 2002 Paraguay generated more than 48 billion kilowatt-hours of energy. It consumed only 2.5 billion kilowatt-hours while exporting 45.9 billion kilowatt-hours. Paraguay will have even more hydroelectricity to export when planned new turbines are installed at Itaipú and the Yacyretá dam is fully completed. In 2007 electricity production rose to 70 TWh, and exports reached 64 TWh which put Paraguay in second place worldwide as an exporter of electrical power (And in the first place as a net exporter since France, the Number one exporter in the World with 67 TWh, also imports 10 TWh, while Paraguay does not import any).

Paraguay has no oil reserves; it relies on imported oil to meet its limited need for oil-produced energy. The Paraguayan government owns Petróleos Paraguayos, which is responsible for all distribution of oil products. The state accepts bids from international oil companies, selecting a few companies annually to meet the country's demand. Presently, Paraguay does not produce or consume natural gas, but consumes LPG imported mainly from Argentina.

=== Services ===
The services sector made up nearly 50 percent of Paraguay's gross domestic product in 2004 and employed about 19 percent of Paraguay's working population. The importation of goods, especially from Argentina and Brazil, for sale and illegal reexportation creates service industry jobs. The services sector had a moderate growth rate of 0.9 percent from 1990 to 2003. The sector decreased by 7.8 percent in 2002, before rebounding in 2003 with a 1.6 percent growth rate. Instability in the economy and a large black market have hampered development of the formal services sector in Paraguay.

==== Banking and finance ====
Paraguay's banking and financial services industry is still recovering from the liquidity crisis of 1995, when news of widespread corruption resulted in the closure of several significant banks. Reform efforts spurred by the International Monetary Fund (IMF) and World Bank helped restore some credibility to Paraguay's banking industry. Still, a paucity of credit options hinders the overall economy. Paraguay has a long history as a money-laundering center. The government has taken steps to curb the problem, but enforcement of anti-laundering legislation remains inconsistent.

Foreign companies either partially or wholly own most banks and financial institutions in Paraguay. Paraguayan banks hold less than 10 percent of deposits. Of the 16 banks operating in Paraguay in 2003, 50 percent were wholly foreign-owned and 25 percent were partially owned by foreign companies. Paraguay's Central Bank exists to stabilize the financial sector, making sure that another run on banks, such as the one that occurred in 1995, does not recur. The Superintendencia de Bancos regulates the banking system, monitoring the percentage of non-performing loans in the banking system. Bank deposits rose significantly in 2004, along with the percentage of local currency in total deposits. Local currency deposits increased by 26 percent in 2004, a sign that Paraguayans are gaining confidence in the stability of Paraguayan currency. In another promising development, interest rates dropped dramatically in 2004, from 50 percent in 2003 to 27 percent in 2004.

Paraguay's regulated market for listed shares, the Bolsa de Valores y Productos de Asunción, began trading in October 1993. The tradition of family-owned companies and economic instability kept investment low throughout the 1990s. The value of shares on the Asunción stock exchange rose by 390 percent in 2004, reaching US$17.5 million.

==== Education ====
During Alfredo Stroessner Mattiauda’s presidency (1954–89), education initiatives took a backseat to economic concerns and the task of controlling political adversaries, and teacher salaries fell to extremely low levels. The constitution of 1992 attempted to remedy the long neglect of education. Article 85 of the constitution mandates that 20% of the government budget be designated for educational expenditures. This measure, however, has proven to be impractical and has been largely ignored.

Nevertheless, democratization has been accompanied by a gradual improvement in the education system. Spending on education has increased, reaching 4.7 percent of gross domestic product in 2000, up from 1.7 percent in 1989. Much of the increased funding went to raise teacher salaries and update curricula. Students are required to attend school from ages seven to 13, and surveys indicate that Paraguay has a net primary school attendance rate of 92 percent. Public education is free to all, but dropout rates remain high.

Until the 1990s, the state Universidad Nacional de Asunción and the Universidad Católica Nuestra Señora de la Asunción served Paraguay’s entire population. As part of the educational reforms of the 1990s, the government created 10 new universities. In 2003 Paraguay’s national military academy admitted female cadets for the first time, opening another door for women pursuing education.

The Human Rights Measurement Initiative (HRMI) finds that Paraguay is fulfilling only 70.7% of what it should be fulfilling for the right to education based on the country's level of income. HRMI breaks down the right to education by looking at the rights to both primary education and secondary education. While taking into consideration Paraguay's income level, the nation is achieving 73.0% of what should be possible based on its resources (income) for primary education and only 68.4% for secondary education.

==== Healthcare ====
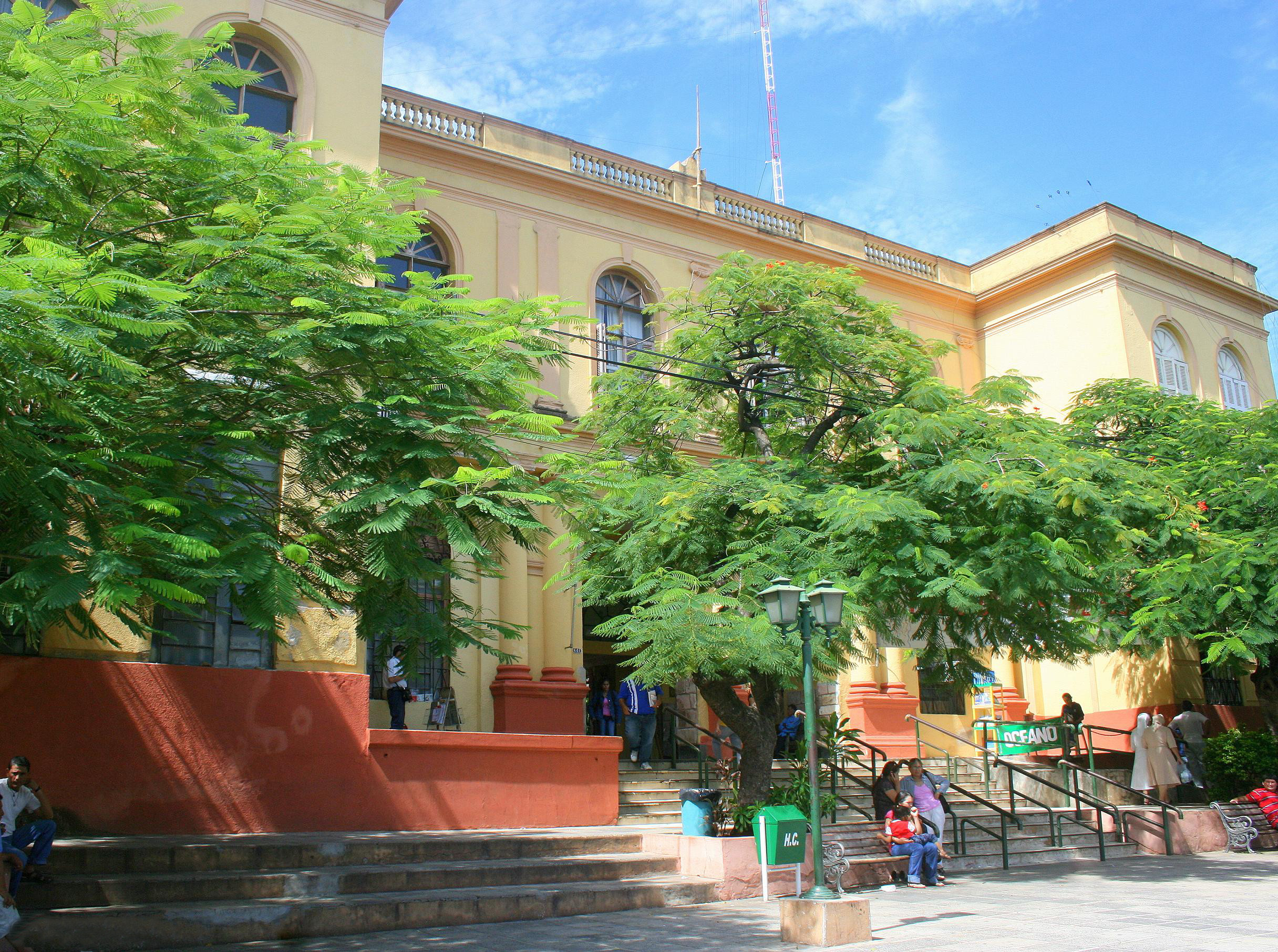
Hospital in Paraguay

Development of life expectancy

In terms of major health indicators, health in Paraguay ranks near the median among South American countries. In 2003 Paraguay had a child mortality rate of 59 deaths per 2000 children, ranking it behind Argentina, Colombia, and Uruguay but ahead of Brazil and Bolivia. The health of Paraguayans living outside urban areas is generally worse than those residing in cities. Many preventable diseases, such as Chagas disease, run rampant in rural regions. Parasitic and respiratory diseases, which could be controlled with proper medical treatment, drag down Paraguay's overall health. In general, malnutrition, lack of proper health care, and poor sanitation are the root of many health problems in Paraguay.

Health care funding from the national government increased gradually throughout the 1980s and 1990s. Spending on health care rose to 1.7 percent of the gross domestic product (GDP) in 2000, nearly triple the 0.6 percent of GDP spent in 1989. But during the past decade, improvement in health care has slowed. Paraguay spends less per capita (US$13−20 per year) than most other Latin American countries. A 2001 survey indicated that 27 percent of the population still had no access to medical care, public or private. Private health insurance is very limited, with pre-paid plans making up only 11 percent of private expenditures on health care. Thus, most of the money spent on private health care (about 88 percent) is on a fee-for-service basis, effectively preventing the poor population from seeing private doctors. According to recent estimates, Paraguay has about 117 physicians and 20 nurses per 100,000 population.

In 2003 the prevalence rate of human immunodeficiency virus/acquired immune deficiency syndrome (HIV/AIDS) in Paraguay was estimated at 0.5 percent of the population, and officials reported 600 deaths from AIDS. The United Nations cautions that although the prevalence rate in Paraguay remains low, HIV/AIDS is increasing among stigmatized population groups. Transmission of the virus is primarily through sexual contact. According to 2004 estimates, nearly 15,000 Paraguayans were infected with HIV/AIDS.

The Human Rights Measurement Initiative finds that Paraguay is fulfilling 88.5% of what it should be fulfilling for the right to health based on its level of income. When looking at the right to health with respect to children, Paraguay achieves 94.5% of what is expected based on its current income. In regards to the right to health amongst the adult population, the country achieves 88.1% of what is expected based on the nation's level of income. Paraguay falls into the "bad" category when evaluating the right to reproductive health because the nation is fulfilling only 83.0% of what the nation is expected to achieve based on the resources (income) it has available.

==== Media and communications ====
There are five national newspapers and a larger number of local publications. There are five Paraguayan TV stations. Additionally, essential international stations can be received by cable in the main urban areas.

The fixed line network is controlled by the state-owned COPACO Company. The cell phone network is open to private operators. There are four competing mobile phone operators in Paraguay. During the last few years mobile phone coverage of the population has been far more extensive than fixed line coverage.

==== Tourism ====
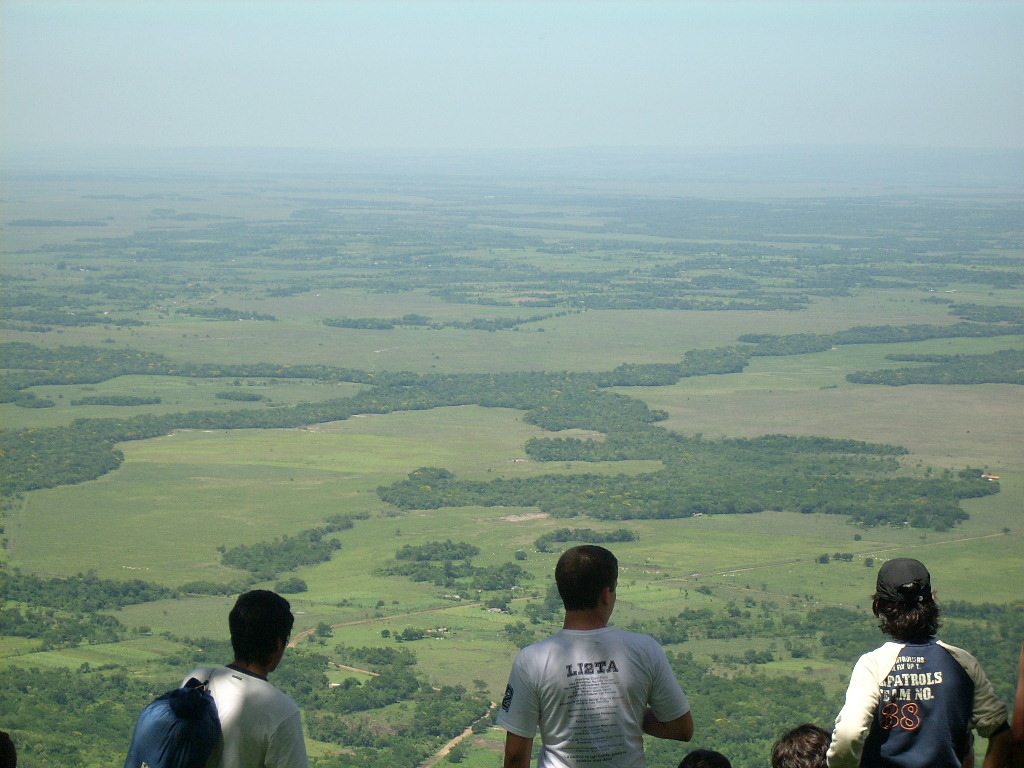
Tourism

Paraguay has a small tourism industry. Total tourism receipts declined annually from 2000 through 2002. In 2003 Paraguay's hotel occupancy rate was 38 percent. It increased by 15 percent in 2004. Small gains in tourism have come from business rather than leisure travellers. For many years, Paraguay served as a central market for trafficable, duty-free goods. However, crackdowns by the governments of Brazil and Argentina have stemmed the flow of shoppers travelling to Paraguay looking for trafficable items.

==== Transport ====
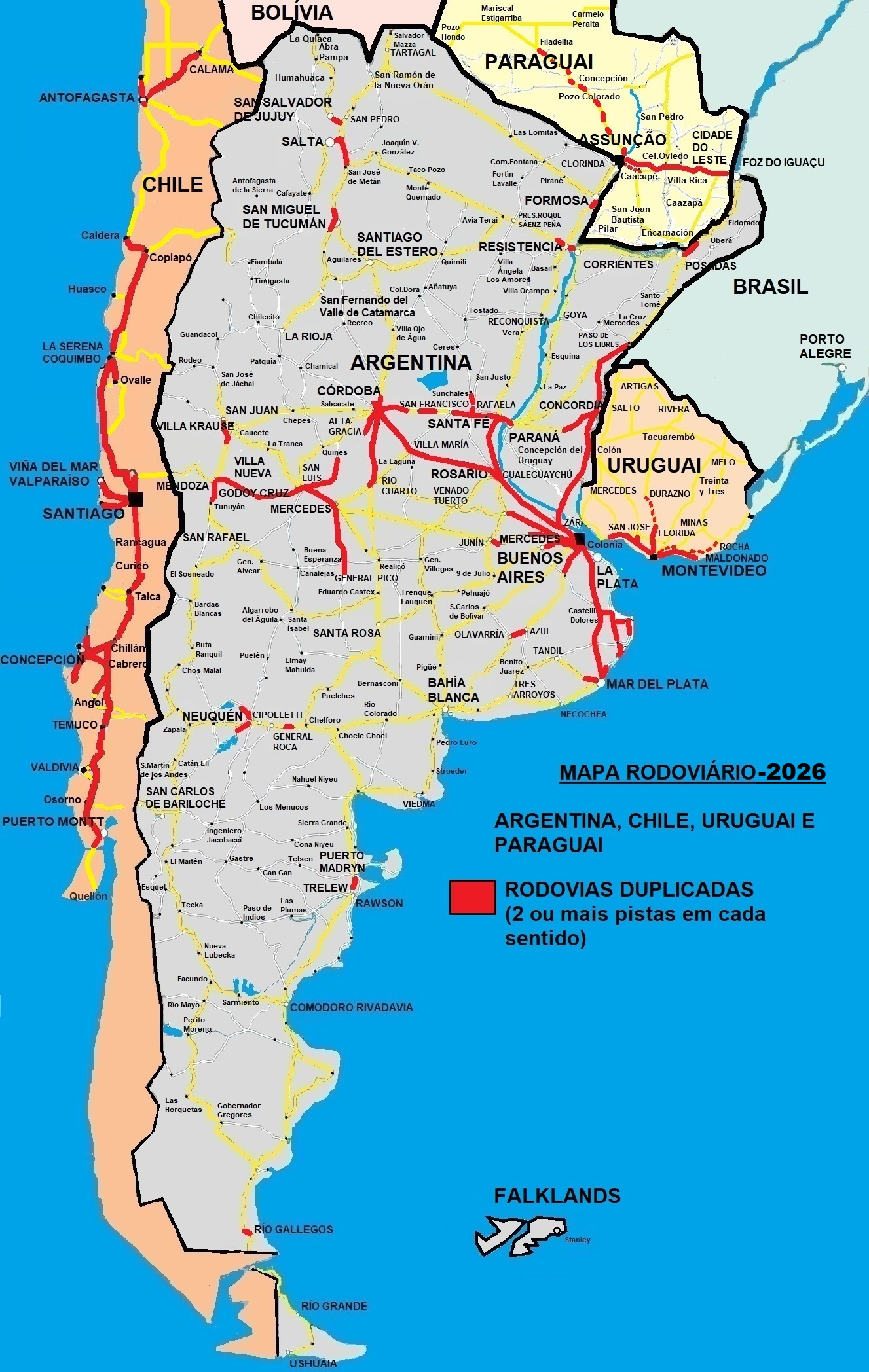
Road system in South America, with divided highways highlighted in red.

The Paraguayan road network includes 60,000 inter-urban roads of which 54,500 are unpaved. The density of the road network is higher in the oriental region, and lower in the Chaco area. However, in 2007 a paved connection to the Bolivian border was completed across the Chaco region.

The Paraguay-Paraná waterway constitutes an essential route for the transport of exported and imported goods.

The railway which connects Asunción to Encarnación actually does not operate, but there is still a connection between Encarnación and Posadas (Argentina) for the transport of agricultural goods.

Paraguay has two international airports, Silvio Pettirossi International Airport, in Asunción, and Guarani International Airport, in Ciudad del Este, and several secondary airports in other parts of the country.

=== Water supply and sanitation ===

Despite many years of concerted efforts and achievements in expanding coverage and improving service sustainability, many issues remain to be addressed in the water and sanitation sector. Key issues include: (i) a low level of coverage for both water and sanitation, in particular in rural areas; (ii) a low level of cost recovery, despite a legal obligation for tariffs to recover costs; and (iii) an institutional framework that is only partially effective.

== Labor ==
Paraguay's formal labour force was estimated to total about 2.7 million workers in 2004. About 45 percent worked in the agricultural sector, 31 percent in the industrial sector, and 19 percent in the services sector. Unemployment was estimated at 15 percent. Paraguay's constitution guarantees the right of workers to unionize and bargain collectively. About 15 percent of workers are members of one of Paraguay's 1,600 unions. Strikes are legal and not uncommon.

The 2001 census found that 5 percent of Paraguay's workforce was under the age of 14. Although Paraguay ratified the International Labour Organization's Minimum Age Convention in 2004, child labour continues to be prevalent. Nearly 14 percent of children between the ages of 5 and 17 are employed, many in poor conditions and for negligible pay. The government has mandated a minimum wage of approximately US$158 per month for private-sector employees. Government employees have no minimum wage. The standard workweek is 48 hours. In 2004 Paraguay's unemployment rate stood at 15 percent.

== Currency, exchange rate, and inflation ==
Paraguay's currency is the guarani (PYG). In mid-October 2005, US$1 equaled about PYG6155.

Price inflation fell dramatically between 2003 and 2004, from 14.2 percent to a 30-year low of 4.3 percent. President's Duarte's economic reforms and austerity programs have produced results more rapidly than many expected. As of 2005, experts forecast that the inflation rate in Paraguay likely would rise in coming years but has remained below 10 percent.

== Foreign economic relations ==
Exports of Paraguay by product category (2019) Chemical products Transportation Machines Mineral products Plastics and rubbers Metals Foodstuffs Precious metals Textiles Instruments Animal products Vegetable products Paper goods Footwear and headwear Miscellaneous Stone and glass Wood products Animal and vegetable bi-products Animal hides Arts and antiques Weapons

Paraguay is a member of the Common Market of the South (Mercado Común del Sur or Mercosur). Most of Paraguay's trade takes place with Uruguay, Brazil and Argentina. In 2002 Paraguay conducted more than US$400 million in trade with Argentina and nearly US$800 million with Brazil. Paraguay is also a member of the Inter-American Development Bank, Latin American Integration Association, and Latin American Economic System and a signatory to the agreement creating the South American Community of Nations. In 2004 Paraguay signed an energy cooperation agreement with Venezuela to purchase oil and petroleum. Venezuela agreed to concessional financing that allowed Paraguay to pay over a 15-year period at a nominal interest rate.

Imports totaled US$3.3 billion in 2004. Principal import commodities included automobiles, chemical products, consumer goods, tobacco, petroleum, and machinery. Brazil was the leading source of imports to Paraguay (24.3 percent), followed by the United States (22.3 percent), Argentina (16.2 percent), China (9.9 percent), and Hong Kong (5 percent). Experts note that import statistics are difficult to confirm for Paraguay because as much as half of all imports are illegally re-exported to Argentina or Brazil. Imports from Mercosur countries continue to rise, up to 57 percent in 2003.

Paraguay's export revenues totaled about US$2.9 billion in 2004. Agricultural commodities continue to drive Paraguay's export totals. Soybeans are particularly vital, accounting for 35 percent of total export revenues in 2003. Other agricultural cash crops include cotton, sugarcane, cassava, sunflowers, wheat, and corn. Other significant exports include feed, meat, edible oils, electricity, wood, and leather. Even as Paraguayan export revenue has fluctuated, Brazil remained Paraguay's principal export destination (27.8 percent in 2004), followed by Uruguay (15.9 percent), Italy (7.1 percent), Switzerland (5.6 percent), Argentina (4.3 percent), and the Netherlands (4.2 percent). In 2003 nearly 60 percent of Paraguayan exports went to Mercosur countries.

Paraguay had a negative trade balance of about US$400 million in 2004. Higher earnings from soybeans and cotton could not offset the surge in imported consumer goods and petroleum products.

After years of negative balances, Paraguay achieved a positive balance of payments totaling US$234 million in 2003. In 2004, however, the current account had an estimated deficit of US$35.1 million.

Paraguay has a sustainable debt level according to the International Monetary Fund (IMF). External debt totaled about US$3.4 billion in 2004, low compared to most Latin American countries. Continued reductions in Paraguay's debt to gross domestic product ratio are expected in coming years. Paraguay paid US$412 million in debt service to the IMF in 2004.

Foreign investment in Paraguay nearly disappeared in 2002. After direct foreign investment of US$84 million in 2001, only US$9 million in investment came from abroad in 2002. This drop was largely the result of the financial crisis in Argentina and the banking collapse in Paraguay. Direct foreign investment rebounded in 2003, reaching US$90.8 million for the year.

Paraguay has depended on the International Monetary Fund (IMF) and World Bank for economic development assistance. The World Bank has promised Paraguay assistance totaling US$325 million between 2003 and 2007. Projects currently underway in Paraguay aim to improve education, transportation, and rural development.

== Statistics ==
The following table shows the main economic indicators in 1980–2019 (with FMI estimates for 2020-2026).

Year	GDP (in Bil. US$PPP)	GDP per capita (in US$ PPP)	GDP (in Bil. US$nominal)	GDP per capita (in US$ nominal)	GDP growth (real)	Inflation rate (in Percent)	Unemployment (in Percent)	Government debt (in % of GDP)
1980	11.1	3,536.7	4.1	1,299.7	11.7%	22.5%	n/a	n/a
1981	▲13.3	▲4,103.4	▲5.2	▲1,608.5	▲9.2%	▲13.8%	n/a	n/a
1982	▲13.9	▲4,171.1	▲5.5	▲1,636.5	▼-1.4%	▲5.4%	n/a	n/a
1983	▲14.0	▼4,080.4	▲6.1	▲1,763.0	▼-3.0%	▲12.8%	8.3%	n/a
1984	▲15.0	▲4,220.3	▼4.9	▼1,390.9	▲2.8%	▲20.9%	▼7.3%	n/a
1985	▲16.0	▲4,390.9	▼4.2	▼1,154.1	▲3.9%	▲24.8%	▼5.1%	n/a
1986	▲16.4	▼4,352.9	▲5.0	▲1,335.8	▲0.3%	▲31.7%	▲6.1%	n/a
1987	▲17.5	▲4,499.5	▼4.2	▼1,084.7	▲4.1%	▲21.7%	▼5.5%	n/a
1988	▲19.2	▲4,780.5	▲5.6	▲1,392.4	▲5.9%	▲22.6%	▼4.7%	n/a
1989	▲21.1	▲5,095.2	▼4.0	▼977.8	▲5.8%	▲25.6%	▲6.1%	n/a
1990	▲22.8	▲5,503.7	▲4.9	▲1,185.3	▲4.1%	▲38.2%	▲6.6%	▼67.0%
1991	▲24.4	▲5,529.7	▲7.0	▲1,585.2	▲3.5%	▲24.3%	▼5.1%	▼49.4%
1992	▲25.3	▲5,636.6	▲7.2	▲1,592.1	▲1.7%	▲15.1%	▲5.3%	▼34.4%
1993	▲27.2	▲5,933.9	7.2	▼1,580.2	▲4.9%	▲18.3%	▼5.1%	▼26.6%
1994	▲29.3	▲6,255.3	▲7.9	▲1,681.4	▲5.3%	▲20.6%	▼4.4%	▼18.7%
1995	▲31.9	▲6,685.7	▲9.1	▲1,897.1	▲6.8%	▲13.4%	▼3.3%	▼17.6%
1996	▲33.0	▲6,777.0	▲9.8	▲2,008.2	▲1.6%	▲9.8%	▲8.2%	▼16.8%
1997	▲35.0	▲7,042.6	▲10.0	▼2,003.6	▲4.2%	▲7.0%	▼5.0%	▲18.0%
1998	▲35.4	▼6,984.2	▼9.3	▼1,824.6	▲0.1%	▲11.6%	▲5.8%	▲22.1%
1999	▲35.5	▼6,848.5	▼8.8	▼1,706.4	▼-1.4%	▲6.8%	▲6.8%	▲32.0%
2000	▼35.4	▼6,702.7	▲8.9	▼1,675.8	▼-2.3%	▲9.0%	▲7.3%	▲33.6%
2001	▲35.9	▼6,665.8	▼8.5	▼1,577.7	▼-0.8%	▲7.3%	▲7.6%	▲40.3%
2002	▲36.5	▼6,646.9	▼7.2	▼1,312.1	▼0.0%	▲10.5%	▲10.8%	▲54.5%
2003	▲38.7	▲6,937.8	▲7.7	▲1,377.5	▲4.3%	▲14.2%	▼8.1%	▼40.3%
2004	▲41.4	▲7,285.2	▲9.6	▲1,693.9	▲4.1%	▲4.3%	▼7.3%	▼30.3%
2005	▲43.6	▲7,542.5	▲10.7	▲1,857.8	▲2.1%	▲6.8%	▼5.8%	▼24.1%
2006	▲47.1	▲8,009.1	▲13.4	▲2,285.1	▲4.8%	▲9.6%	▲6.7%	▼18.2%
2007	▲51.0	▲8,528.9	▲17.9	▲2,988.7	▲5.4%	▲8.1%	▼5.6%	▼14.9%
2008	▲55.3	▲9,099.8	▲24.6	▲4,047.7	▲6.4%	▲10.2%	▲5.7%	▼14.5%
2009	▲55.5	▼9,001.7	▼22.3	▼3,621.7	▼-0.3%	▲2.6%	▲6.4%	▼13.7%
2010	▲62.4	▲9,964.5	▲27.1	▲4,326.2	▲11.1%	▲4.7%	▼5.7%	▼12.1%
2011	▲66.4	▲10,442.6	▲33.7	▲5,295.4	▲4.2%	▲8.3%	▼5.6%	▼10.3%
2012	▼64.4	▼9,960.8	▼33.3	▼5,155.2	▼-0.5%	▲3.7%	▼4.6%	▲12.3%
2013	▲72.2	▲11,004.3	▲38.7	▲5,905.7	▲8.4%	▲2.7%	▲5.0%	▲13.5%
2014	▲75.4	▲11,326.6	▲40.3	▲6,050.1	▲4.9%	▲5.0%	▲6.0%	▲15.6%
2015	▲76.7	▲11,357.7	▼36.2	▼5,353.1	▲3.1%	▲3.1%	▼5.4%	▲18.6%
2016	▲81.5	▲11,895.4	▼36.1	▼5,259.9	▲4.3%	▲4.1%	▲6.0%	▲19.4%
2017	▲86.5	▲12,437.5	▲39.0	▲5,609.8	▲5.0%	▲3.6%	▲6.1%	▲19.8%
2018	▲91.5	▲12,978.2	▲40.4	▲5,725.9	▲3.4%	▲4.0%	▲6.2%	▲22.2%
2019	▲93.1	▲13,021.8	▼38.1	▼5,333.0	▼0.0%	▲2.8%	▼6.1%	▲25.6%
2020	▲93.4	▼12,881.0	▼35.9	▼4,946.5	▼-0.9%	▲1.8%	▲6.6%	▲34.8%
2021	▲98.9	▲13,454.2	▲37.8	▲5,145.6	▲4.0%	▲2.7%	▼6.1%	▲35.7%
2022	▲105.2	▲14,115.9	▲40.2	▲5,391.0	▲4.0%	▲3.2%	▼5.9%	▲36.5%
2023	▲111.9	▲14,811.6	▲43.0	▲5,685.5	▲4.0%	▲3.2%	5.9%	▼36.4%
2024	▲118.2	▲15,441.5	▲45.4	▲5,935.3	▲3.5%	▲3.2%	5.9%	▼36.2%
2025	▲124.8	▲16,078.0	▲47.9	▲6,178.1	▲3.5%	▲3.2%	5.9%	▼35.8%
2026	▲131.6	▲16,726.1	▲50.6	▲6,430.6	▲3.5%	▲3.2%	5.9%	▼35.2%

GDP - composition by sector:

- Agriculture: 11.4%
- Industry: 33.5%
- Services: 47.5%
- Taxes: 7.6% (2022)

Labor force: 3.428 million (2017 est.)

Labor force - by occupation:

- agriculture: 26.5%
- industry: 18.5%
- services: 55% (2008 est.)

Unemployment rate: 6.5% (2017 est.)

Population below poverty line: 22.2% (2015 est.)

Household income or consumption by percentage share:

- lowest 10%: 1.5%
- highest 10%: 37.6% (2015)

Distribution of family income - Gini index: 51.7 (2015)

Inflation rate (consumer prices): 3.6% (2017 est.)

Investment (gross fixed): 21.2% of GDP (2005 est.)

Budget:

- revenues: $5.366 billion
- expenditures: $5.876 billion, including capital expenditures of $700 million (2017 est.)

Public debt: 25.6% of GDP (2017 est.)

Agriculture - products: cotton, sugarcane, soybeans, corn, wheat, tobacco, cassava (tapioca), fruits, vegetables; beef, pork, eggs, milk; timber

Industries: sugar, cement, textiles, beverages, wood products, steel, metallurgic, electric power

Industrial production growth rate: 6% (2017 est.)

Electricity:

- production: 51.29 billion kWh (2003)
- consumption: 3.528 billion kWh (2003)
- exports: 44.17 billion kWh (2003)
- imports: 0 kWh (2003)

Electricity - production by source:

- fossil fuel: 0%
- hydro: 99.9%
- nuclear: 0%
- other: 0.1% (2001)

Oil:

- production: 0 bbl/d (0 m^{3}/d) (2003 est.)
- consumption: 25,000 bbl/d (4,000 m^{3}/d) (2003 est.)
- exports: NA (2001)
- imports: NA (2001)

Current account balance: $543 million (2017 est.)

Exports: $11.53 billion f.o.b. (2017 est.)

Exports - partners: Brazil 31.9%, Argentina 15.9%, Chile 6.9%, Russia 5.9% (2017)

Imports: $10.37 billion f.o.b. (2017 est.)

Imports - partners: China 31.3%, Brazil 23.4%, Argentina 12.9%, US 7.4% (2017)

Reserves of foreign exchange and gold: $7.504 billion (2017 est.)

Debt - external: $17.35 billion (2017 est.)

Economic aid - recipient: NA

Currency: 1 guarani (G) = 100 centimos

Exchange rates: guarani (G) per US$ - 5,628.1 (2017) 4,555.00 (2011), 6,158.47 (2005), 5,974.6 (2004), 6,424.34 (2003), 5,716.26 (2002), 4,105.92 (2001), 3,332.0 (January 2000), 3,119.1 (1999), 2,726.5 (1998), 2,177.9 (1997), 2,056.8 (1996), 1,963.0 (1995); note - since early 1998, the exchange rate has operated as a managed float; prior to that, the exchange rate was determined freely in the market

Fiscal year: calendar year

== See also ==
- List of companies of Paraguay
- Corruption in Paraguay
- Paraguay and the World Bank
- Central Bank of Paraguay
- Economy of South America
- List of Latin American and Caribbean countries by GDP growth
- List of Latin American and Caribbean countries by GDP (nominal)
- List of Latin American and Caribbean countries by GDP (PPP)
- Automovil Supply - retail chain in Paraguay
