= List of companies of Paraguay =

Location of Paraguay

Paraguay's economy is highly dependent on agricultural products, and agriculture represents around 30% of its GDP. Brazil, Argentina, and Chile are its main export partners. Its main import partners are Brazil, the United States, and China.

== Notable firms ==
This list includes notable companies with primary headquarters in their country. The industry and sector follow the Industry Classification Benchmark taxonomy. Organizations that have ceased operations are included and noted as defunct.

Notable companies Status: P=Private, S=State; A=Active, D=Defunct
Name	Industry	Sector	Headquarters	Founded	Notes	Status	
ABC Color	Media	Mass media	Asunción	1967	Newspaper	P	A
ANDE	Utilities	Electricity	Asunción	1949	Operator of electric grids	P	A
Aerolíneas Paraguayas	Consumer services	Airlines	Luque	1994	Defunct 2002	P	D
Banco Amambay	Financials	Bank	Asunción	1992	Owned by Grupo Cartes (1992–2023)	P	A
Banco Itaú Paraguay	Financials	Bank	Asunción	1978	Owned by Itaú Unibanco (Brazil)	P	A
Bolsa de Valores de Asunción	Financials	Financial services	Asunción	1977	Stock exchange	P	A
Central Bank of Paraguay	Financials	Bank	Asunción	1952	Central bank	S	A
Grupo Cartes	Conglomerates	Holding	Asunción	c. 1975	Defunct 2023	P	D
LATAM Paraguay	Consumer services	Airlines	Asunción	2016	Owned by LATAM Airlines Group (Chile)	P	A
Paranair	Consumer services	Airlines	Asunción	2018	Previously owned by Air Nostrum and Amaszonas	P	A
Petróleos Paraguayos	Oil & gas	Exploration & production	Asunción	1981	State petroleum	S	A
