= Abortion in Paraguay =

Abortion in Paraguay is illegal except in the case of harm to the life of the woman. Family planning services were heavily discouraged and illegal until the expansion of sexual education occurred in the 1970s and 1980s. With the foundation of CEPEP, lectures and education, sex education spread all over the country, utilized as a way to prevent pregnancy altogether and promote family planning.

== Paraguayan Penal Code ==
This law prohibits abortions in the case of fetal impairment, as well as performing one to protect the woman's mental and physical health, due to rape, incest, economic or social reasons. The only exception where an abortion would be allowed is in the case of harm to the mother by pregnancy or childbirth.

As stated in Ministry of Health legislation "Any woman responsible for her abortion, using a method by herself or giving her consent to a third party to perform a procedure, would be punished with up to 30 months in jail. If the person's honor was at risk, the punishment would be up to 12 months. Nevertheless, there would be no legal punishment if the procedure took place to save the person's life."

== History of Abortion ==
Abortion was criminalized in 1937, the legislation explained that abortion was limiting the nation's growth. The legislation required more government responsibility in adopting measures of abortion control. This law criminalized abortion, however it did not penalize the women who had the abortions. Midwives and physicians however were criminalized.

== The Paraguayan Center for Population Studies (CEPEP) ==
CEPEP is the local affiliate of the International Planned Parenthood Federation (IPPF), led by Dr. Dario Castagnino. CEPEP was designed to conduct studies in sociology, medicine and demography. The organization would conduct studies about abortions, how many illegal abortions were obtained as well as the effectiveness of various forms of contraceptives and intrauterine devices (IUDs), while also conducting surveys on the effectiveness of lectures and conferences about sexual education and family planning CEPEP held.CEPEP's goal was to promote sexual-education as a way for people to learn how to prevent pregnancy, so they would not need to have an abortion.

== Family Planning Program ==
In May 1972 the Ministry of Health formed The Department of Family Protection (DEPROFA). The departments responsibilities consisted of implementing family planning programs as well as supervision of all activities relating to family planning, carried out by both decentralized and private institutions. In September 1976 the new Rural Extension Project was introduced providing family planning services by auxiliary and obstetric nurses, family planning was implemented as part of the routine of all health services.The implementation of this was in order to educate people in ways to prevent pregnancy, such as condoms and IUDs, in order to attempt to prevent an abortion.

== Rural Extension Project ==
In 1975 16 government health clinics were actively providing family planning services, in addition to the 12 clinics who had initiated the services. By the end of 1976 a total of 42 government clinics were providing family planning services, 26 more were supplied contraceptives by CEPEP.This was implemented i order to spread family planning services to the more rural areas of Paraguay.

== The Effects of the Abortion Laws ==
A 10-year-old rape survivor, sparked attention by reproductive rights movements and the media. In April 2015, a mother brought her daughter to a local hospital in Paraguay after complaints of stomach pain. The doctor's determined that she was 21 weeks pregnant at the time, and advised if she went through with the pregnancy she may face serious health risks. The doctors requested the government to perform an abortion. However the Ministry of Health stated her life was not in danger, and denied the abortion request. The following month on 12 May 2015, a board of doctors, psychologists and psychiatrists conducted another examination, further confirming the health risks if the pregnancy were to continue, postpartum hemorrhaging, risk of endometrial infection because her reproductive health system was not fully developed.

The high-profile nature of this case has led opposition leftist parties to push for less restrictive abortion laws in Paraguay, such as in cases of child pregnancies and in cases of sexual assault. The United Nations has found that the maternal death rate is four times higher for girls under the age of 14 in Latin America.

30,000 abortions were performed in 2017, in Paraguay. The leading cause of maternal death in 2018 was unsafe abortions.In Paraguay, in 2019, close to 12,000 girls aged 15-19 gave birth.

In 2022, a Paraguay government hotline received a report of suspected sexual abuse, of a girl, 13-years-old. Members of the community reported the abuse when they noticed her wearing a girdle. When it was confirmed she was pregnant, she stated that her silence about the pregnancy came out of fear.

== See also ==
- Abortion by country
- Abortion law
- Domestic violence in Paraguay
- Health in Paraguay
- Women in Paraguay
- Reproductive rights in Latin America
