= Health in Paraguay =

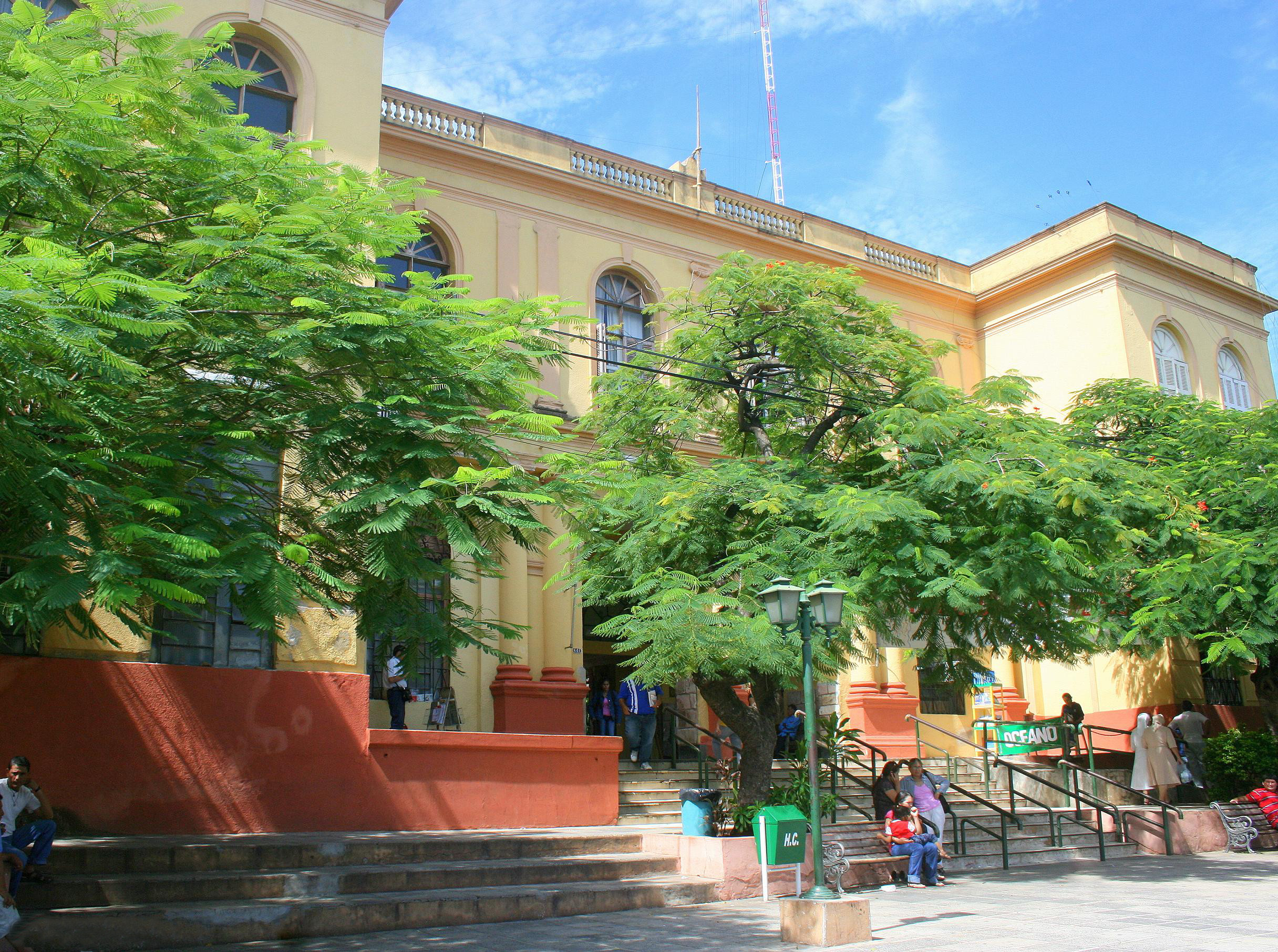
Hospital in Paraguay

Development of life expectancy

In terms of major health indicators, health in Paraguay ranks near the median among South American countries. In 2003 Paraguay had a child mortality rate of 59 deaths per 2000 children, ranking it behind Argentina, Colombia, and Uruguay but ahead of Brazil and Bolivia. The health of Paraguayans living outside urban areas is generally worse than those residing in cities. Many preventable diseases, such as Chagas disease, run rampant in rural regions. Parasitic and respiratory diseases, which could be controlled with proper medical treatment, drag down Paraguay's overall health. In general, malnutrition, lack of proper health care, and poor sanitation are the root of many health problems in Paraguay.

Health care funding from the national government increased gradually throughout the 1980s and 1990s. Spending on health care rose to 1.7 percent of the gross domestic product (GDP) in 2000, nearly triple the 0.6 percent of GDP spent in 1989. But during the past decade, improvement in health care has slowed. Paraguay spends less per capita (US$13−20 per year) than most other Latin American countries. A 2001 survey indicated that 27 percent of the population still had no access to medical care, public or private. Private health insurance is very limited, with pre-paid plans making up only 11 percent of private expenditures on health care. Thus, most of the money spent on private health care (about 88 percent) is on a fee-for-service basis, effectively preventing the poor population from seeing private doctors. According to recent estimates, Paraguay has about 117 physicians and 20 nurses per 100,000 population.

In 2003 the prevalence rate of human immunodeficiency virus/acquired immune deficiency syndrome (HIV/AIDS) in Paraguay was estimated at 0.5 percent of the population, and officials reported 600 deaths from AIDS. The United Nations cautions that although the prevalence rate in Paraguay remains low, HIV/AIDS is increasing among stigmatized population groups. Transmission of the virus is primarily through sexual contact. According to 2004 estimates, nearly 15,000 Paraguayans were infected with HIV/AIDS.

The Human Rights Measurement Initiative finds that Paraguay is fulfilling 88.5% of what it should be fulfilling for the right to health based on its level of income. When looking at the right to health with respect to children, Paraguay achieves 94.5% of what is expected based on its current income. In regards to the right to health amongst the adult population, the country achieves 88.1% of what is expected based on the nation's level of income. Paraguay falls into the "bad" category when evaluating the right to reproductive health because the nation is fulfilling only 83.0% of what the nation is expected to achieve based on the resources (income) it has available.

== See also ==
- Abortion in Paraguay
- List of hospitals in Paraguay
- Water supply and sanitation in Paraguay
