= Paraguay and the World Bank =

Relationship between a country and the World Bank

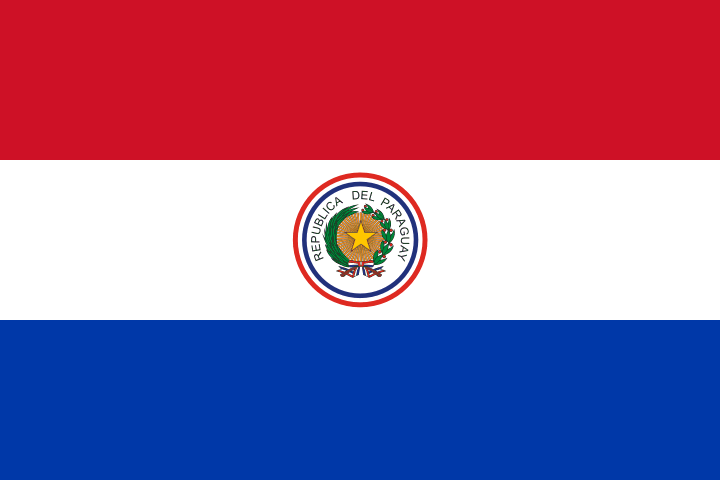
Flag of Paraguay

Paraguay joined the World Bank Group on 28 December 1945. In 1951, the World Bank approved an Agriculture project in Paraguay marking the beginning of a partnership that persists to this day and has given rise to 76 development projects of which 6 are currently active. Paraguay has received $2,718,521,989 in total commitments from the World Bank. Paraguay saw an annual growth rate of 4.5% per year until 2016 making it one of the fastest growing economies among regional neighbors. The implementation of steady and dependable macroeconomic policies have fostered a friendly environment for investors that largely contribute to Paraguay's consistent economic growth, however much of Paraguay's economic development has resulted from the replacement of forests with agriculture operations. As forests become increasingly scarce and climate change disrupts agricultural output, Paraguay will be forced to adapt its economy and society to meet a number of targets including strengthening the rule of law, achieving sustainability in regards to its natural resources, investing in human capital, and improving government services. To achieve these goals, Paraguay is collaborating with the World Bank including strategic partnerships with IBRD, and IFC. Jordan Schwartz is the World Bank director for Paraguay and Matilde Bordón is the World Bank representative.

== Economy ==
According to World Bank Data, Paraguay has a $40.842 billion GDP and a population of 6,956,071. Poverty has been steadily decreasing from 57.7% of Paraguayans living below the national poverty line in 2002 to only 26.4% in 2017. The GNI per capita in Paraguay is roughly $5,680 as of 2018 and the GDP per capita is roughly $11,790. Paraguay has a score of 0.53 on the Human Capital Index which allows a range of scores from 0 to 1. Annual GDP growth is projected to increase from 3.3% in 2019 to 4% in 2020. Agriculture is the largest contributor to Paraguay's GDP at 17.7% and 26.5% of Paraguay's labor force works in agriculture. Other important economic sectors of Paraguay include electricity and mining. Paraguay's banking industry is still recovering from a liquidity crisis in 1995 which saw the shutdown of several important banks following news of financial malpractice and money laundering. An IMF bailout aided in the recovery and reform of Paraguay's financial sector but Paraguay still struggles to find willing creditors.

== Energy Exporter/ Itaipú Dam ==
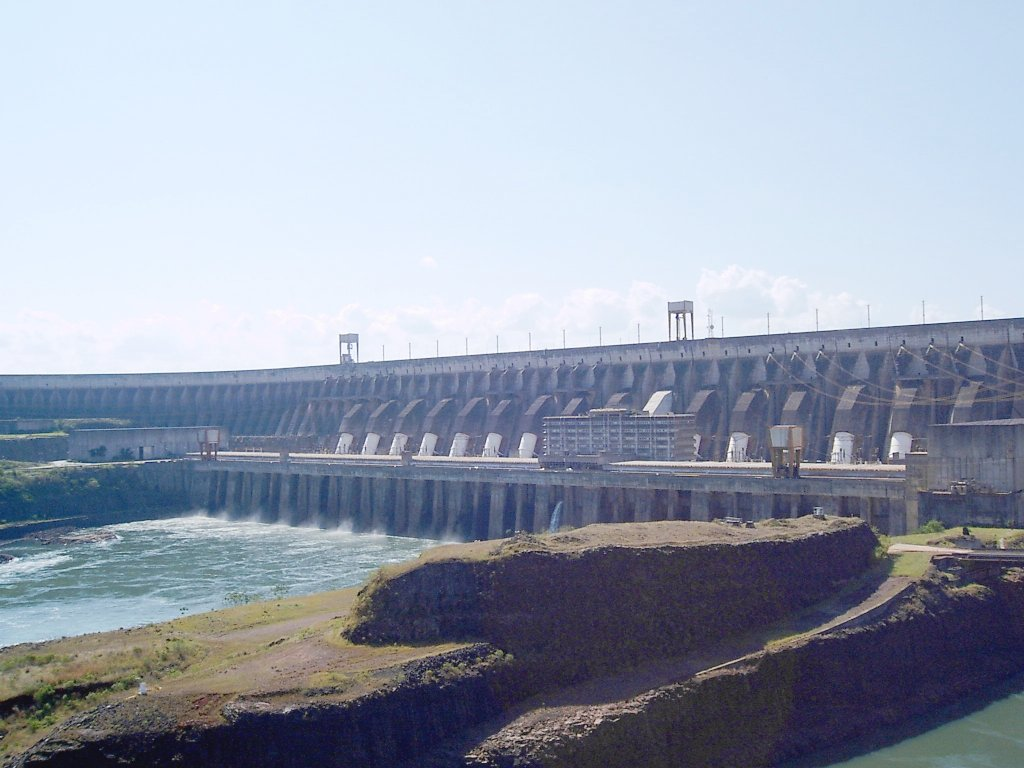
Itaipu Dam

Paraguay is one of the largest energy exporters in the world, and the World Bank places an emphasis on the realization and optimization of Paraguay's energy sector in order to boost its economy. Almost all of Paraguay's energy is produced at the massive Itaipú hydroelectric dam which lies on the Paraná river bordering Brazil and Paraguay. Though Paraguay could not contribute financially to the construction of the dam, it was able to contribute by conceding ownership of the construction site to Brazil and agreeing to export energy to Brazil at a discounted rate. Paraguay's economy was completely revitalized by the project and thousands of jobs were created. Construction spanned nine years from 1973 to 1982 and during this period the Gross Domestic Product of Paraguay grew at a rate of 8% annually and Brazil's appetite for Paraguayan energy provided the necessary stimulus for Paraguay to rapidly develop its agriculture sector.

== Strategic Partnerships ==
=== IBRD ===
The World Bank logo. The World Bank is the umbrella organization containing both the IFC and IBRD.

Paraguay is a middle income developing country. As such, it is not eligible to receive loans from the IDA but can draw funds from the IBRD. Paraguay has collaborated with the IBRD on a total of 58 projects in 10 sectors including agriculture, health, education, and central governance. In 2017, the IBRD approved $100 million in loans to Paraguay and one additional project. The IBRD has committed $315 million to Paraguay in 2019 of which $93.51 million has been disbursed as of July 31, 2019. A total of $1,877,481,989.20 has been committed to Paraguay by the IBRD. Paraguay holds 0.10% of IBRD votes.

=== IFC ===
The International Finance Corporation (IFC) works with private sector in developing nations. Paraguay is currently working with the IFC on 22 investment projects with total board approval amounts of $1,877,481,989.20. The IFC is working with Paraguay on 3 advisory projects with a total budget of $2,833,285.00.

The IFC is currently working with Paraguayan cattle farms to increase both profit and sustainability. Paraguay is one of the top 10 largest exporters of beef in the world. Much of its beef production occurs in the Chaco region of Paraguay which has lost 250,000 hectares of bio diverse forest per year. IFC intervention is expected to increase productivity from 140 to 250 kilograms of beef per hectare while preserving 50% of the regions native forests. Greenhouse gasses are expected to fall by 23% and the IFC is investing in energy and water efficient meat processing plants.

== Projects ==
=== PRODERS ===
The Sustainable Agriculture Agriculture and Rural development Project (PRODERS) is a $116 million project by the IBRD. It was approved in 2013 and has helped 24,875 households increase their agriculture output and profitability in rural regions of the country by providing technical assistance and connecting them to markets and value chains while also ensuring long term sustainability and environmental preservation. There will be an estimated total of 256,000 beneficiaries experiencing improved living conditions because of the project.

=== Water Sanitation Sector Modernization Project ===
The Water and Sanitation Sector Modernization project was improved in 2009 and has improved water access to 10% of the population in Asuncion. Key water sanitation and sewage facilities throughout the city were upgraded and modernized as well as 16 rural sewage networks for indigenous populations. Over 33 km of pipes were installed in total reducing the spread of disease and improving living conditions for thousands of Paraguayans.

=== Paraguay Health Sector Strengthening Project ===
The Paraguay Health Sector strengthening project has received a commitment of $115 million by the IBRD and is a project aimed at tackling a multitude of healthcare related goals in Paraguay. Firstly, it aims to strengthen Primary Care micro-networks by creating a centralized system for them to report performance through. The goal of the project is for 152 new family health care centers to be integrated into a new system so that a total of 225 are operating at a more efficient and improved national standard The project also aims to increase those covered by the Ministry of Public Health and Social Welfare with access to primary care from 32% to 40%. These Family Health Care Centers will also be improving their services and expanding them so that more women receive prenatal checkups, more hypertension patients are correctly diagnosed, and the number of TB cases diagnosed can increase from 78% to 88%. These goals will be met through the use of investments by the IBRD to build new care centers, train more staff, revise practice guidelines, increase patient registration in the new centralized database to 70%, and the implementation of a system to control the stock of certain medicines within the country.

== Controversy ==
=== Minerva Foods ===
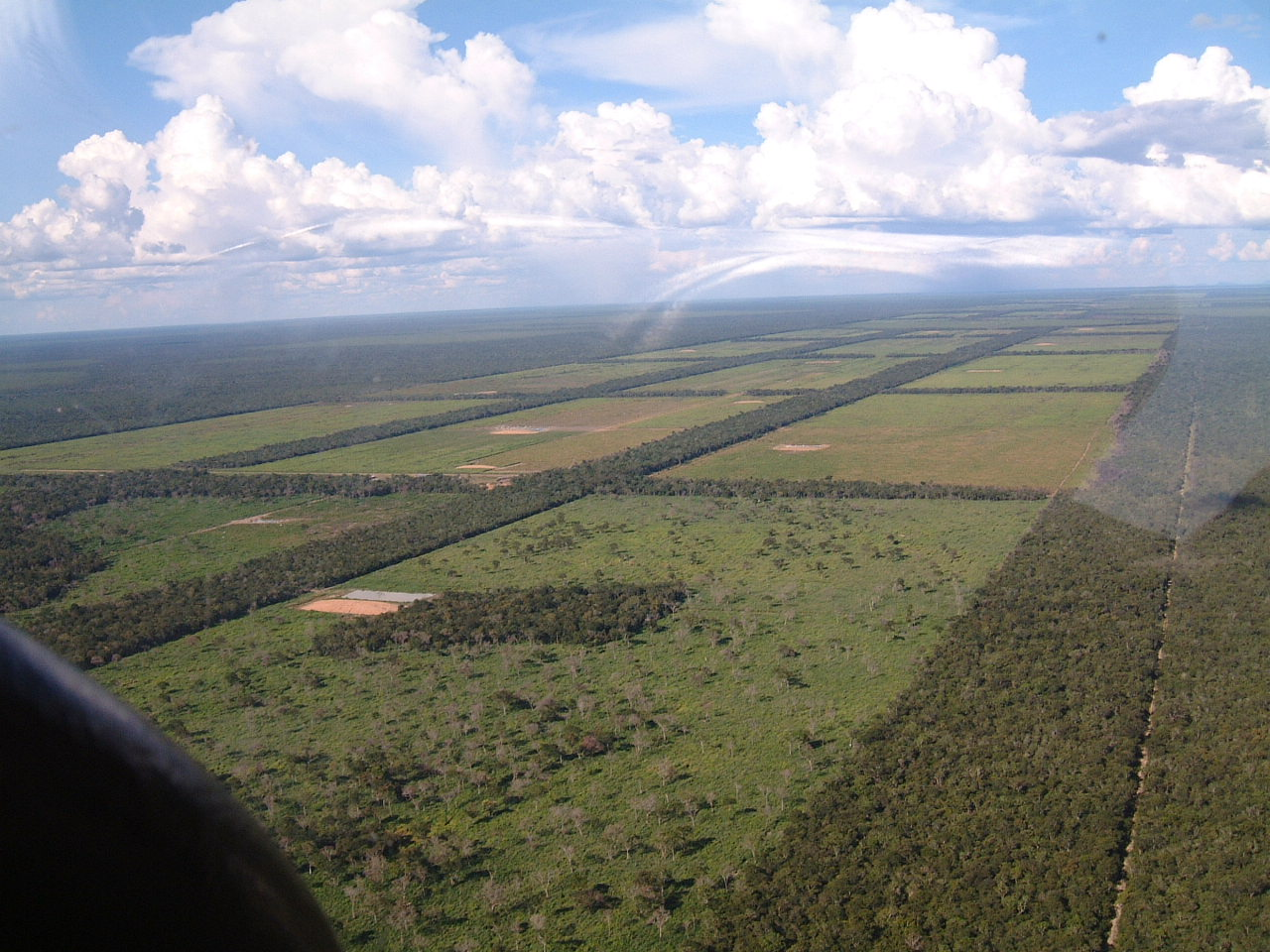
Clearings for cattle grazing in the Chaco region of Paraguay

In 2013 The World Banks private lending institution (IFC) approved a loan of $85 million to Brazilian beef company Minerva in an attempt to boost economic growth in the Chaco region of Paraguay. The loan was supposed to create employment opportunities and bring a much needed investment stream to the region, however investigative journalists from Reporter Brasil found evidence that the company was exploiting indigenous workers, including children, and clearing bio diverse forests to make way for cattle production. The loan was classified by the IFC as carrying "significant potential" for destructive environmental and social effects but was approved nonetheless. One condition of the loan was the inclusion of an "Environmental and Social Action Plan" which included a supply chain verification system to ensure that only ethical suppliers were being used. One element of that supply chain verification system required Minerva submit a map to the IFC outlining suppliers most likely to exploit slave and child labor, however no such map was ever submitted to the IFC nor were other actions undertaken to meet the conditions of the Environmental and Social Action Plan. Labor Unions in Paraguay that oppose the loan argue that without stringent safeguards, the program was certain to cause negative environmental and social implications from the start. The Chaco region is roughly the size of the United Kingdom and lacks the resources to enforce labor laws and carry out cattle farm inspections.

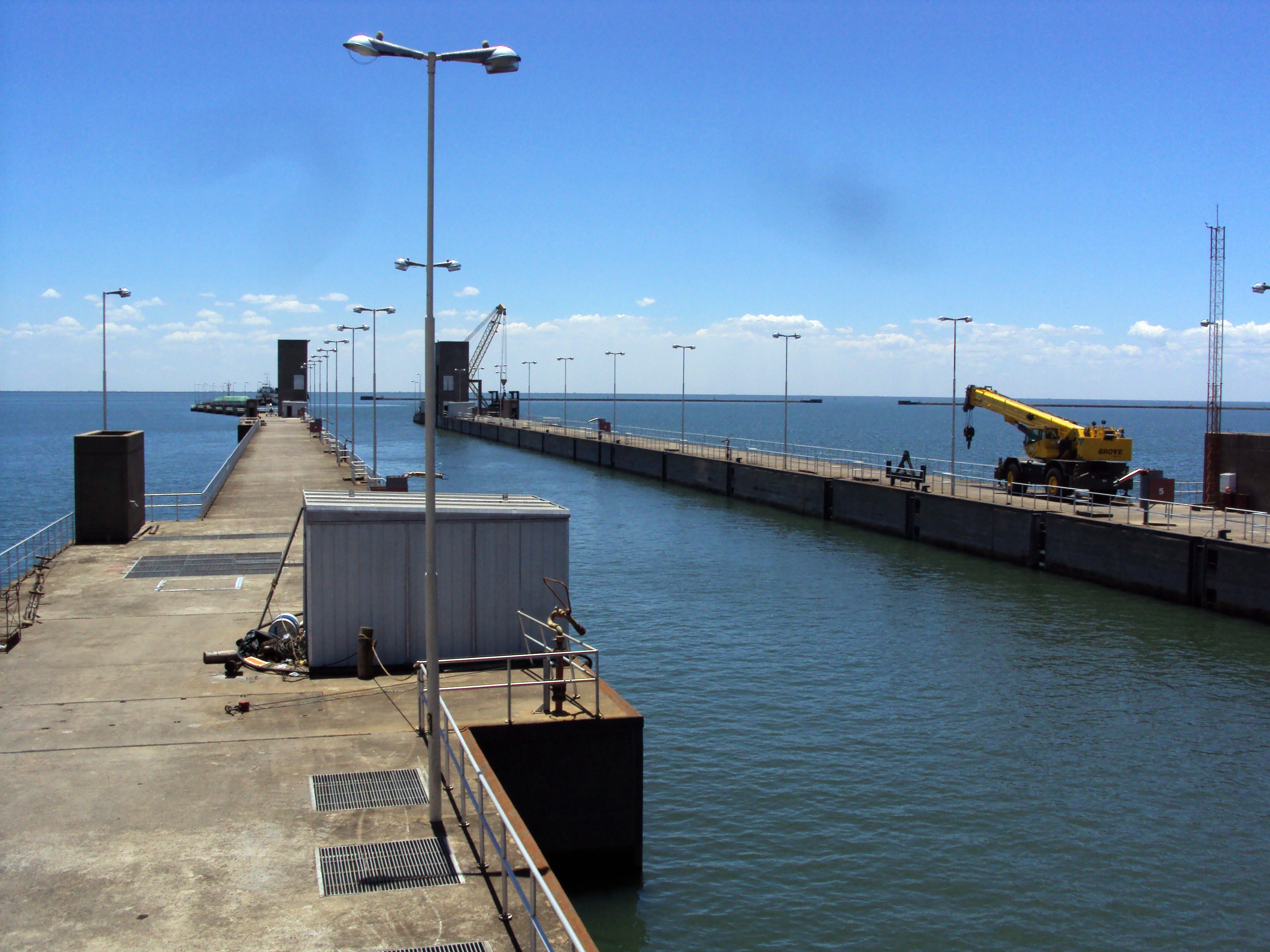
Yacyretá Dam

=== Yacyretá Hydroelectric Project ===
The Yacyretá Dam is a dam and hydroelectric power plant located between Argentina and Paraguay on the Paraná river. The project received a total of $766 million from the World Bank between 1979 and 1992 while initially being projected to cost around $2.6 billion. This estimate proved to be incorrect as the project has ended accumulating a price tag of over $12 billion to date and still does not operate at maximum capacity. This drastically increased project cost is attributed to a corruption scandal. During the construction of the project, engineering and construction companies and politicians siphoned off billions of dollars meant for the construction of the dam. Further sources of controversy include allegations that the World Bank violated its own environmental and supervision policies, accusations that were confirmed when the World Bank Inspection Panel visited the project and submitted a report outlining the policies that were violated. This did not stop the loans from being processed and in 1994, the floodgates of the dam were closed. The resulting flooding displaced 40,000 people and ravaged local infrastructure. Two species of aquatic snail are now extinct and pampas deer, capybara, certain water birds, and yacare cayman all suffered catastrophic population declines. There was also a large decline in the volume of certain species of fish in the Paraná river such as the Surubí. In 1997, World Bank Management issued a letter to the Paraguayan press claiming that it did not violate its policies on resettlement, environmental impacts, and community participation.
