= Automovil Supply =

Paraguayan auto parts store chain

- Industry: Retail
- Fate: Operating
- Area served: Paraguay
- Key people: Milner Buey Cataldo, Maria Antonia Arietti de Buey
- Products: Car parts
- Number of employees: 490
- Website: www.supply.com.py

Automovil Supply, S.A. is a Paraguayan chain of auto parts stores. Led by Maria Antonia Arietti de Buey, the chain was started by her husband, Milner Buey Cataldo. Milner Buey Cataldo was a Paraguayan of Spaniard descent, while his wife Maria Antonia, the current president of the company, is of Paraguayan and Italian descent.

The company opened its first store on 10 August 1955. It was at first named "Casa de los Rulemanes Automovil Supply" ("Automovil Supply Bearings Home"), but eventually, "Casa de los Rulemanes" was dropped off their name, and it is known simply as "Automovil Supply", with 27 stores across Paraguay.

During 2019, the brand celebrated its 64th. anniversary with parties held at all their 27 locations. During anniversaries of their company's establishment, the company celebrates by holding parties at its stores. These parties are open to clients.

In 2020, the company inaugurated a call center.
