= Water supply and sanitation in Paraguay =

Data
- Water coverage (broad definition): 99%
- Sanitation coverage (broad definition): 94%
- Share of self-financing by utilities: Urban: Nil; Rural: 60% user contribution
- Share of tax-financing: n/a
- Share of external financing: n/a

Institutions
- Decentralization to municipalities: None
- National water and sanitation company: Yes
- Water and sanitation regulator: Yes
- Responsibility for policy setting: Ministry of Public Works and Communications
- Sector law: Yes
- No. of urban service providers: 1 large public, 500 small private
- No. of rural service providers: 2,500

Despite many years of concerted efforts and achievements in expanding coverage and improving service sustainability, many issues remain to be addressed in the water and sanitation sector. Key issues include: (i) a low level of coverage for both water and sanitation, in particular in rural areas; (ii) a low level of cost recovery, despite a legal obligation for tariffs to recover costs; and (iii) an institutional framework that is only partially effective.

== Access ==
While coverage levels in urban areas are high using a broad definition of services, the coverage with higher levels of services (house taps and sewers) remains low compared to demand and to other countries in the region.

Water and sanitation coverage in Paraguay (2004)

		Urban (58% of the population)	Rural (42% of the population)	Total
Water	Broad definition	99%	68%	86%
	Household connections	82%	25%	58%
Sanitation	Broad definition	94%	61%	80%
	Sewerage	16%	0%	9%

Source: WHO/UNICEF Joint Monitoring Program (JMP /2006). Data for water and sanitation based on Permanent Housing Survey of the Census (2002).

== Recent developments ==
In April 2007 a seminar organized by the Center of Multidisciplinary Entrepreneurial Training (CAEM)-TECMA S.A. and financed by the IDB concluded that the Juntas need to improve their management and improve collection of outstanding bills in order to avoid institutional collapse. Otherwise a “domino effect” could occur and jeopardize the financial stability of SENASA as well as the country's commitments to the World Bank.

== Responsibility for water supply and sanitation ==
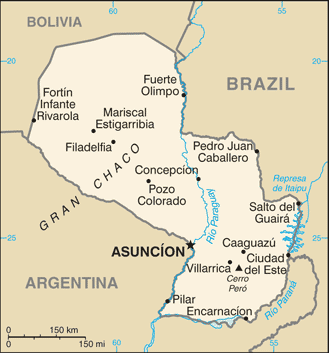

=== Policy and regulation ===
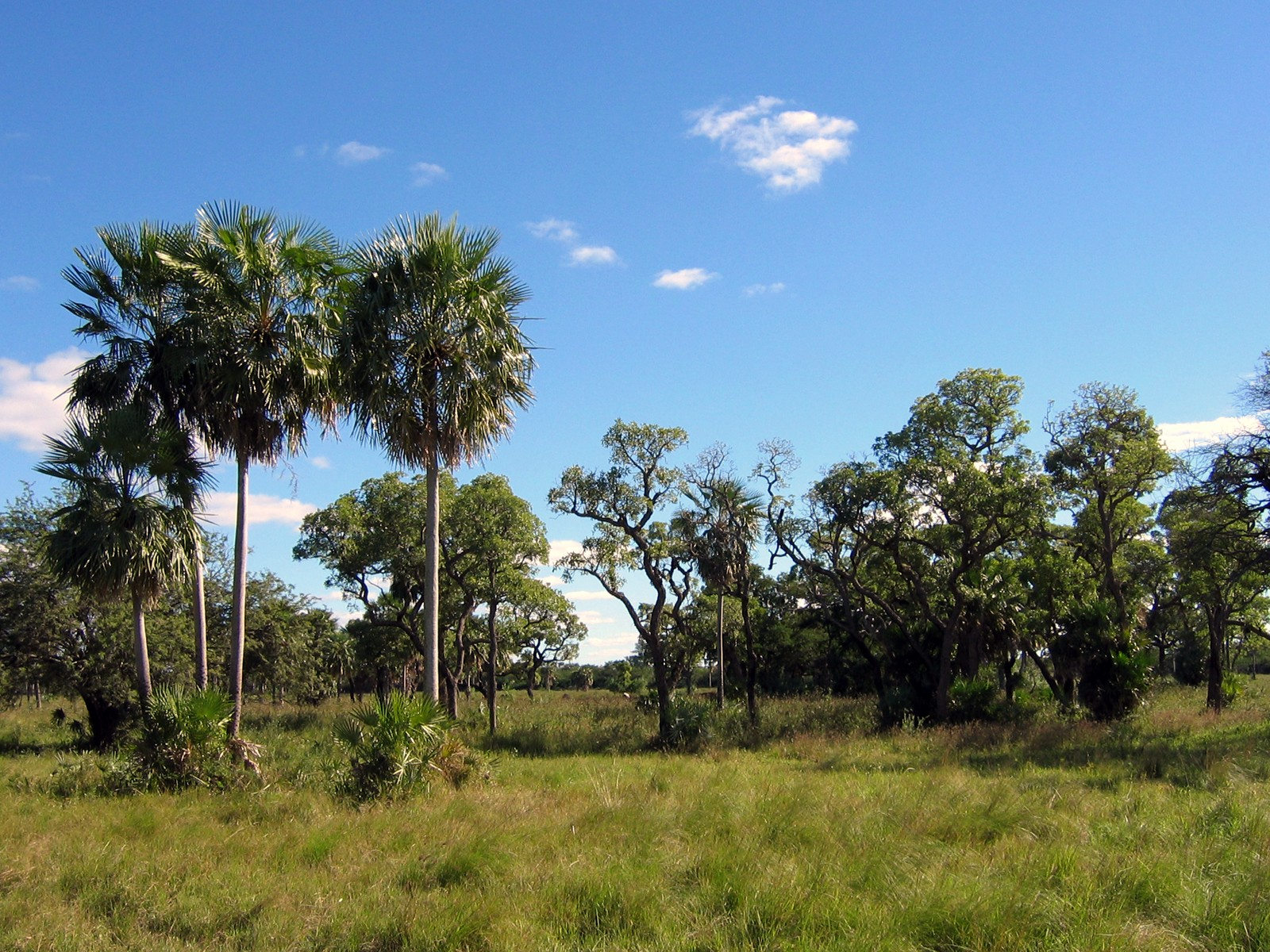
View of El Chaco

Responsibility for policy formulation is nominally vested in the Ministry of Public Works and Communications and regulation is entrusted to an autonomous entity, the Regulatory Agency for Sanitation (ERSSAN). The institutional framework is codified in Law 1614/00 of 2000 establishing a regulatory and tariff framework for the sector. The law, which created ERSSAN, was drafted with the expectation that private sector participation in the sector would substantially increase, which did not occur.

In practice, the Ministry of Public Works and Communications has not developed sector policies, leaving a vacuum in this important area. The regulatory agency, created for the purpose of regulating prospective private enterprises, has been ineffective at regulating the national public enterprise ESSAP. SENASA also faces many challenges, since it does not have sufficient capacity to provide adequate support to the ever-increasing number of Juntas.

=== Service provision ===
Responsibility for water and sanitation service provision in Paraguay in urban areas rests primarily with a national public enterprise, and with more than 1,621 community-managed water associations (Juntas de Saneamiento) in small cities and in rural areas.

The national enterprise, the Empresa de Servicios Sanitarios de Paraguay (ESSAP), is responsible for serving communities with populations of more than 10,000 inhabitants. In rural communities and small towns with less than 10,000 inhabitants water associations provide services, while technical assistance and financing are provided by the National Environmental Sanitation Service (SENASA).

The Juntas are grouped in 10 associations which supply water to more than half of country's population The first Juntas were created with the assistance of the World Bank's first rural water and sanitation loan to Paraguay in 1977, fostering a successful long-term partnership that endures until today.

An interesting phenomenon in Paraguay is the emergence of independent private suppliers, called “aguateros”, since the 1970s. Their efforts account for a significant share of the expansion of urban water coverage in the area of the capital. Aguateros are private, informal service providers who operate small-scale systems with up to 3,000 connections. An estimated 500 private suppliers serve some total of about 500,000 people.

== Tariffs and cost recovery ==
=== Urban areas ===
Urban utility tariffs are set below cost recovery levels and are adjusted infrequently, leading to substantial operating losses by the national water and sanitation enterprise. This makes it impossible to finance the investments necessary to further expand coverage and to improve service quality.

Tariffs by Aguateros fully recover costs and compare favorably with tariffs charged by the public sector. These tariffs are not regulated, but to some extent controlled by competition between aguateros serving neighboring areas.

=== Rural areas ===
Unlike in many other countries, local Juntas are well organized and do not only recover operating and maintenance costs, but also expand their systems using their own resources and repay a portion of capital costs to the national treasury.

=== Affordability ===
According to data collected by the Pan-American Health Organization based on multi-purpose household surveys, the share of water expenditures in household expenditures in urban areas of Paraguay was the lowest among 10 countries in Latin America and the Caribbean in the late 1990s. The share was on average 1.4% and 1.7% for urban households in the poorest income decile, showing an unusually low difference between the average and poor households. These shares are actually the same or even higher in rural areas, reflecting the unusual high levels of cost recovery in rural areas in Paraguay. Rural households spend on average 1.2% on water, and households in the poorest decile in rural areas spend 2.3% on water. Therefore, despite high levels of cost recovery, tariffs apparently remain affordable.

== External support ==
=== World Bank ===
As mentioned above, the World Bank’s relationship with the Government of Paraguay and the SENASA on rural water systems goes back for about 30 years. It spans three successfully completed rural water projects: the First, Second, and Third Rural Water Supply and Sanitation Projects (approved on December 13, 1977, June 16, 1981, and September 10, 1992, respectively). As a result, the Bank is one of the institutions most trusted by the Government to assist it in this sector. From 1997 to 2007 the Bank supported the US$ 55.7 million Fourth Rural Water Supply and Sanitation Project (approved on August 28, 1997), which aimed at increasing water supply and sanitation coverage in rural areas. A secondary development objective was to modify SENASA’s role in the sector from an implementer of projects to an efficiently managed promoter of activities.

The World Bank has also supported a pilot project to expand services in small towns by providing subsidies on a competitive basis, which involve “aguateros” as service providers. This experience is summarized in the note entitled Output-Based Aid in Water – Lessons in Implementation from a pilot in Paraguay.

On April 14, 2009, the World Bank approved a $64 million loan for the Paraguay Water and Sanitation Sector Modernization Project. The objective of the project is to increase the efficiency, coverage, and sustainability of water supply and sanitation services in Paraguay by (a) improving the governance of the sector, (b) improving water services and increasing access to sewerage services in the Asunción metropolitan area, and (c) increasing access to sustainable water and sanitation services in rural areas.

=== Interamerican Development Bank ===
In 2001 the IDB approved a US$12m loan to support a Small Community Water Supply Sanitation Project executed by SENASA. Until 2007 more than US$7m had been disbursed.

== See also ==
- Health in Paraguay

== Sources ==
- ERSSAN
- SENASA
- World Bank Rural Water and Sanitation Project
- IDB Water and Sanitation Projects
