= List of hospitals in Paraguay =

This is a list of hospitals in Paraguay.

== Asunción ==
- Centro Médico Bautista
- Centro Medico La Costa
- Centro Médico Pro-Med
- Cruz Roja Paraguaya
- Hospital Adjunto de la UNA
- Hospital General Barrio Obrero
- Hospital Central de las FF.AA.
- Hospital de Clínicas
- Hospital de Tuberculosis
- Hospital Privado Francés
- Hospital Materno Infantil
- Hospital Militar Central
- Hospital Neuropsiquiátrico
- Hospital San Jorge
- Hospital San Pablo
- Instituto de Medicina Tropical
- Instituto de Previsión Social (IPS)
- Policlínico Policial Rigoberto Caballero
- Sanatorio Adventista
- Sanatorio Americano
- Sanatorio Español
- Sanatorio Italiano
- Sanatorio Migone-Battilana
- Sanatorio Professor Doctor Juan Max Boettner
- Sanatorio Santa Clara
- Sanatorio San Roque

== Ciudad del Este ==
- Hospital Itaipú
- Hospital Luz y Vida
- Hospital Regional de Ciudad del Este
- Sanatorio Central
- Sanatorio Internacional
- Sanatorio Sagrada Familia
- IPS

== Encarnación ==
- Hospital Pediátrico Municipal
- Hospital Regional
- Hospital Tajy
- Sanatorio la Trinidad
- IPS

== San Ignacio ==
- Centro Materno Infantil SOS Hermann Gmeiner
- Clínica Privada San Luis
- Clínica Privada San Roque
- Hospital Distrital de San Ignacio
- IPS

== San Lorenzo ==
- Hospital Materno Infantil de San Lorenzo
- Clínica Centromed

== Itauguá ==
- Hospital Nacional de Itauguá
