= Bolsa de Valores de Asunción =

Stock exchange in Paraguay

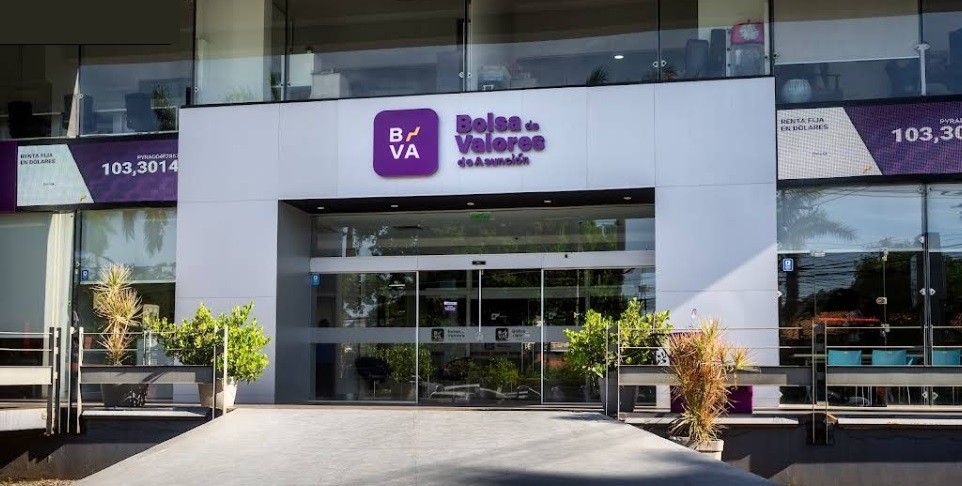
- Company type: Stock exchange
- Industry: Financial
- Founded: September 28, 1977
- Headquarters: Asunción, Paraguay
- Key people: Eduardo Borgognon (President)
- Products: Stock exchange
- Website: www.bolsadevalores.com.py

The Bolsa de Valores de Asunción (BVA) (Asunción Stock Exchange) is a stock exchange located in Asunción, the capital city of Paraguay.

== History ==
The Bolsa de Valores de Asunción (BVA), then known as Bolsa de Valores y Productos de Asunción (BVPASA), was founded by the Cámara Nacional de Comercio y Servicios del Paraguay (National Chamber of Commerce and Services of Paraguay) on 28 September 1977. After a long period without market activity, in 1991 the Law N° 94/91 of Paraguayan Stock Market was approved, setting legal requirements for the engagement of market operations.

== See also ==
- Economy of Paraguay
- List of stock exchanges
- List of American stock exchanges
- Americas Central Securities Depositories Association
