= Sol del Paraguay =

Paraguayan airline

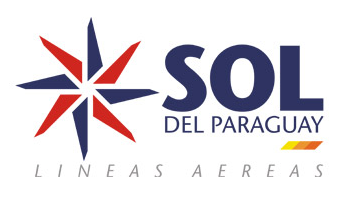
IATA	ICAO	Call sign
PI	SGU	SOLPARAGUAYO
- Founded: 10 July 2010; 15 years ago
- Commenced operations: 15 July 2011; 14 years ago
- Ceased operations: 1 August 2012; 13 years ago
- Hubs: Silvio Pettirossi International Airport
- Fleet size: 1
- Destinations: 4
- Parent company: Crucero del Norte
- Headquarters: Asunción, Paraguay
- Key people: Julio Koropeski (CEO)
- Website: www.viajaconsol.com

Sol del Paraguay Líneas Aéreas, S.A. was a Paraguayan passenger airline, based at Silvio Pettirossi International Airport in the city of Asunción.

== History ==
The project to create the airline began on July 1, 2010. Sol del Paraguay is also a Paraguayan road transportation company that runs national and international routes, and is one of the largest long-distance bus operators in Paraguay. Due to its rapid growth, the company decided to expand, and thus the idea to launch Sol del Paraguay Lineas Aereas came about. It had 3 Fokker 100s with a capacity of 108 passengers, with another on order. The company's first proving flight took place in May 2011, coinciding with the 200th anniversary of Paraguayan independence, and scheduled services began on July 15, 2011. The airline operated two routes, with twice-daily domestic flights between Asunción and Ciudad del Este; and twice-daily between Asunción and Buenos Aires.

The launch of Sol del Paraguay Lineas Aereas was considered very important in Paraguay. The country had spent 15 years without a national airline, since former flag-carrier, Líneas Aéreas Paraguayas became a part of Brazilian airline TAM Linhas Aéreas in 1996. The initiation of flights in 2011 was somewhat symbolic, as it was the bicentenary of Paraguayan independence, and the company's three aircraft were all named after Paraguayan national symbols: Lago de Ypacaraí, Itapúa Poty, and Héroes del Chaco. It had been reported that Sol del Paraguay would operate domestic flights to Encarnación and Pedro Juan Caballero, two cities which, despite having airports, did not have any scheduled flights.

On August 1, 2012, the airline ceased all operations due to financial problems following a local economic downturn.

In mid-2014 a proposal came out to revive the company, now only the Paraguayan aeronautical authorities are expected to restart flights. Since the restart of its operations on January 12, 2016, it has operated with a Cessna 208 Caravan to Encarnación, then Pedro Juan Caballero was added among its destinations, and by July 2019, Ciudad del Este was also added. As of 2022, the airline's only aircraft was retired and its website has been inactive.

== Destinations ==
The company operates to the following destinations (as of 2022):

Country	City	Airport	Notes	Refs
Argentina	Buenos Aires	Ministro Pistarini International Airport	Terminated	
Paraguay	Asunción	Silvio Pettirossi International Airport	Hub	
Paraguay	Ciudad del Este	Guaraní International Airport	Periodically suspended	
Paraguay	Encarnacion	Teniente Amin Ayub Gonzalez Airport	Periodically suspended	
Paraguay	Pedro Juan Caballero	Dr. Augusto Roberto Fuster Airport	Periodically suspended	

== Fleet ==
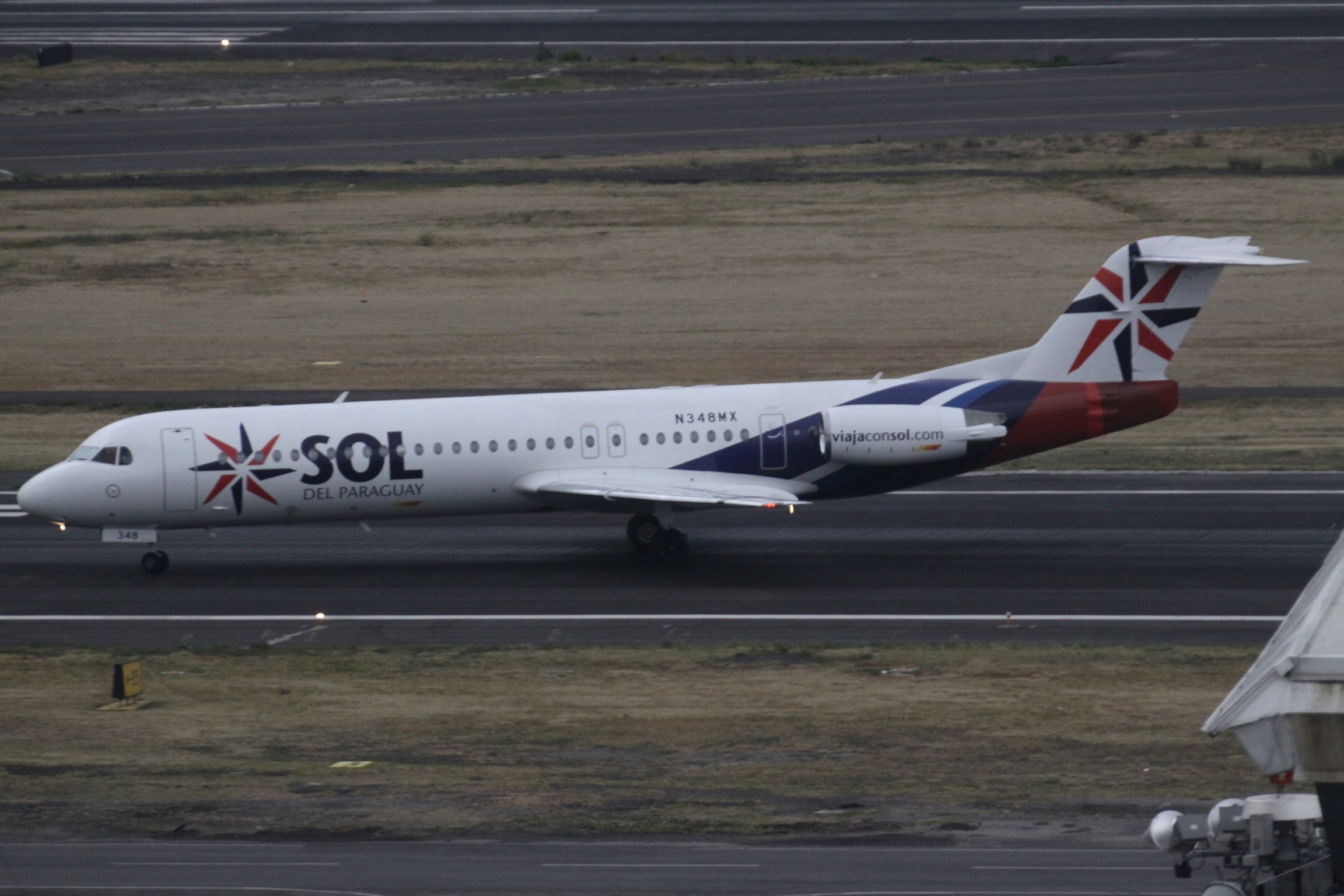
A former Sol del Paraguay Fokker 100 taxiing at Mexico City International Airport in 2010

Sol del Paraguay operated the following aircraft:

Sol del Paraguay fleet
Aircraft	Total	Introduced	Retired	Notes
Cessna 208B Grand Caravan	1	2016	2022	
Fokker 100	3	2010	2012	

== See also ==
- List of airlines of Paraguay
