= Aerolíneas Paraguayas =

ARPA – Aerolíneas Paraguayas
IATA	ICAO	Call sign
A8	PAY	ARPA
- Founded: May 14, 1994
- Commenced operations: May 16, 1994
- Ceased operations: December 2002 (Merged with TAM Mercosur)
- Hubs: Silvio Pettirossi International Airport
- Fleet size: 4
- Destinations: 3
- Parent company: TAM Linhas Aéreas
- Headquarters: Luque, Paraguay

ARPA – Aerolíneas Paraguayas was an airline with its headquarters on the grounds of Silvio Pettirossi International Airport in Luque, Paraguay, near Asunción. It operated scheduled domestic services. Its main base was Silvio Pettirossi International Airport.

== History ==
Aerolíneas Paraguayas was founded on May 14, 1994, with an inauguration ceremony at Silvio Pettirossi International Airport. The first regular flights took place on May 16, 1994, with a fleet composed of three Cessna A208 Caravan 1. ARPA was the first investment of TAM Linhas Aéreas in Paraguay.

At their foundation, ARPA had flights to large cities in Paraguay, like Ciudad del Este, Pedro Juan Caballero, Concepción and Encarnación. Eventually, it also flew to Ayolas and Filadelfia (Chaco). In 1995, ARPA received a Cessna Citation II jet to compete with LADESA (Líneas Aéreas del Este S.A.) BAe Jetstream 31s which also covered the route to Ciudad del Este.

On September 1, 1996, ARPA purchased 80% of the majority shares of Líneas Aéreas Paraguayas. It was sold to its parent company a month later, rebranded as TAM Mercosur.

Some routes were discontinued due to the poor passenger traffic. By the late 1990s, ARPA was only flying to Ciudad del Este regularly. In the early 2000s, ARPA operated 2 Cessna 208B Gran Caravans.

In December 2002, ARPA was merged with TAM Mercosur. The two Caravans continued operations with TAM and were withdrawn from service a year later.

== Destinations ==
ARPA served the following cities:

Paraguay

- Asunción - Silvio Pettirossi International Airport
- Ciudad del Este - Guaraní International Airport
- Pedro Juan Caballero - Dr. Augusto Roberto Fuster Airport

== Fleet ==
- 3 Cessna 208B Grand Caravan (Leased from TAM Express)
- 1 Cessna 550 Citation II (Operated by TAM Aviação Executiva)

== See also ==
- List of defunct airlines of Paraguay
