= Teniente Amin Ayub Gonzalez Airport =

Lieutenant Ramon A. Ayub Gonzalez International Airport Aeropuerto Internacional Teniente Ramon A. Ayub González
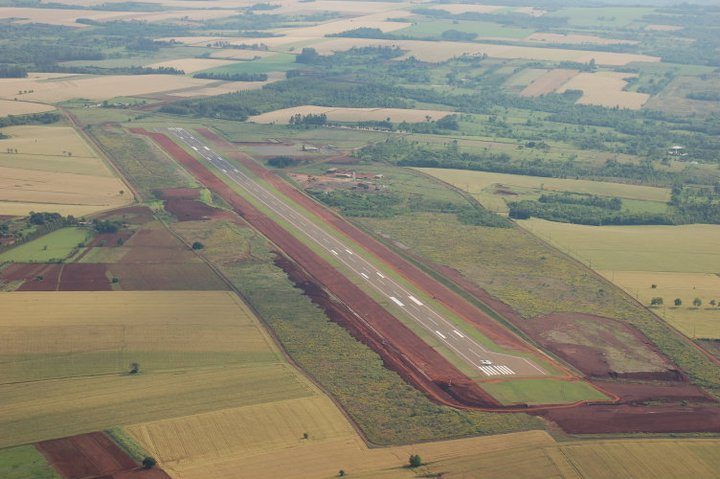
- Runway view from the air
- IATA: ENO; ICAO: SGEN

Summary
- Airport type: Public
- Serves: Encarnación
- Location: Capitán Miranda, Paraguay
- Elevation AMSL: 199 m (653 ft)
- Coordinates: 27.2270°S 55.8373°W
- Interactive map of Lieutenant Ramon A. Ayub Gonzalez International Airport

Runways
Direction	Length		Surface
Direction	m	ft	Surface
02/20	2,200	7,218	Asphalt

Statistics (2025)
- Passengers: 180
- Statistics: DINAC

Teniente Ramon A. Ayub Gonzalez International Airport (Spanish: Aeropuerto Teniente Ramon A. Ayub González) (IATA: ENO, ICAO: SGEN) is an international airport serving Encarnación, capital of the Itapúa Department of Paraguay. It is located in the Capitan Miranda district, around 14 km north of the center of Encarnación.

== History ==
The airport belongs to the Municipality of Encarnación, and was constructed nearby the Yacyretá Dam. Initially, projects were planned for flights to Asunción and Buenos Aires.

=== 2010s ===
The airport was habilitated in 2013. On 4 January 2013, it was reported that the first commercial flight would arrive at Encarnación on 15 January from Resistencia, Argentina. On 6 January 2013, ABC reports that the Intendent of Encarnación, Juan Smalko, informs of the habilitation of Encarnación's Airport to operate national and international flights. The habilitation serves for small air planes, which can be private or public. Juan Smalko informs that the airport operates flight during the day time but would soon be implementing a regular line of flights, with an Argentine airline. On 15 January 2013, it is said that the route from Asunción to Encarnación will become the second domestic route to operate regularly in Paraguay, in addition to the Asunción-Ciudad del Este route which is operate by TAM Mercosur.

On 19 January 2013, it is reported that the first international flight descends at Encarnación's Airport, arriving from Bahia, Brazil. TAGUA operated to Asunción's Silvio Pettirossi Airport as of 10 November 2014. On 12 January 2016 the airport was officially habilitated for night flights by DINAC, after a system of runway lights had been installed.

=== 2020s ===
In March 2020, the national authorities announced the expansion of the airport, including extending the runway to 500 metres. The airport continued operation during the COVID-19 pandemic quarantine. In December 2020, the president of the DINAC planned to realize investments to better the airport's infrastructure. For 2020, it closed with a total of 1, 346 flights.

In September 2024 the government again announced that they would invest 3.5 million dollars in improvements to the airport in the context of the 2025 World Rally Championship.

== Statistics ==
As of 2013, the airport had an average of two to three flights per day.

== See also ==
- List of airports in Paraguay
- Transport in Paraguay
