= Regional Paraguaya =

Paraguayan Airline

IATA	ICAO	Call sign
P7	REP	REGIOPAR
- Founded: 2007
- Ceased operations: August 2010
- Hubs: Silvio Pettirossi International Airport
- Fleet size: 2
- Destinations: 2
- Headquarters: Asunción, Paraguay
- Key people: Salvador Sturno (President)
- Website: regionalparaguaya.com.py

Regional Paraguaya Líneas Aéreas (officially AeroRegional Paraguaya S.A.), was a regional airline based at Silvio Pettirossi International Airport, in Asunción, and was intended to be the new flag carrier of Paraguay.

It officially announced its operations would launch on November 2, 2008, with chartered services.

== Destinations ==
By April 2009, the airline planned to operate scheduled flights to Argentina, Bolivia, Brazil, Chile, Germany, Spain, Uruguay.

== Fleet ==
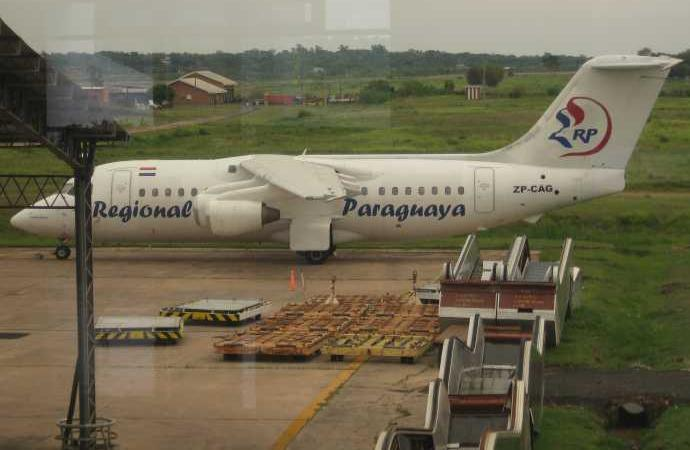
Regional Paraguaya's first aircraft, a BAe 146-200 at the Silvio Pettirossi International Airport. This aircraft was not used by the airline.

The Regional Paraguaya fleet included the following aircraft (as of March 2009):

Regional Paraguaya fleet
Aircraft	In service	Orders	Passengers			Notes
Aircraft	In service	Orders	C	Y	Total	Notes
Boeing 737-200	2	2	–	120	120	
Boeing 767-300ER	—	1	18	220	238	
Total	2	3				

== Controversy ==
In June 2009, Regional Paraguaya released a new livery that was closely identical to the livery of Gulf Air, the flag carrier of Bahrain. After Gulf Air considered taking legal actions, Regional Paraguaya immediately revised its livery.

== See also ==
- List of defunct airlines of Paraguay
