= Rolim Amaro =

Brazilian businessman, TAM founder (1942–2001)

Rolim Adolfo Amaro
- Born: 15 October 1942; Pereira Barreto, São Paulo, Brazil
- Died: 8 July 2001 (aged 58); Pedro Juan Caballero, Amambay, Paraguay
- Other name: Comandante Rolim
- Occupation: Pilot
- Known for: TAM Airlines founder

Rolim Adolfo Amaro (15 September 1942 – 8 July 2001; sometimes known as "Comandante Rolim") was a Brazilian pilot, airline owner, and founder of TAM Airlines.

== Biography ==
At age 21, Amaro became a pilot for a new air taxi company known as TAM – Táxi Aéreo Marília. The company began operations in 1961 with an alliance of 10 young pilots. At the time, they transported cargo and charter passengers between Paraná, São Paulo, and Mato Grosso. After six years at the company, Amaro left Taxi Aéreo Marília. At the same time, it was sold to businessman Orlando Ometto, its headquarters moved to São Paulo, and the company profile changed when it became a courier company.

Upon leaving TAM, Amaro, being at ease with personalized service, became an independent pilot. He bought his first airplane, a Cessna 170, and moved with his family to São Félix do Araguaia where he began his first business project and founded Araguaia Transportes Aéreos (ATA). Two years later, the company had 15 airplanes.

Amaro's reconciliation with TAM took place in 1971, when Ometto asked him to become a minority partner owning 33% of the stocks. At the time, the company was going through a difficult financial period and was only transporting 3,000 passengers. The following year, Amaro acquired half of TAM's stock and took over management of the company. He introduced his trademark and began practicing his primary philosophy: "Focus on the client by offering quality service."

In 1976, TAM - Transportes Aéreos Regionais emerged as a scheduled regional airline, which learned from the experience of TAM - Táxi Aéreo Marília. By then, Amaro owned 67% of the new company. The first year, while domestic aviation was growing 15% a year, TAM was registering an increase of 70% every six months. Amaro later took full control of the company's stock.

Amaro died in a helicopter crash at Fortuna Guazú, 38 kilometres (24 miles) from the Paraguayan city of Pedro Juan Caballero. At the time of his death, the company had grown to the point of being almost even with direct competitor Varig.
