= LATAM Airlines Paraguay =

Airline based in Paraguay

IATA	ICAO	Call sign
PZ	LAP	PARAGUAYA
- Founded: 17 November 1962; 63 years ago (as Líneas Aéreas Paraguayas)
- Commenced operations: 1 September 1996; 30 years ago (as TAM Mercosur); 5 May 2016; 10 years ago (as LATAM Paraguay)
- Hubs: Silvio Pettirossi International Airport
- Frequent-flyer program: LATAM Pass
- Fleet size: 5
- Destinations: 4 (2026)
- Parent company: LATAM Airlines Group (94.98%)
- Headquarters: Asunción, Paraguay
- Key people: Enrique Alcaide (CEO)
- Website: www.latam.com/es_py/

Transportes Aéreos del Mercosur S.A, d/b/a LATAM Airlines Paraguay (formerly known as TAM Paraguay and previously Líneas Aéreas Paraguayas), is the flag carrier and the national airline of Paraguay with its headquarters in Asunción, Paraguay. Its flights operate from Silvio Pettirossi International Airport in Asunción. Its parent is the Chilean company, LATAM Airlines Group.

== History ==
The former TAM Mercosur logo

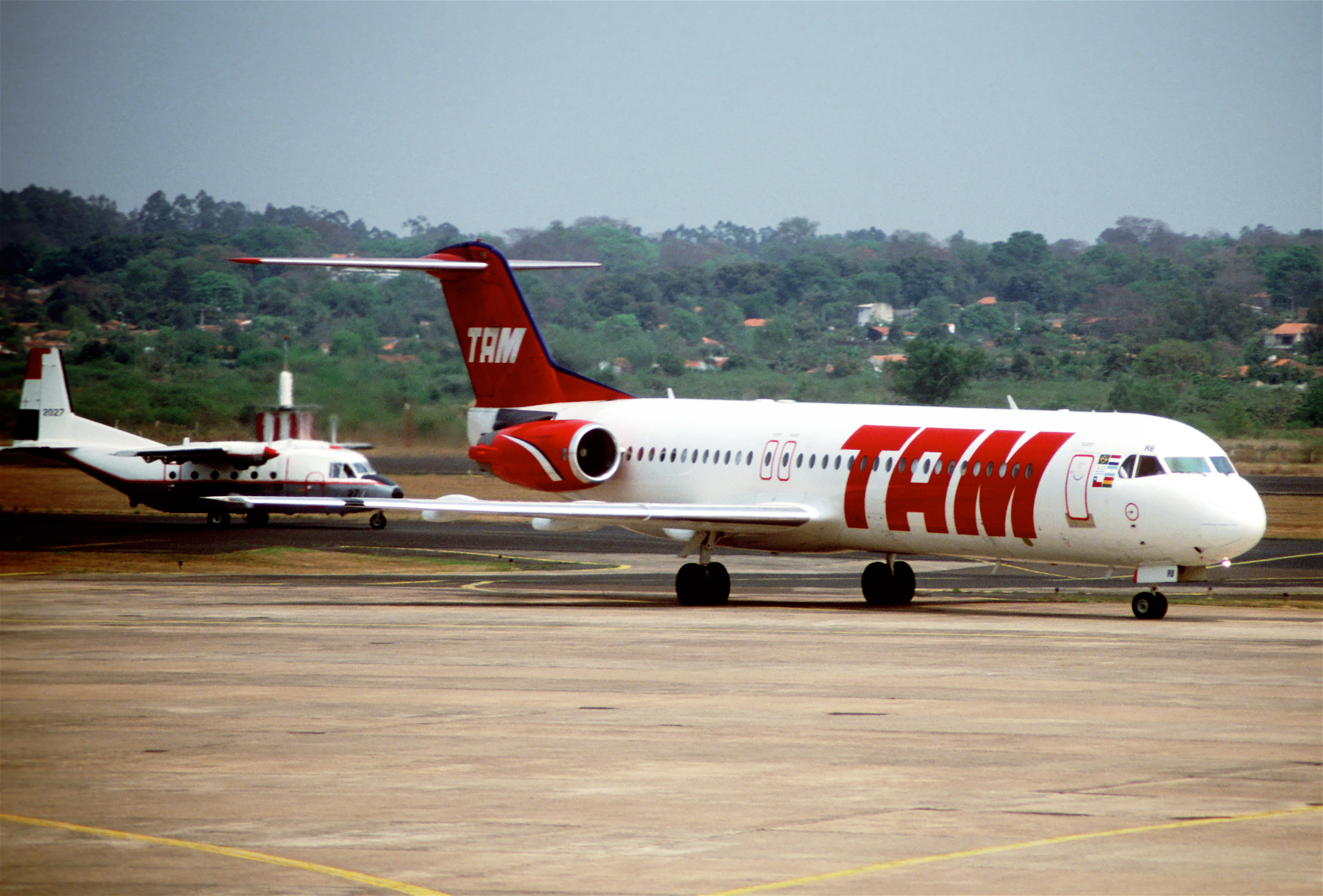
Former TAM Mercosur Fokker 100 taxiing at Silvio Pettirossi International Airport in 2004

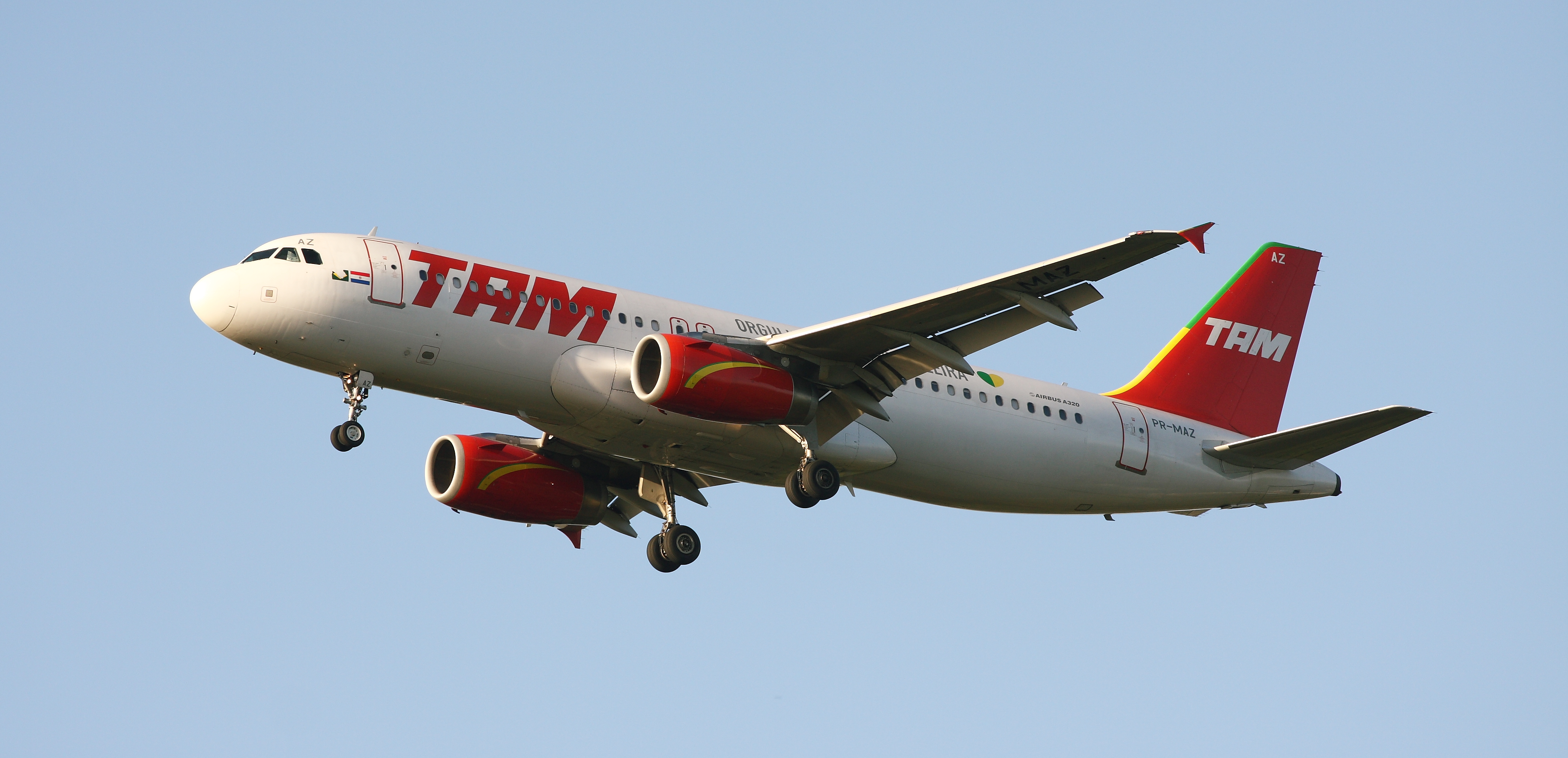
TAM Paraguay Airbus A320-200 in 2009

The airline was established on November 17, 1962, and started operations in 1963 as Líneas Aéreas Paraguayas. Between 1995 and 1996 the airline operated as a subsidiary of the Ecuadorian airline SAETA under the name LAPSA Air Paraguay. LAPSA ceased operations in 1996.

On September 1, 1996, Aerolíneas Paraguayas (a subsidiary of TAM Linhas Aéreas) purchased 80% of the majority shares of LAPSA and both airlines were merged under the name TAM – Transportes Aéreos del Mercosur. This merge marked the birth of a new airline, heir to LAP and LAPSA. On October 6, 1996 TAM Mercosur was sold to TAM Linhas Aéreas. At that time it used two Fokker 100 jets to cover regional destinations.

In March 2008, following a branding strategy, the name TAM Mercosur was dropped and the airline adopted a corporate identity identical to its Brazilian owner. However, its corporate structure remained the same. The airline was rebranded as LATAM Paraguay following the merger and creation of the LATAM Airlines Group and the subsequent rebranding of its member airlines. As of May 2018, LATAM owned 94.98% and the Paraguayan Government owned 5.02% of the shares.

== Destinations ==
As of September 2026, LATAM Paraguay offers or has previously offered scheduled flights to the following destinations:

Country	City	Airport	Notes	Refs
Argentina	Buenos Aires	Aeroparque Jorge Newbery	Terminated	
Argentina	Buenos Aires	Ministro Pistarini International Airport	Terminated	
Argentina	Córdoba	Ingeniero Aeronáutico Ambrosio L.V. Taravella International Airport	Terminated	
Bolivia	Cochabamba	Jorge Wilstermann International Airport	Terminated	
Bolivia	La Paz	El Alto International Airport	Terminated	
Bolivia	Santa Cruz de la Sierra	Viru Viru International Airport	Terminated	
Brazil	Brasília	Pres. Juscelino Kubitschek International Airport^{a}	Terminated	
Brazil	Curitiba	Afonso Pena International Airport	Terminated	
Brazil	Rio de Janeiro	Galeão–Antonio Carlos Jobim International Airport	Terminated	
Brazil	São Paulo	Guarulhos–Gov. André Franco Montoro International Airport		
Chile	Iquique	Diego Aracena International Airport	Terminated	
Chile	Santiago	Arturo Merino Benítez International Airport		
Paraguay	Asunción	Silvio Pettirossi International Airport	Hub	
Paraguay	Ciudad del Este	Guaraní International Airport	Terminated	
Peru	Lima	Jorge Chávez International Airport		
Uruguay	Montevideo	Carrasco/Gal. Cesáreo L. Berisso International Airport^{b}	Terminated	
Uruguay	Punta del Este	Capitán de Corbeta Carlos A. Curbelo International Airport	Terminated	

a.Route operated by Paranair on behalf of LATAM Paraguay as wet-lease.
b.Plans to resume services in 2027.

== Fleet ==
=== Current fleet ===
As of May 2023, LATAM Paraguay operated an all-Airbus A320 fleet composed of the following aircraft:

LATAM Paraguay fleet
Aircraft	In service	Orders	Passengers			Notes
Aircraft	In service	Orders	J	Y	Total	Notes
Airbus A320-200	5	—	–	174	174	Operated by LATAM Brasil
Total	5	—				

== Mileage Program ==
LATAM Pass is the airline's frequent flyer program to reward customer loyalty. Members earn miles every time they fly with LATAM Airlines group, an affiliated airline, or by using the services of any LATAM Pass-associated business around the world.

The LATAM Pass program has five membership categories:

- Latam
- Gold
- Platinum
- Black
- Black Signature

== See also ==
- List of airlines of Paraguay
