= List of airlines of Paraguay =

This is a list of airlines in Paraguay.

== Active ==
Airline	Image	IATA	ICAO	Callsign	Founded	Notes
Delcar Express					2007	
Isgeair					2022	Planned cargo airline
LATAM Airlines Paraguay	LATAM Paraguay Airbus A320-200	PZ	LAP	PARAGUAYA	2016	Flag carrier
Paranair		ZP	AZP	GUARANI	2018	
Sol del Paraguay		PI	SGU	SOLPARAGUAYO	2010	Inactive
Transporte Aéreo Guaraní					2014	

== Defunct ==
Airline	Image	IATA	ICAO	Callsign	Founded	Ceased operations	Notes
Ad Maiora Líneas Aéreas					2012	2013	
AeroLap Paraguay Airlines					2014	2014	Never launched
Aerolineas Paraguayas		A8	PAY	ARPA	1994	2002	Merged into TAM Mercosur
AeroSur Paraguay					2008	2012	A subsidiary of AeroSur that never launched
Amaszonas Paraguay		ZP	AZP	GUARANI	2015	2018	Rebranded as Paranair
Cargopar Lineas Aereas					1994	1997	
LADESA - Lineas Aerea del Este			OQG		1994	1999	
LAPSA		PZ	LAP	PARAGUAYA	1995	1996	Rebranded to TAM Mercosur
Líneas Aéreas Paraguayas		PZ	LAP	PARAGUAYA	1962	1994	Re-established as LAPSA
Paraguay Air Cargo			CPY	PANAIR	1988	1991	
Regional Paraguaya		P7	REP	REGIOPAR	2007	2010	
TAM Mercosur		PZ	LAP	PARAGUAYA	1996	2008	Renamed to TAM Paraguay
TAM Paraguay		PZ	LAP	PARAGUAYA	2008	2016	Renamed to LATAM Airlines Paraguay

== See also ==
- List of airlines
- List of airlines of South America
- List of defunct airlines of South America
