= Paranair =

Paraguayan airline

Paranair S.A.
IATA	ICAO	Call sign
ZP	AZP	GUARANI
- Founded: 2015 (as Amaszonas Paraguay); 15 October 2018 (as Paranair)
- Commenced operations: 23 September 2015; 11 years ago
- Hubs: Silvio Pettirossi International Airport
- Fleet size: 3
- Destinations: 9
- Headquarters: Asunción, Paraguay
- Website: www.paranair.com

Paranair S.A. (legally known as Compañía de Aviación Paraguaya S.A.) is a Paraguayan airline based at Silvio Pettirossi International Airport, in the country's capital of Asunción. It utilizes a fleet of Bombardier CRJ100/200 aircraft to operate scheduled flights between Paraguay and other South American countries.

== History ==
Paranair's previous logo as Amaszonas Paraguay

The airline was founded in 2015 as Amaszonas Paraguay, originally as a joint venture between Air Nostrum and Amaszonas. As Amaszonas Paraguay, the airline's first flight took place on 23 September 2015. On 19 June 2018, the airline announced its separation and independence from the Amaszonas group of airlines by rebranding the company as Paranair. The company's joint backers became Inversiones en Lineas Aereas Internacionales and Avmax Group Inc. from Spain and Canada respectively, with each company holding a 50% stake in Paranair. Operations under the Paranair name began on 15 October 2018.

Between July 2019 and February 2025 Paranair held a codeshare agreement with LATAM Paraguay.

== Destinations ==
As of September 2026, Paranair offers or has previously offered scheduled flights to the following destinations:

Country	City	Airport	Notes	Refs
Argentina	Buenos Aires	Aeroparque Jorge Newbery		
Argentina	Buenos Aires	Ministro Pistarini International Airport	Terminated	
Argentina	Córdoba	Ingeniero Aeronáutico Ambrosio L.V. Taravella International Airport	Terminated	
Argentina	Corrientes	Doctor Fernando Piragine Niveyro International Airport	Terminated	
Argentina	Salta	Martín Miguel de Güemes International Airport		
Argentina	San Salvador de Jujuy	Gobernador Horacio Guzmán International Airport		
Bolivia	Santa Cruz de la Sierra	Viru Viru International Airport		
Brazil	Brasília	Brasília International Airport^{a}	Terminated	
Brazil	Campinas	Viracopos International Airport	Terminated	
Brazil	Campo Grande	Campo Grande International Airport	Terminated	
Brazil	Curitiba	Afonso Pena International Airport	Terminated	
Brazil	Florianópolis	Hercílio Luz International Airport	Seasonal	
Brazil	Porto Alegre	Salgado Filho International Airport	Terminated	
Brazil	Rio de Janeiro	Rio de Janeiro/Galeão International Airport	Seasonal	
Brazil	São Paulo	São Paulo/Guarulhos International Airport	Terminated	
Chile	Iquique	Diego Aracena International Airport	Terminated	
Chile	Santiago	Arturo Merino Benítez International Airport	Terminated	
Paraguay	Asunción	Silvio Pettirossi International Airport	Hub	
Paraguay	Ciudad del Este	Guaraní International Airport	Terminated	
Peru	Lima	Jorge Chávez International Airport	Terminated	
Uruguay	Montevideo	Carrasco International Airport		
Uruguay	Punta del Este	Capitán de Corbeta Carlos A. Curbelo International Airport	Seasonal	
Uruguay	Rivera	Pres. Gral. Óscar D. Gestido Binational Airport	Terminated	
Uruguay	Salto	Nueva Hespérides International Airport	Terminated	

a. Route operated by Paranair on behalf of LATAM Paraguay as wet lease.

== Fleet ==
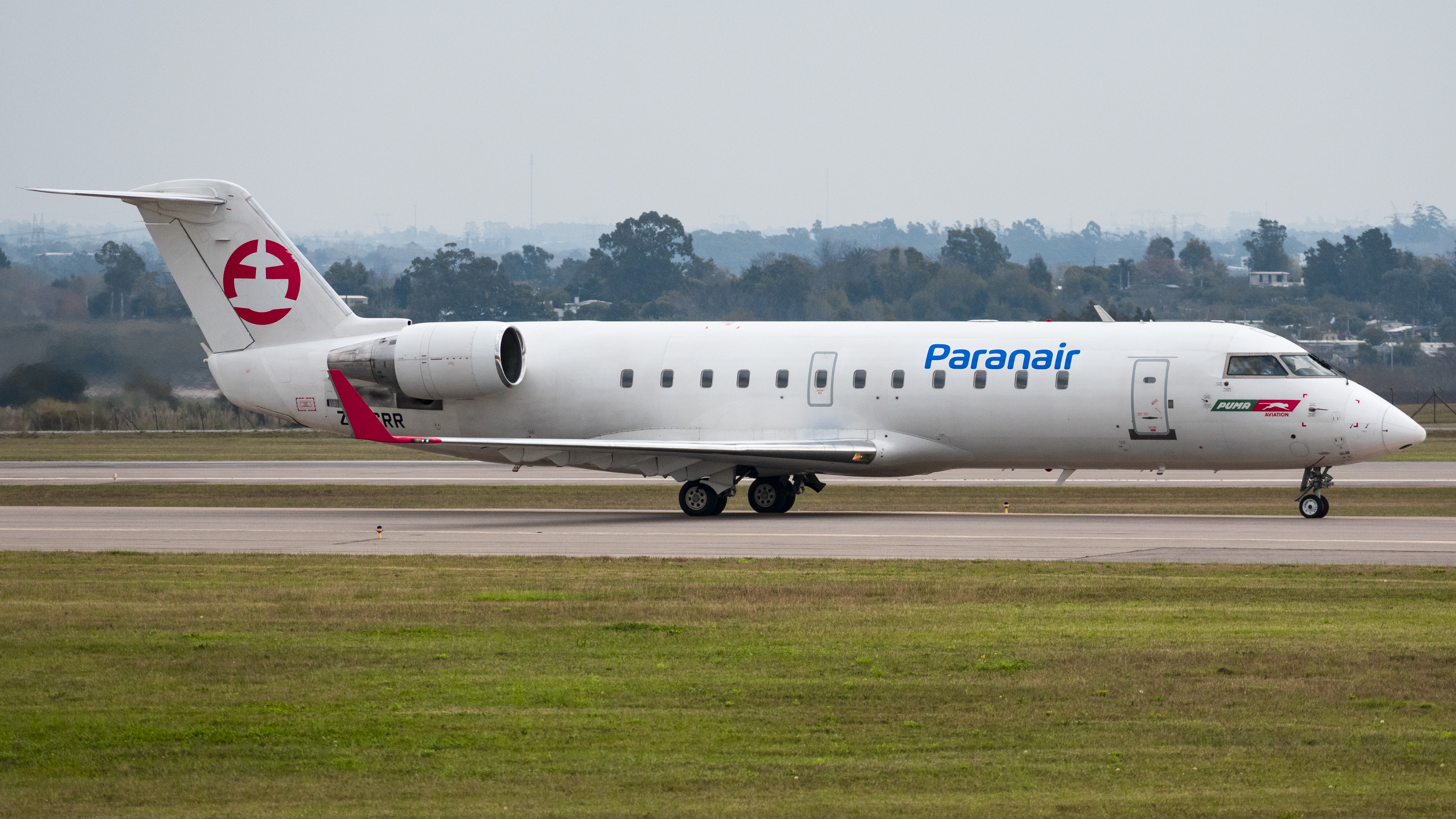
A Paranair Bombardier CRJ200 at Carrasco International Airport in 2019

=== Current fleet ===
As of August 2025, Paranair operates the following aircraft:

Paranair fleet
Aircraft	In service	Orders	Passengers	Notes
Bombardier CRJ200LR	3	—	50	
Total	3	—		

=== Former fleet ===
The following aircraft were previously operated by Paranair:

- 1 Bombardier CRJ100LR

== See also ==
- List of airlines of Paraguay
