= Luque =

Luque Lúke (Avañe'ẽ)
- City
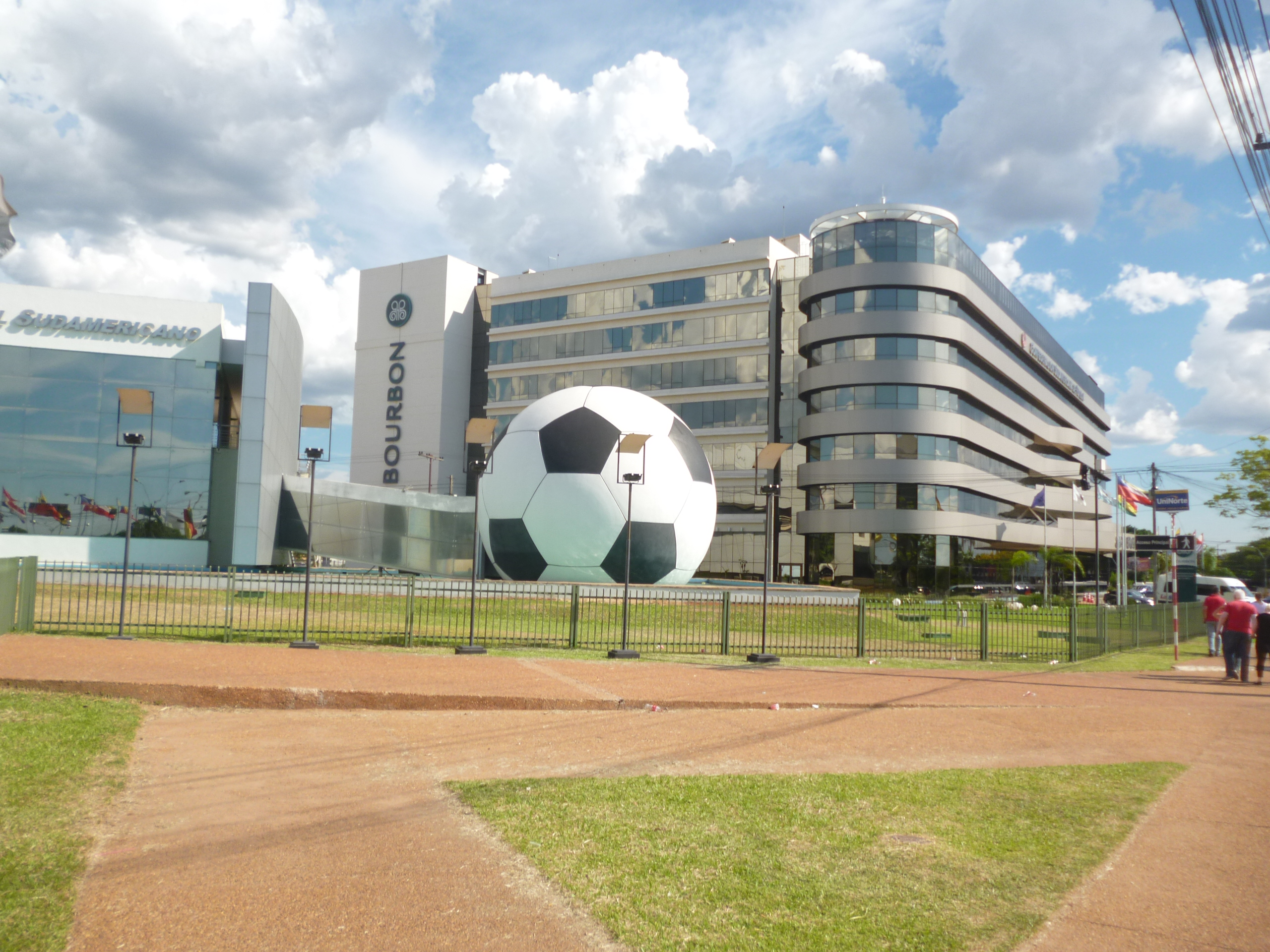
- Luque, Paraguay

- Flag

- Location within Paraguay
- Coordinates: 25°16′12″S 57°29′14″W
- Country: Paraguay
- Department: Central

Area
  - Total: 220 km^{2} (85 sq mi)
- Elevation: 120 m (390 ft)

Population (2016)
  - Total: 263,604
- Climate: Cfa

Luque (Spanish pronunciation: [ˈlu.ke]) is a city in Central Department of Paraguay, part of the Gran Asunción metropolitan area. Both 1635 and 1750 have been recorded as dates of its founding. It was temporarily the capital of Paraguay in 1868 during the Paraguayan War before relocation to San Estanislao. The city is home to Paraguay's main international airport, Silvio Pettirossi International Airport and the Ñu Guasú Park, which is where the Paraguayan Olympic Committee is also located.

The continental governing body of association football in South America, CONMEBOL, has its headquarters approximately 3 minutes from the airport, which hosts the South American Football Museum. The 2019 FIFA Beach Soccer World Cup took place in Luque. When it existed, ARPA – Aerolíneas Paraguayas had its headquarters in the ARPA Terminal on the grounds of the airport. It is a center of production of guitars and Paraguayan harps as well as Filigranas, gold and silver filigree jewelry including the seven-band ring Carretón de Siete Ramales.

== Toponymy ==
The name Luque is first mentioned in 1635, in an act of the Cabildo of Asunción when the colonial governor of the Governorate of Paraguay, Martín Ledesma de Valderrama, granted two leagues of land to a Spanish Captain named Miguel Antón de Luque in a place near Asunción known as las Salinas. According to the act this was the place where Captain Antón de Luque had been working an Encomienda for more than twenty years.

A century later, in 1743, another Miguel de Luque, a descendant of the first mentioned, made a donation by testament of a section of those lands to the Franciscans who built a chapel for the devotion of the Virgin of the Rosary in 1750 - 1755, and from that time the old name of Salinas was changed to Valle de Luque.

In 1781, governor Pedro Melo de Portugal made the first administrative division of the Governorate of Paraguay into six towns and designated the district with the name Partido de Luque.

== Geography ==
The city of Luque extends from Ypacaraí Lake to the western bank of the Paraguay River.

Luque is located to the East of Asunción and borders the following cities:

- To the North with Mariano Roque Alonso, Limpio and Nueva Colombia
- To the South with Fernando de la Mora and San Lorenzo
- To the East with Areguá
- To the West with Asunción
- To the Southeast with Capiatá

== Demography ==
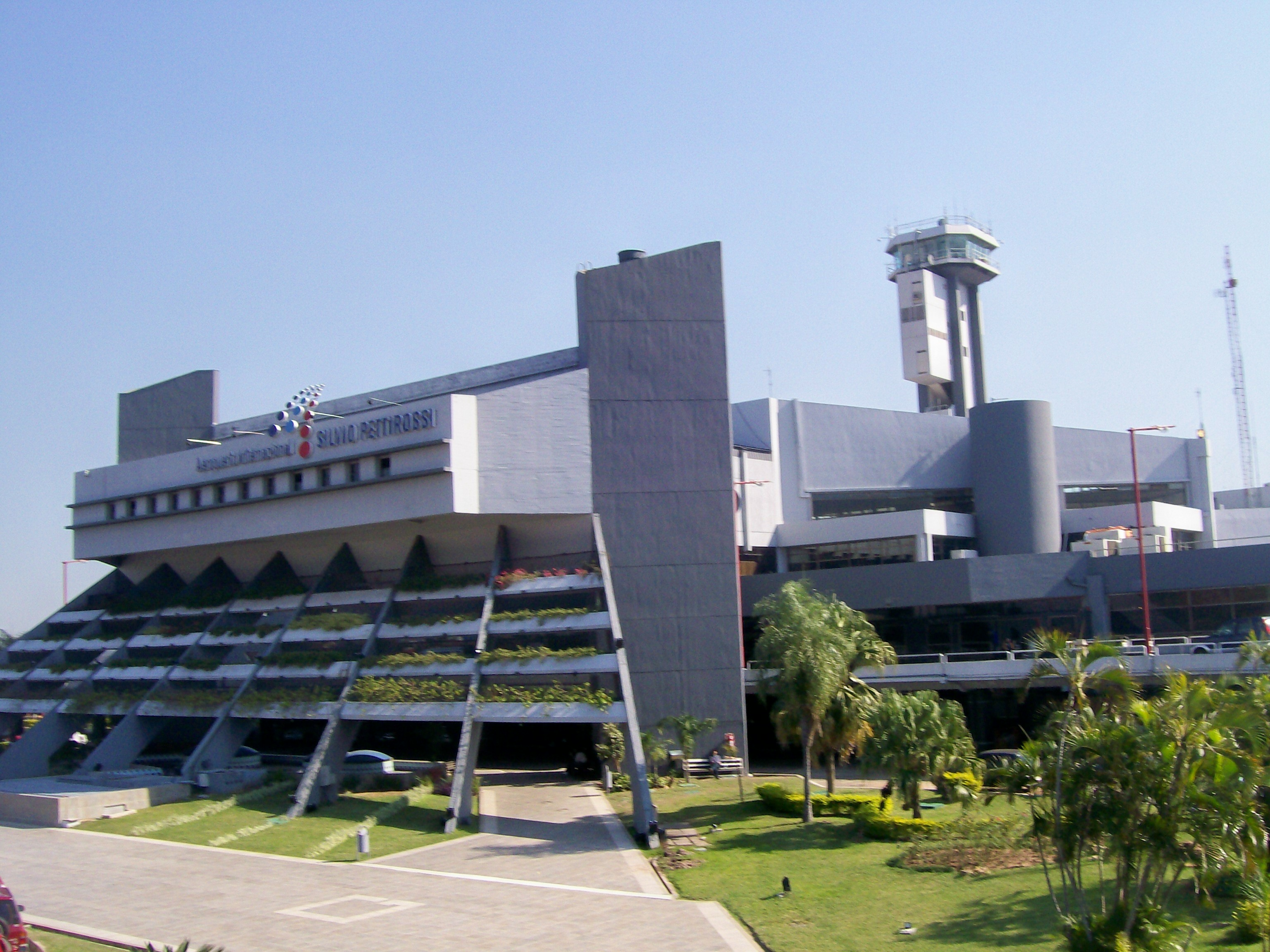
Silvio Pettirossi International Airport at Luque.

Luque is the third-most populated city of Paraguay, after the capital city and Ciudad del Este. It is the most populated city of the Central Department of Paraguay.

== Twin towns ==
Luque is twinned with:

- Ituzaingó, Buenos Aires, Argentina
- San Juan Bautista, Paraguay
- Luque, Spain

== Notable people ==
- José Luis Chilavert
- Julio Cesar Romero
- Egni Eckert
- Raúl Vicente Amarilla
- Pablo César Aguilar
- Osvaldo Martínez
- Hilarión Osorio

== Gallery ==
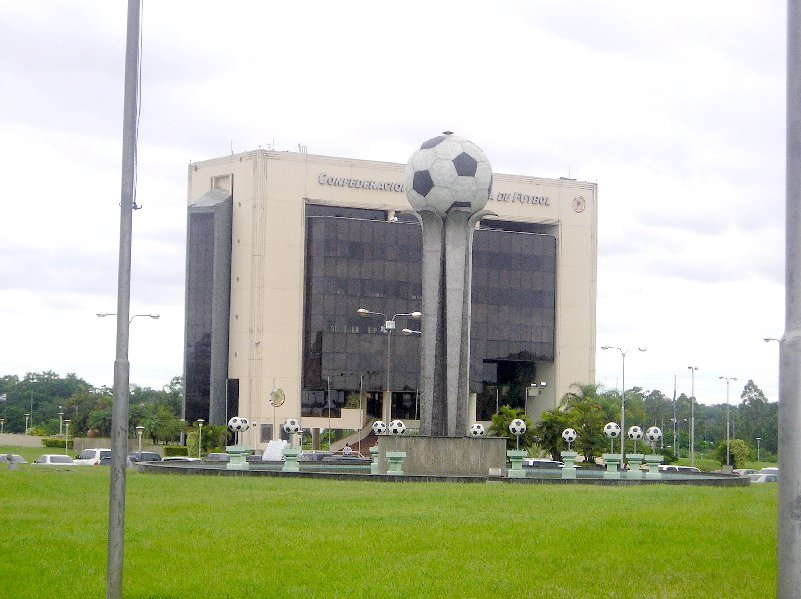
CONMEBOL Headquarters, in Luque, Paraguay

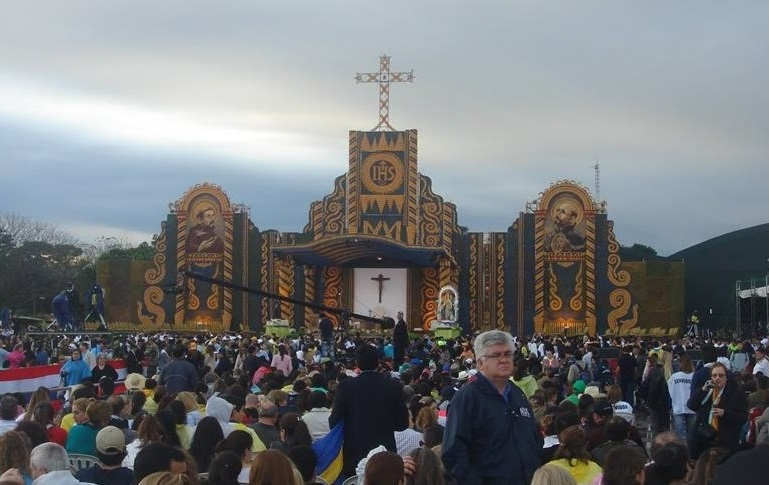
The main altarpiece made of maize, calabaza and coconut, especially for the 2015 visit by Pope Francis to Paraguay, in Luque

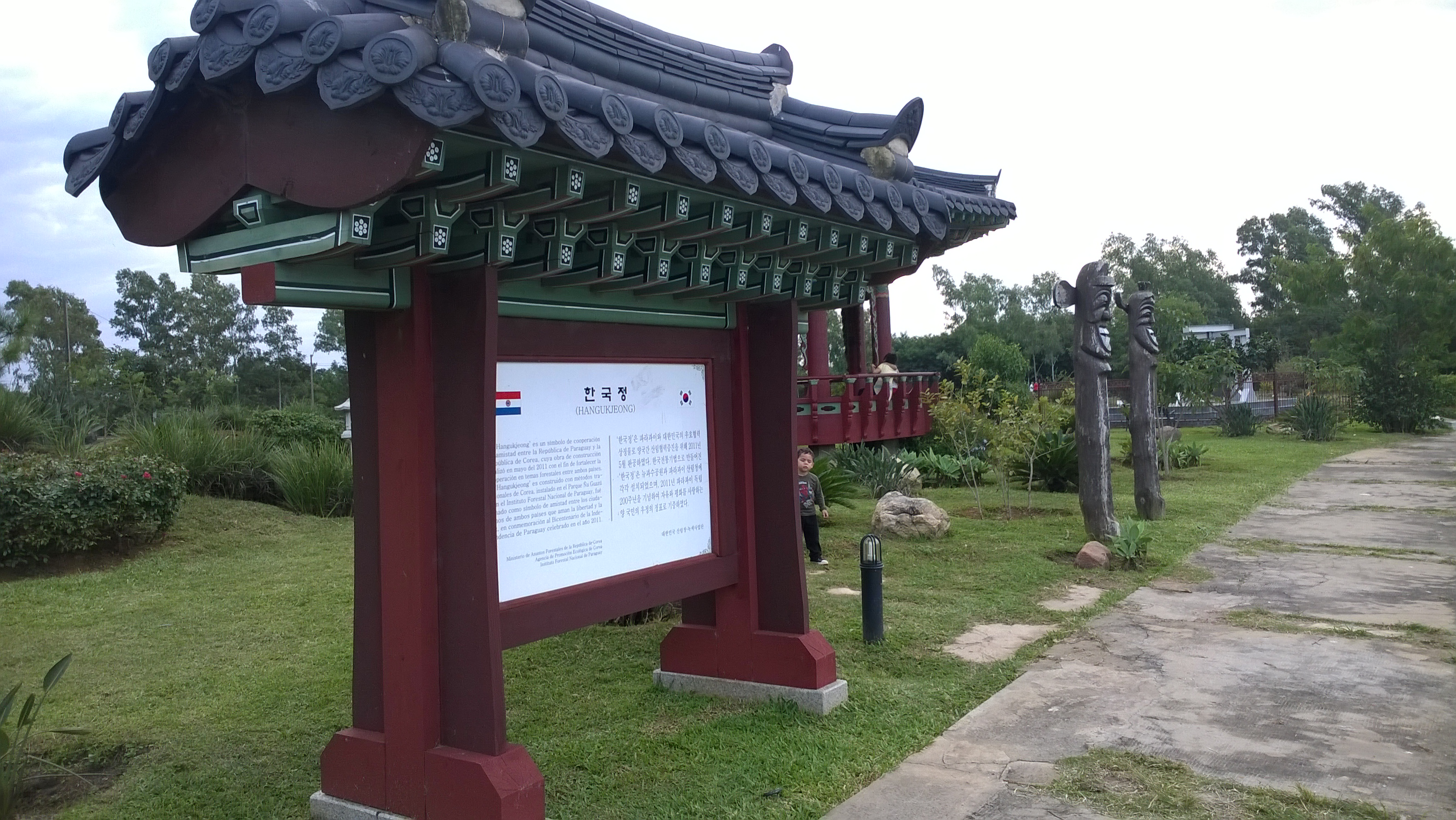
The Paraguay-South Korea Cooperation Monument, in Luque

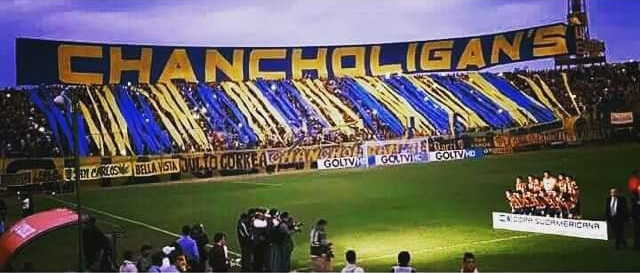
Chanchohooligans, one of many Sportivo Luqueño's groups of fans

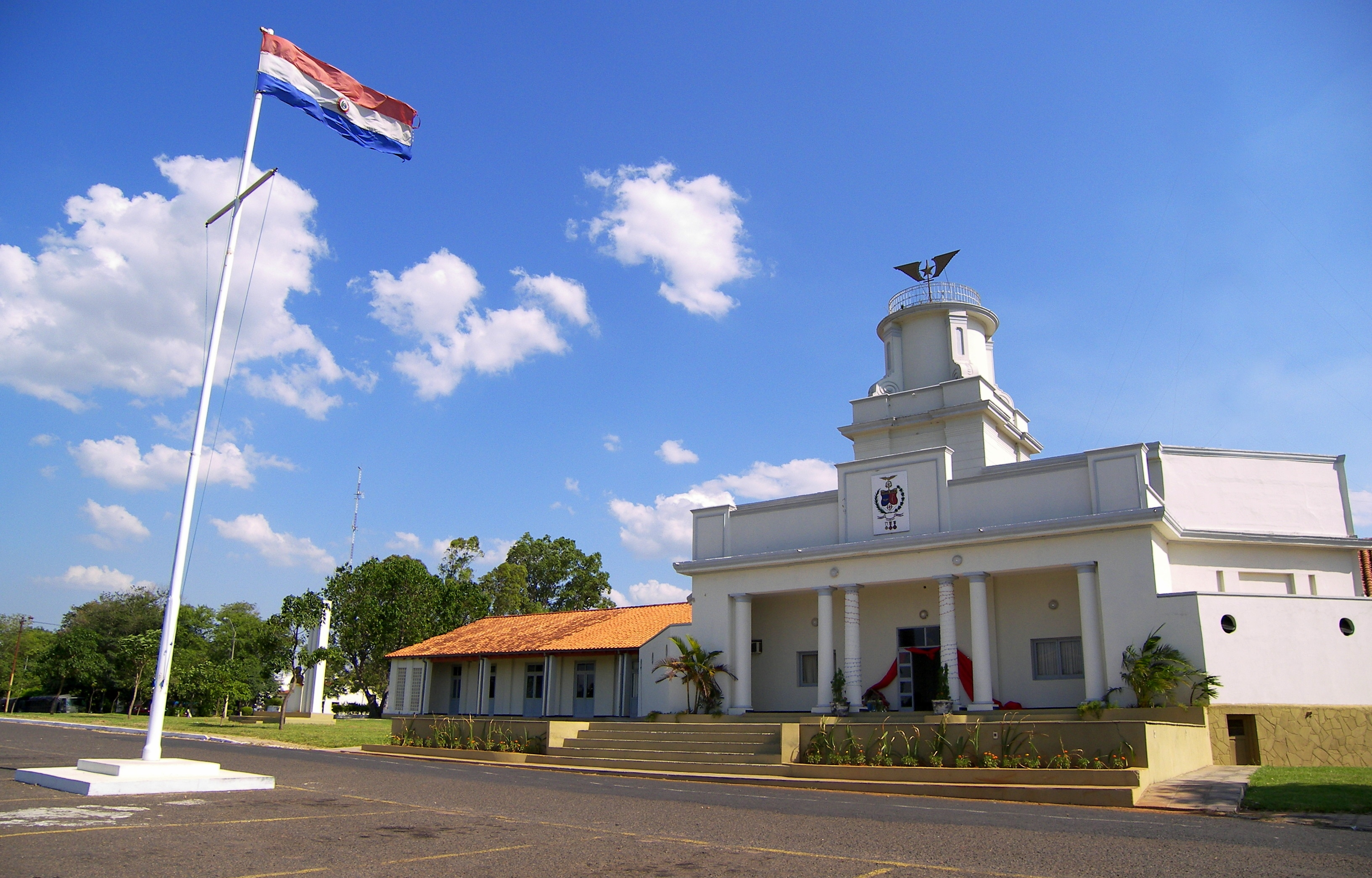
Paraguayan Air Force, in Luque

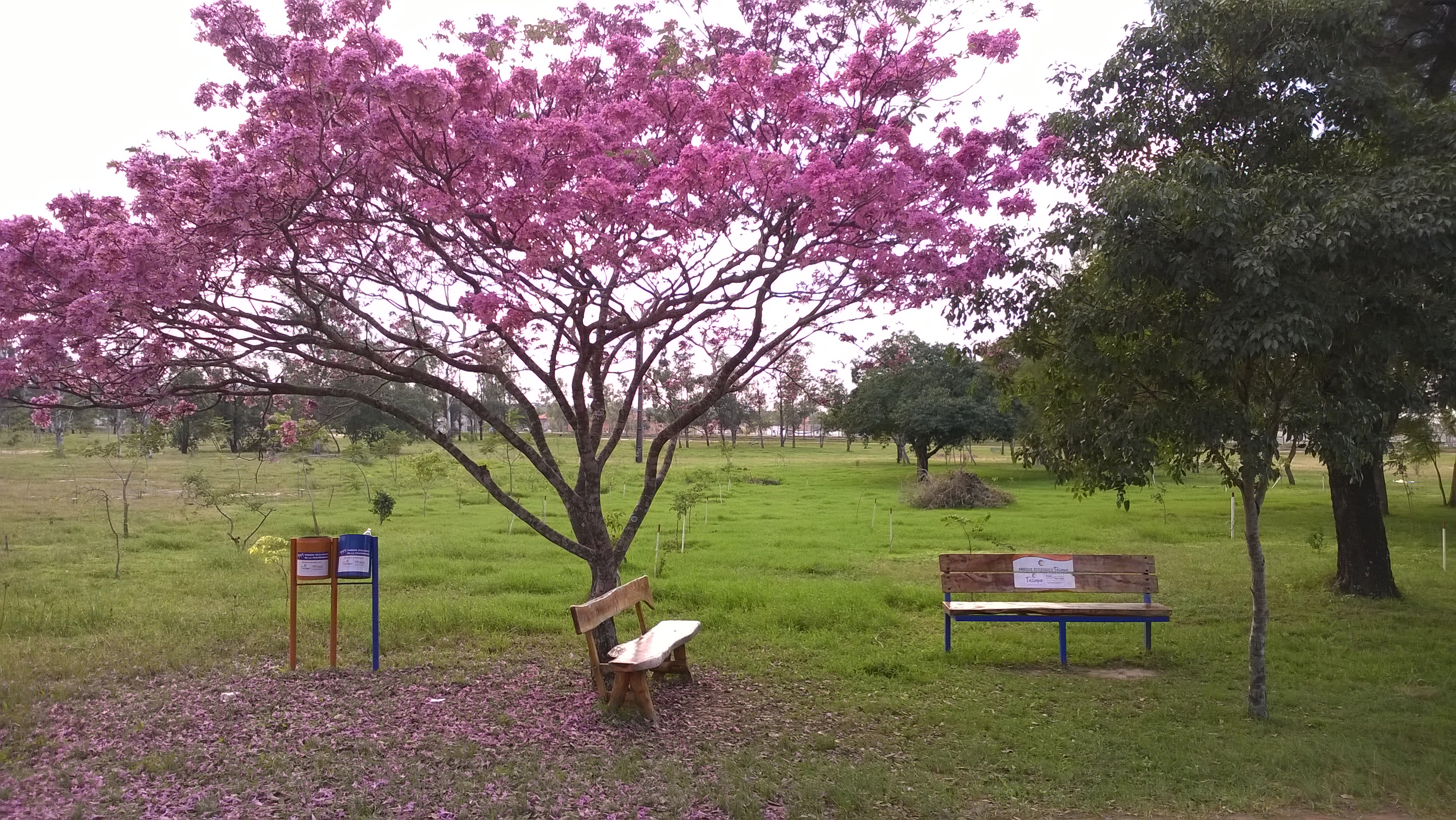
A Tajy at Ñu Guasú Park, Luque, Paraguay

== See also ==
- Ñu Guasú Park
- List of municipalities in Córdoba
