= Capitán Miranda =

- district
- Location within Paraguay
- Coordinates: 27°12′0″S 55°48′0″W
- Country: Paraguay
- Department: Itapúa

Population (2008)
  - Total: 3 065

Capitán Miranda is a town in the Itapúa Department of Paraguay, about 15 km north of the department capital Encarnación.

The Teniente Amin Ayub Gonzalez Airport is located just west of the town.

== Sources ==
- World Gazeteer: Paraguay – World-Gazetteer.com
