= Líneas Aéreas Paraguayas =

National airline of Paraguay (1962–1996)

Líneas Aéreas Paraguayas S.A.

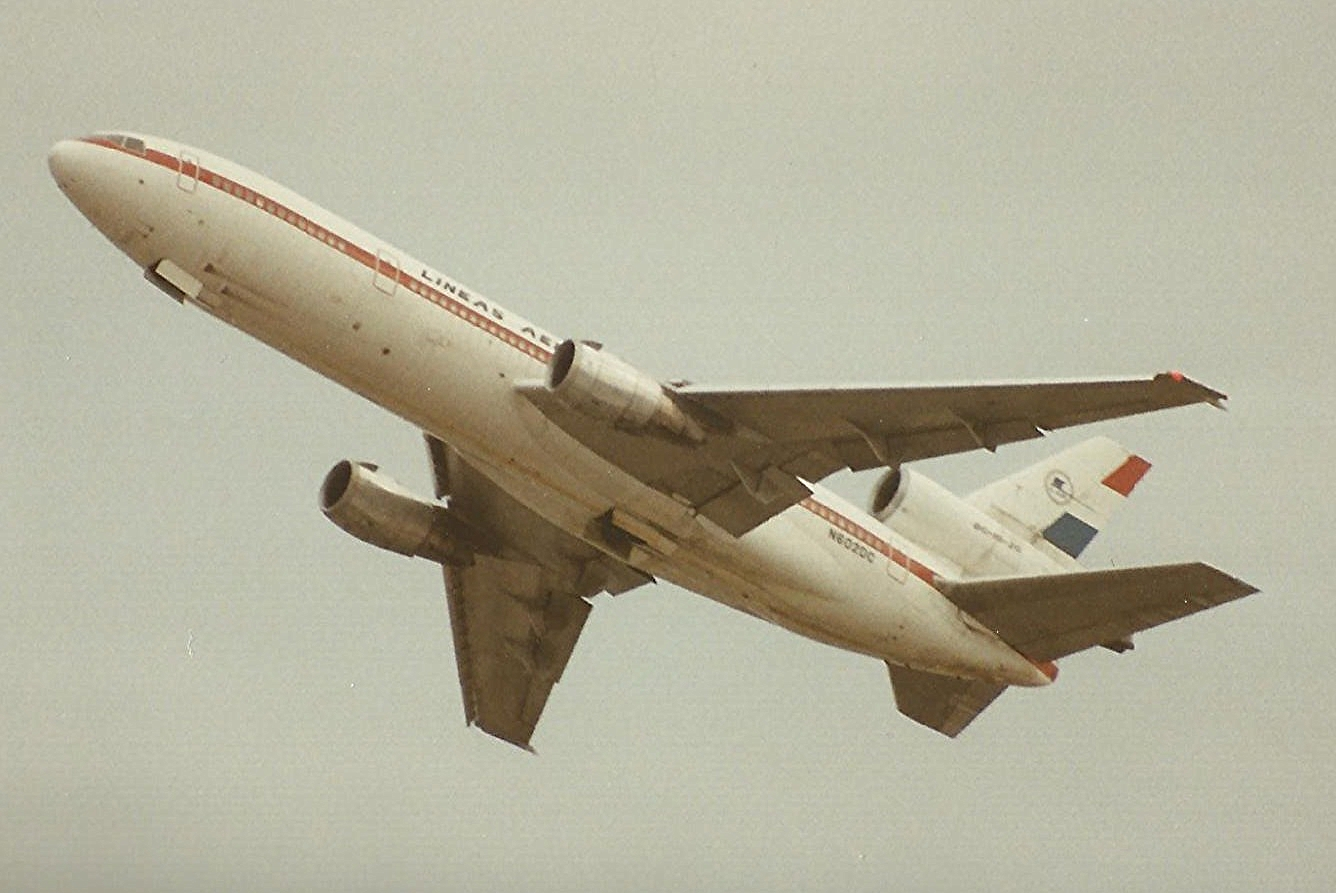
- DC 10 of LAP taking off
IATA	ICAO	Call sign
PZ	LAP	PARAGUAYA
- Founded: November 17, 1962
- Commenced operations: August 20, 1963
- Ceased operations: October 6, 1996
- Hubs: Silvio Pettirossi International Airport
- Fleet size: 6
- Destinations: 30
- Parent company: SAETA (1995-1996)
- Headquarters: Asunción, Paraguay
- Founder: Adrian Jara

LAP - Líneas Aéreas Paraguayas (also referred to as LAP and later LAPSA Air Paraguay) was a Paraguayan airline that was founded in November 1962 to be the flag carrier airline of Paraguay. Its main hub was Silvio Pettirossi International Airport, in Asunción. The airline ceased operations in 1996 after being sold to TAM Linhas Aéreas.

== History ==
=== Early operations ===
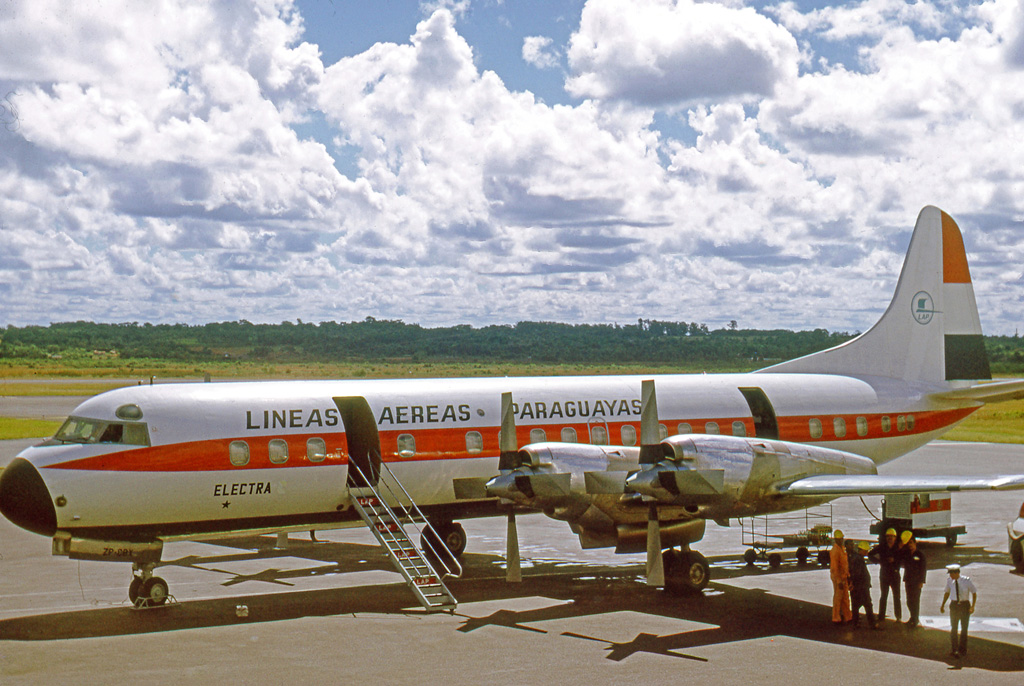
A Líneas Aéreas Paraguayas Lockheed L-188C Electra at Silvio Pettirossi International Airport in 1975

LAP was a creation of the Paraguayan Military Aviation on November 17, 1962. It was officially founded by the government through the Decree Nr.337 of March 18, 1963. It began services on August 20, 1963, using three Convair CV-240. Services included flights to Rio de Janeiro, Buenos Aires, Montevideo, São Paulo and Curitiba from the Paraguayan capital of Asunción. The airline was going well up until May 23 1967 when ZP-CDP crashed without fatality. Flights to Brazil were effected and as a result The CV-240s were replaced by three Lockheed L-188C Electra turboprops, which were acquired from Eastern Air Lines in 1969, and were operated for over 20 years.

On February 26, 1969, the airline began regular operation, with three weekly frequencies for São Paulo. Once a week, the flight continued to Rio de Janeiro, before returning to Asunción. In 1970, service started to Santa Cruz de la Sierra, Resistencia and Salta with a Douglas C-47 transferred from the Military Air Transport of the FAP. In 1972, La Paz, Bolivia was added to LAP's network. In 1973 a route to Lima was inaugurated and in 1978 to Santiago.

=== Jet operations ===
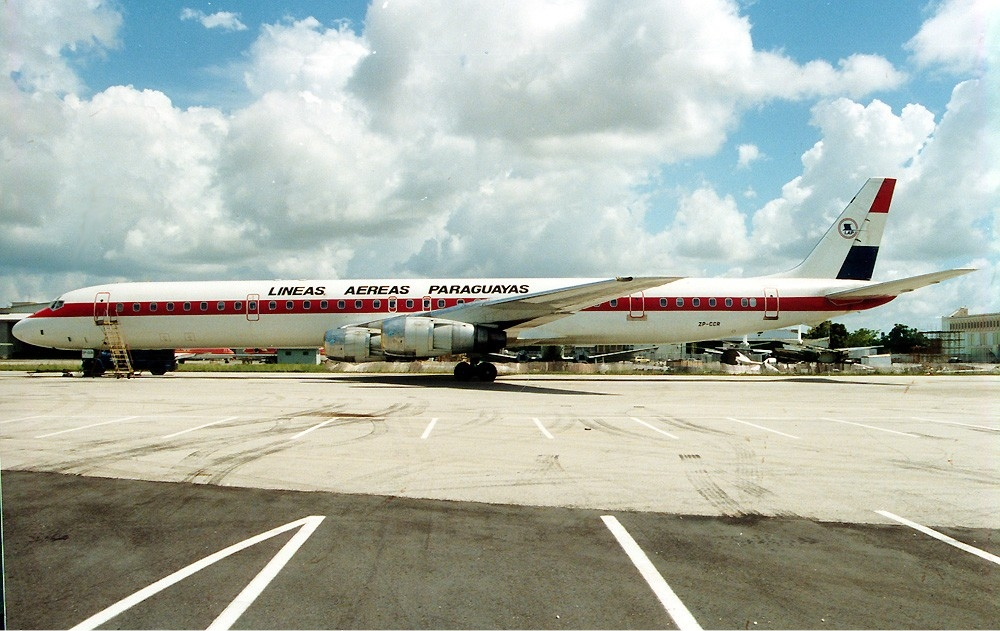
A Líneas Aéreas Paraguayas Douglas DC-8-61 at Miami International Airport in 1989

The good service offered by the Lockheed Electras made LAP have a presence in Latin America. By March 1977, the number of weekly frequencies for Brazil had already increased. The pure jet age came in 1978 with the purchase of two Boeing 707-320 from Pan Am and with those services to Miami began. The airline had an excellent safety record and established a presence in Latin America and two Boeing 707 aircraft were bought from Pan Am with ZP-CCE being the first of these aircraft. On November 16, 1978 the airline added the Asunción-Lima-Miami route with flight 700 on this route and flight 701 on the return route respectively. In 1979, services started to Madrid and Frankfurt. When another 707 was bought in 1982, service to Brussels also started as a result. ZP-CCG, a DC 3 joined the fleet in the 1970s.

Due to noise restrictions that came into effect in 1985 a former Air Canada DC-8-63 was bought in 1984 for the route to Miami which was put in service on New Years of 1985. During the 1980s, other routes were tried like Mexico City and Panama City, but just for a few months. In 1988, a former Spantax DC-8-61 was bought. In 1990, it was replaced by a leased DC-8-62 for a few months.

On February 2, 1989, General Andrés Rodríguez of the Paraguayan Army carried out a coup d'état, putting an end to the dictatorial government of General Alfredo Stroessner. A short time later, the changes that took place in the country would reach LAP. Audits revealed that there were other officials and the quality of LAP's services was deteriorating. The president ordered in 1989 that the airline be maintained using its own income. In 1990, LAP received a former United Airlines DC-8-71, followed by another similar aircraft in 1991.

In 1992, a McDonnell Douglas DC-10-30 came into service. Eventually, LAP received two more DC-10s, one former Air France for a few months and a former Varig. Operations to the US and Europe were performed by the DC-10s and regional flights with a 707 and the DC-8. In 1993, and for a few months, a BAe 146-300 was leased and operated on loan from the factory. Since LAP was a government-losing company, attempts to privatize were not fruitful and the money-losing operation was shut down on March 8, 1994.

=== Restart and end ===
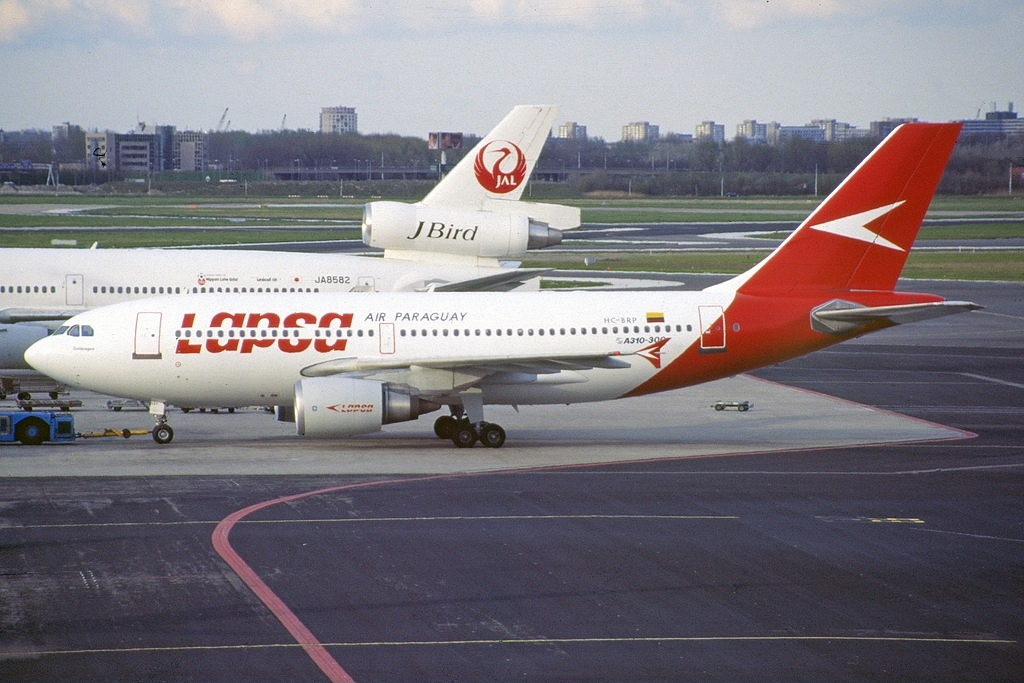
A LAPSA Airbus A310-300 at Amsterdam Airport Schiphol in 1995

In October 1994, LAP was privatized and sold to Ecuadorian airline SAETA, forming an Ecuadorian-Paraguayan Consortium, and restarted operations on February 7, 1995, under the new name, LAPSA Air Paraguay with two Boeing 737-200, three Airbus A320-200, and one Airbus A310-300, all operated by SAETA.

On September 1, 1996, Aerolíneas Paraguayas, a Paraguayan regional subsidiary of TAM Linhas Aéreas, purchased 80% of the majority shares of LAPSA, which by then both airlines were merged under the name TAM – Transportes Aéreos del Mercosur. It was then sold to TAM Linhas Aéreas on October 6, which used two Fokker 100s to cover its regional destinations. However, routes to Miami and Europe never restarted afterward. In 2008, TAM Mercosur was renamed as TAM Paraguay, which continues to operate today under the LATAM brand.

=== Relaunch attempts ===
On August 3, 2020, the director of the Dirección Nacional de Aeronáutica Civil, Félix Kanazawa, announced that the state had reacquired the company and consequently its routes in the Americas, the United States and Europe. Kanazawa also mentioned that a decision has not yet been made on whether the company will be 100% state-owned, but has announced that a possible reactivation of the defunct Paraguayan flag airline is being considered.

In November 2021, Nella Linhas Aéreas announced its strategy of expanding operations in several Latin American countries with the re-launch of LAP. The airline was expected to return to service in March 2022 under the name LAP by Nella, with two Boeing 737-800s. As of July 2024, this has not happened yet.

== Destinations ==
=== Central and South America ===
Argentina

- Buenos Aires (Ministro Pistarini International Airport)
- Jujuy (Gobernador Horacio Guzmán International Airport)
- Resistencia (Resistencia International Airport)
- Salta (Martín Miguel de Güemes International Airport)

Bolivia

- La Paz (El Alto International Airport)
- Santa Cruz de la Sierra (Viru Viru International Airport)

Brazil

- Curitiba (Afonso Pena International Airport)
- Rio de Janeiro (Rio de Janeiro/Galeão International Airport)
- Recife (Recife/Guararapes–Gilberto Freyre International Airport)
- São Paulo (São Paulo/Guarulhos International Airport)

Chile

- Iquique (Diego Aracena International Airport)
- Santiago (Arturo Merino Benítez International Airport)

Colombia

- Bogotá (El Dorado International Airport)

Ecuador

- Guayaquil (José Joaquín de Olmedo International Airport)

Panama

- Panama City (Tocumen International Airport)

Paraguay

- Asunción (Silvio Pettirossi International Airport) Hub

Peru

- Lima (Jorge Chávez International Airport)

Uruguay

- Montevideo (Carrasco International Airport)

=== Europe ===
Belgium

- Brussels (Brussels Airport)

Germany

- Frankfurt (Frankfurt Airport)

Italy

- Rome (Rome-Fiumicino Airport)

Netherlands

- Amsterdam (Amsterdam Airport Schiphol)

Spain

- Madrid (Madrid-Barajas International Airport)
- Tenerife (Tenerife South Airport)

=== North America ===
Canada

- Toronto (Toronto Pearson International Airport)

United States

- Miami (Miami International Airport)
- New York City (John F. Kennedy International Airport)

Mexico

- Mexico City (Mexico City International Airport)

== Fleet ==
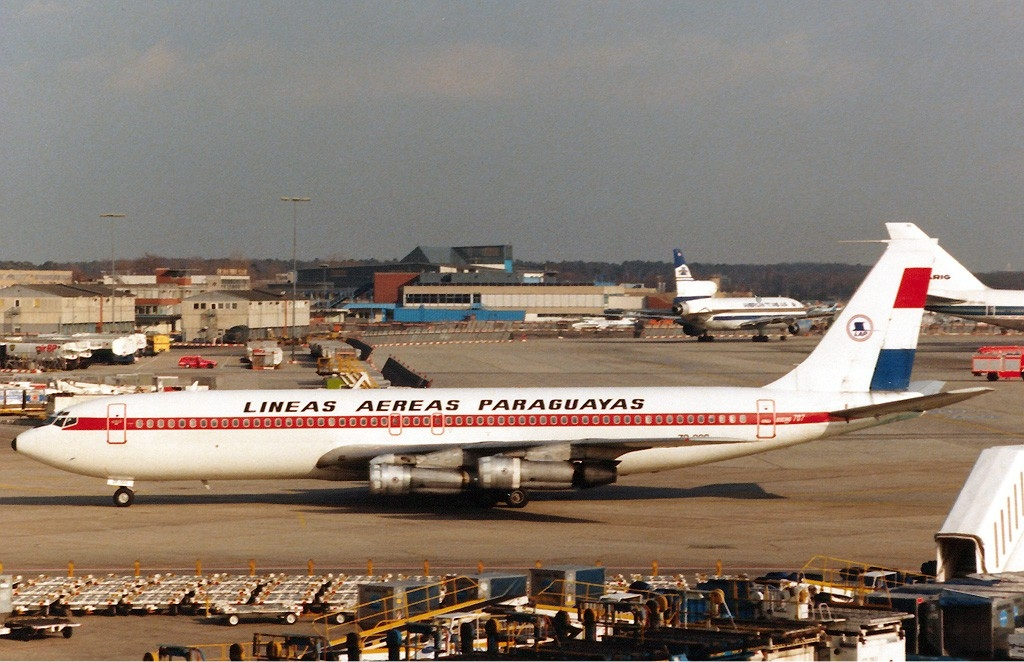
A Líneas Aéreas Paraguayas Boeing 707-320B taxiing at Frankfurt Airport in 1988

LAP used throughout the years the following aircraft:

LAP / LAPSA fleet
Aircraft	Total	Introduced	Retired	Notes
Airbus A310-300	1	1995	1996	Operated from SAETA
Airbus A320-200	3	1995	1996	Operated by SAETA
Boeing 707-320B	3	1978	1994	
Boeing 737-200	2	1995	1996	Leased from SAETA
British Aerospace BAe 146-300	1	1992	1993	Leased from British Aerospace
Convair CV-240	3	1963	1972	
Douglas C-47 Skytrain	1	1972	1977	
Douglas C-54 Skymaster	2	1963	1964	
Douglas DC-8-61	1	1988	1990	
Douglas DC-8-62	2	1990	1991	
Douglas DC-8-63	1	1984	1994	
Douglas DC-8-71	2	1990	1993	One former LAP DC-8 crashed in 2000
Lockheed L-188C Electra	3	1968	1994	
McDonnell Douglas DC-10-30	3	1992	1994	

== Accidents and incidents ==
- On May 26, 1967, a Convair CV-240 (registered ZP-CDP) was approaching runway 10 of the Ministro Pistarini International Airport. The aircraft suddenly nosed down and crashed its left wing and broke off, the aircraft skidded onto the runway and came to rest upside down. All 24 occupants onboard survived.
- On May 8, 1969, a Convair CV-240 (registered ZP-CDN) was destroyed in a collision after a Pilatus PC-6 Porter (registered N356F) was doing a demonstration flight with one pilot on board and three passengers, two of them were high-ranking military officials. Everyone on board the PC-6 were killed, while no one was on board the CV-240.

== See also ==
- List of defunct airlines of Paraguay
- LATAM Airlines Paraguay
