= Ñu Guasú Park =

Park in Luque, Paraguay

Parque Ñu Guasú
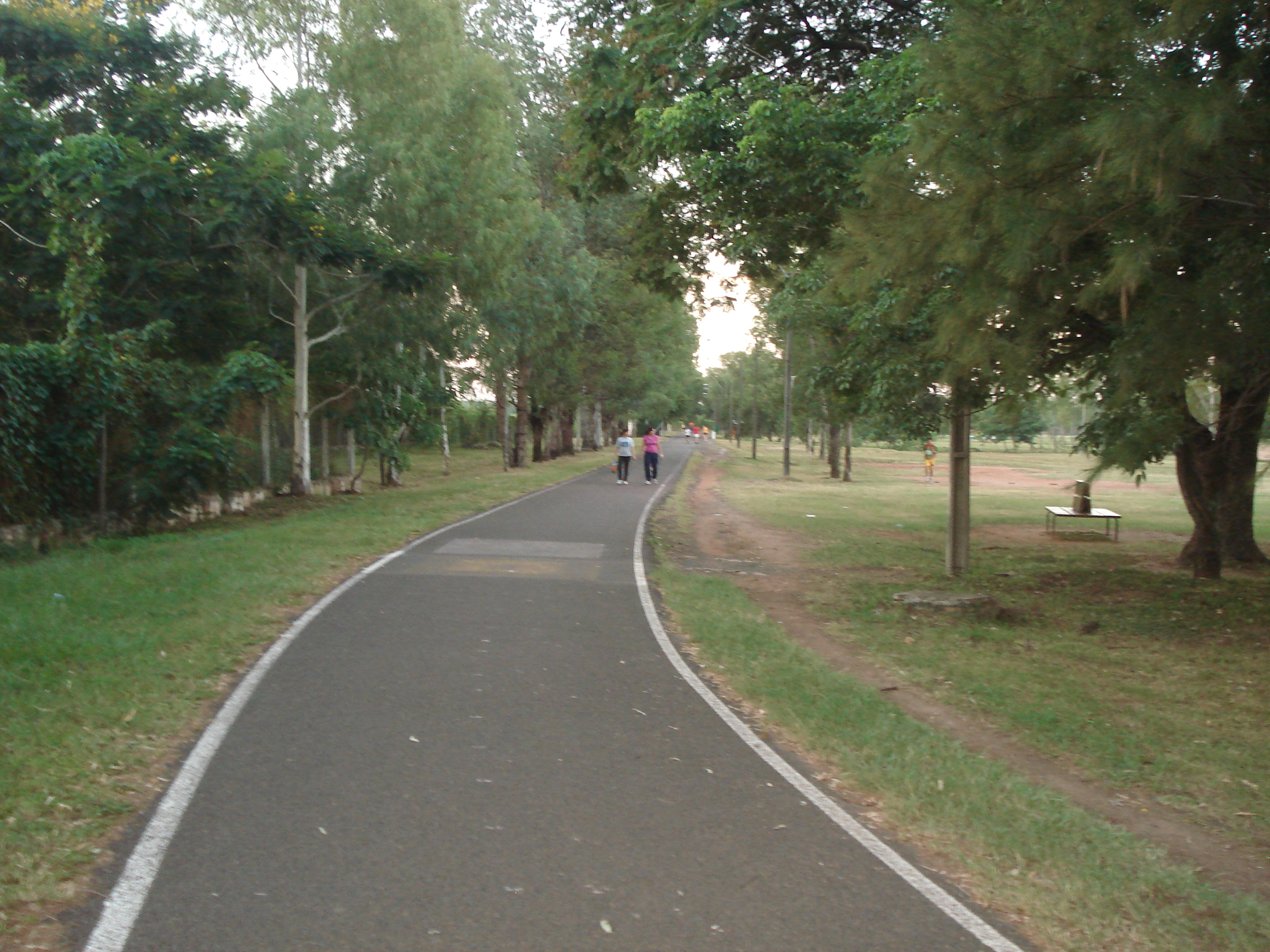
- Interactive map of Parque Ñu Guasú
- Type: Urban park
- Location: Luque, Paraguay
- Coordinates: 25°15′52″S 57°32′10″W
- Area: 25 acres (0.10 km^{2})
- Owner: Communications and Public Constructions Ministry
- Status: Open all year

The Ñu Guasú Park (Spanish: Parque Ñu Guasú) is an urban park located in Luque, in the Greater Asuncion area, in Paraguay, near the Silvio Pettirossi International Airport. It was turned into a recreational park covering 25 hectares. It is maintained through the Communications and Public Constructions Ministry of Paraguay, through the Public Constructions Direction, dependent of the Vice-Ministry. Ñu Guasú Park has a 5-kilometer walking/jogging path and a 1.2 kilometer bicycle path. It also has soccer, volleyball, basketball, and tennis facilities. There is no fee charged to enter the park.

== History ==
=== 2000s ===
Between 2001 and 2005, Parque Ñu Guazú was the site of several high-profile security incidents. The Ejército del Pueblo Paraguayo kidnapped María Edith Bordón de Debernardi at the park in November 2001, and former model Mariángela Martinez Houstin was abducted there in March 2003. In March 2005, an employee of the Paraguayan Embassy in Buenos Aires was robbed in the parking lot.

Later years saw a shift toward community and environmental events. Following a minor grass fire in September 2008, the park hosted the Gran Corrida Americana race in October to raise funds for the Paraguayan Chaco. The following month, the WWF held its first volunteer tree-planting day at the site. In 2009, the Bosque de la Memoria (Forest of Memory) was inaugurated.

=== 2020s ===
On 5 April 2021, the Parque Ñu Guazú re-opened its doors following the COVID-19 pandemic.
