= World Trade Center Asunción =

Building complex in Paraguay

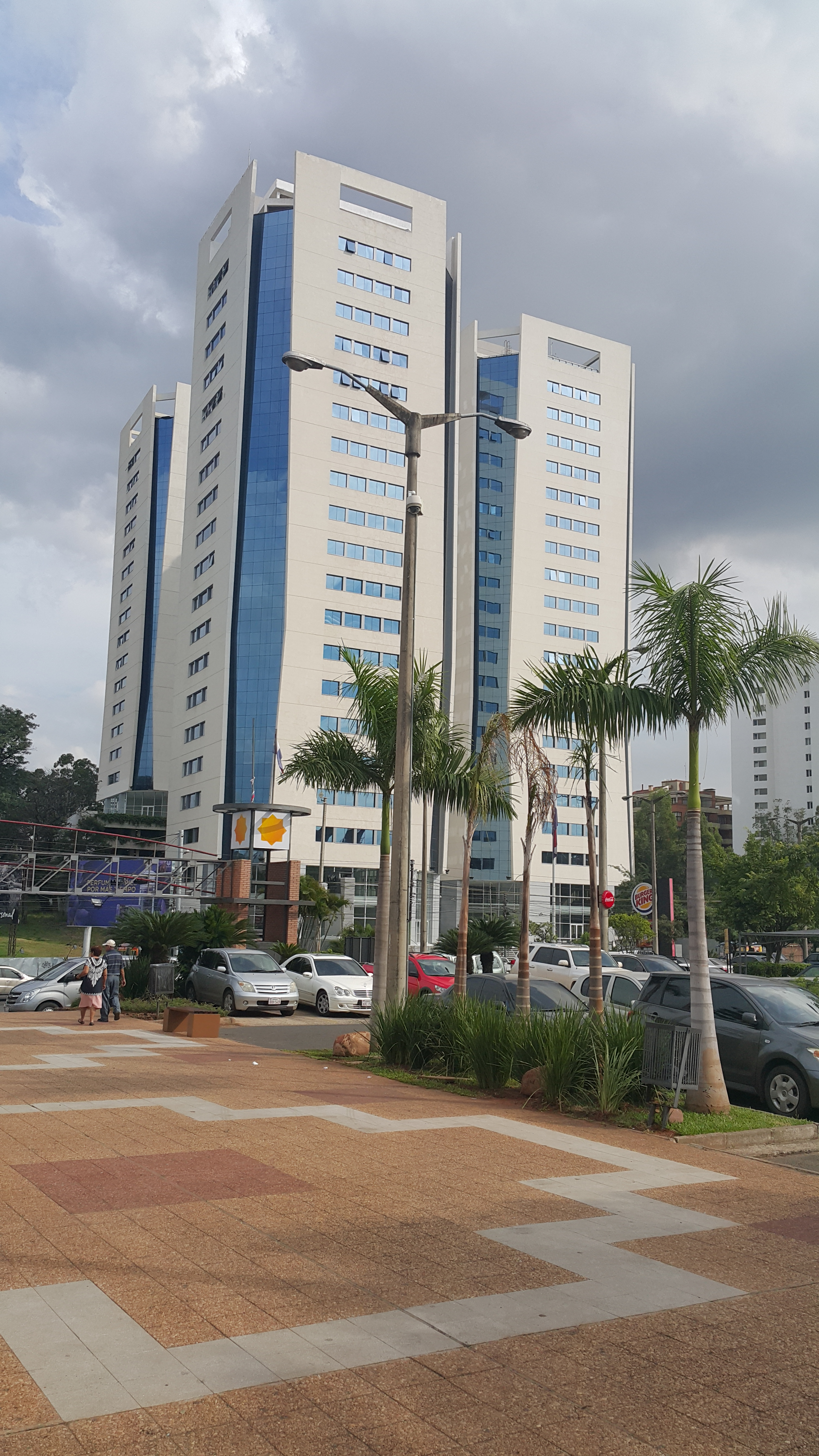
- Interactive map of the World Trade Center Asunción area

General information
- Status: Completed
- Type: Offices; Gastronomy and Commercial premises
- Location: Asunción, Paraguay
- Coordinates: 25°17′04.00″S 57°34′02.00″W
- Construction started: November, 2011
- Opening: December, 2015
- Cost: 77,000,000 USD

Technical details
- Floor count: 20 each building

Design and construction
- Architects: Victor González Acosta & Randy Wood
- Developer: Capitalis
- Main contractor: GA&W

The World Trade Center Asunción (WTC Asunción) is a building complex located in Asunción, Paraguay. It was officially opened on December 14 2015.

== Location ==
Located in the heart of a new corporate center of Asunción, consists of 4 towers of 20 floors each, with a total area of over 83,000 m2 and over 900 parking spaces.

== Complex ==
The architectural design contributes to sustainable development of the city, achieving maximum comfort with minimum energy costs, optimizing natural resources and promoting the proper energy balance of the building to its integration with the environment and its inhabitants.
