= TAM Aviação Executiva =

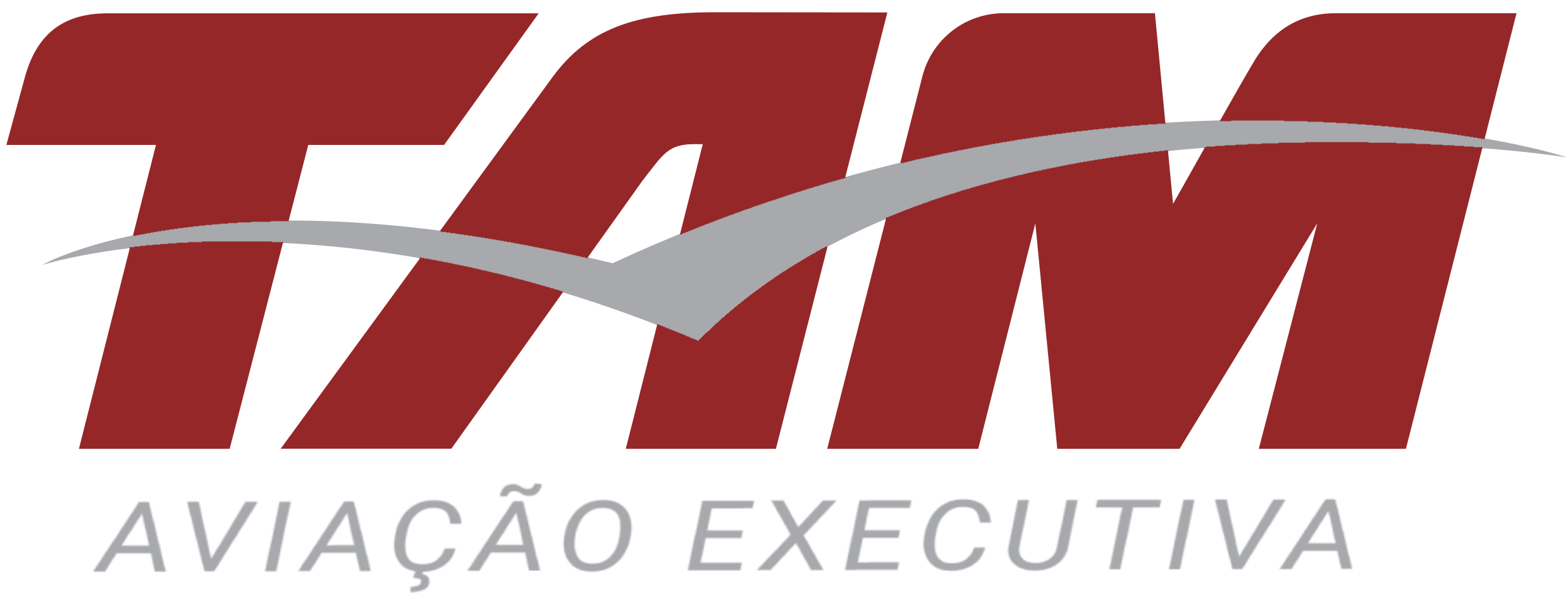

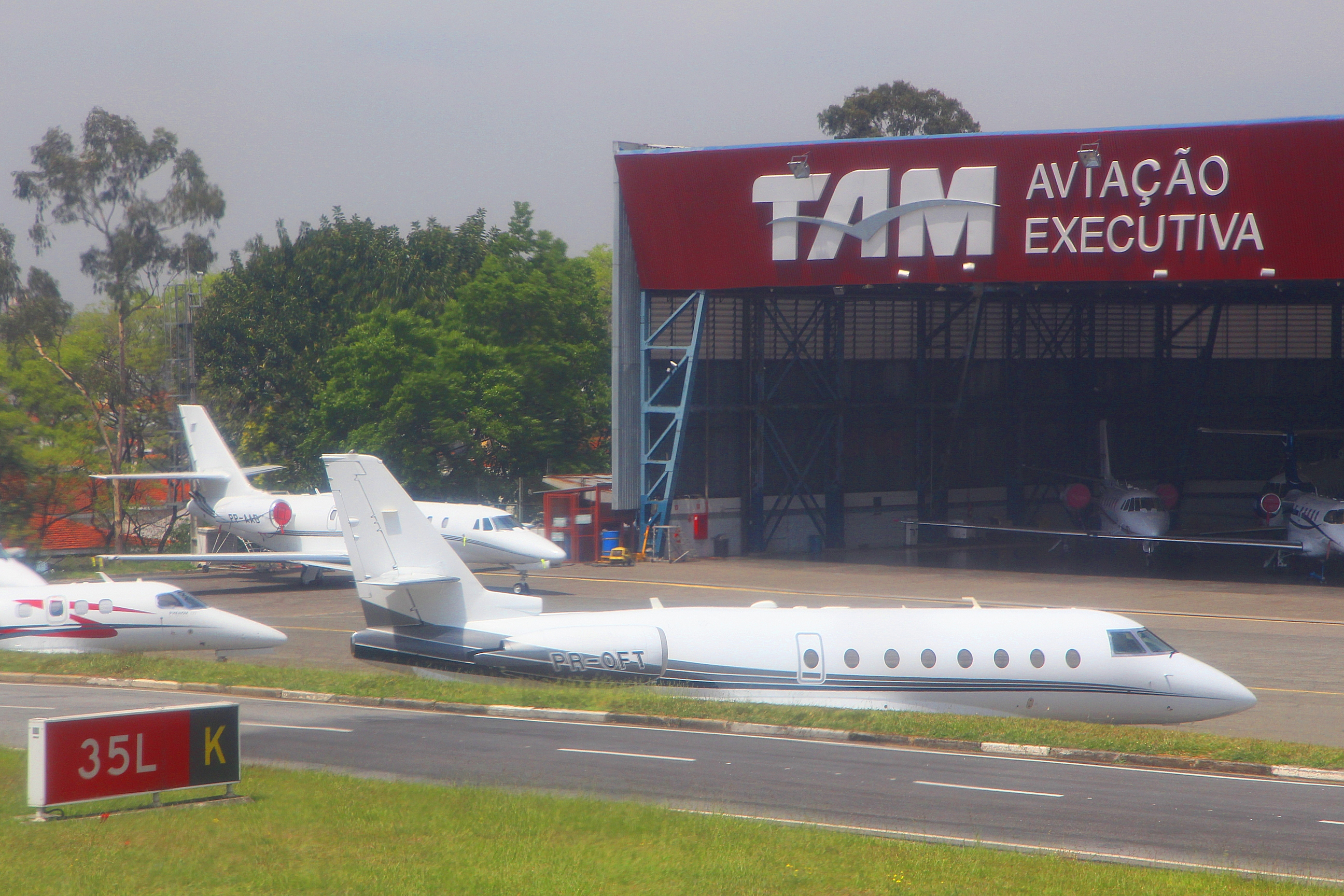
- Founded: February 21, 1961
- Operating bases: Aracati; Belo Horizonte; Jundiaí; Manaus; São Paulo
- Fleet size: 9
- Headquarters: São Paulo, Brazil
- Website: www.tamaviacaoexecutiva.com.br

TAM Aviação Executiva (formerly TAM – Táxi Aéreo Marília) is a Brazilian airline specialized in air charter, aircraft sales and aircraft maintenance. It was founded in 1961 by Rolim Amaro and it is still entirely owned by the Amaro family and thus not a subsidiary of TAM Airlines, though part of the TAM Group. In 1976 TAM Executiva provided support for the start-up of TAM Airlines.

== History ==
TAM – Táxi Aéreo Marília and TAM - Transportes Aéreos Regionais were two different judicial entities, though belonging to the same TAM Group. TAM - Marília provided the experience needed for the start-up of TAM - Regionais.

TAM can trace its origins to TAM - Táxi Aéreo Marília an air-taxi company founded on February 21, 1961, by five pilots. The company was named 'after the pilots' hometown of Marília, in the state of São Paulo. It began operations with 4 Cessna 180 and a single Cessna 170, ferrying cargo and passengers across Paraná, São Paulo and Mato Grosso states.

In 1964 Orlando Ometto, owner of agricultural ventures in the region, purchased a 50% stake in the company, with the intent of using its aircraft and pilots to support his agricultural projects central Brazil. With the capital, TAM purchased aircraft. Later, the original owners left the company and Ometto purchased their share of the company, eventually reaching full-ownership.

In 1966, the company bought twin-engined aircraft models, including the Piper Aztec, Piper Navajo and the Rockwell Grand Commander and relocated its offices from Marília to the state's capital, São Paulo.

In 1971 the company was losing money and in order to re-organize the air-taxi company, Ometto called Rolim Amaro, a former pilot of TAM, who had left the company to form his own air-taxi company. Amaro proposed to liquidate his company and purchase a portion of TAM. While this did not constitute 50% of TAM's capital, he proposed to Ometto that if he was able to make TAM profitable within one year, he would be given the remaining portion of the 50%. In case he failed, he would receive nothing. In April, 1972, the contract between Amaro and Ometto was signed, giving Amaro operational control over the company.

At the end of 1972 Amaro sold the entire fleet of TAM - Marília and bought 10 Cessna 402 aircraft directly from the manufacturer. Within one year, Amaro fulfilled his promise and was given 50% of the capital of TAM - Marília.

In 1974, TAM added two Learjets to its fleet. In exchange for one of these jets, 33% of the company's stock was given to the jet's owner, Tião Maia. The three-way split between Maia, Ometto and Amaro would remain until 1975, when Maia sold his share to Ometto. This deteriorated the atmosphere between Amaro and Ometto. In 1976, after 9 months of negotiations, Amaro bought Ometto's 50% of the shares for $2 million, with a promise to pay for it over a period of time.

Despite selling one of the jets and other assets, he was still unable to make the payments. For a period of time, Amaro went as far as cancelling insurance for his planes, in an attempt to reduce costs. The morning after insurance was reinstated, on September 24, 1977, one of TAM's Learjets crashed on approach to Santos Dumont Airport. Despite no injuries, the aircraft was a total loss. However, with the cash from the Lear's insurance and the proceeds of the sale of a farm, Amaro concluded his purchase of TAM - Marília.

TAM Aviação Executiva claims to be the leader in the sale of executive jets in Brazil and vice-leader in private air services. The company has been the exclusive representative in Brazil of Cessna airplanes since 1982 and of helicopter manufacturer Bell Helicopter since 2004.

Today, TAM Aviação Executiva is the executive aircraft service arm of TAM Group. TAM Executiva however is not a subsidiary of TAM Airlines, being entirely owned by family Amaro. For this reason, TAM Executiva is not part of the agreement between TAM Airlines and LAN Airlines to form the LATAM Airlines Group.

== See also ==
- LATAM Brasil
- List of airlines of Brazil
