= Directorate National of Civil Aeronautics (Paraguay) =

The Directorate General of Civil Aeronautics (Spanish: Dirección Nacional de Aeronáutica Civil, DINAC) is the civil aviation authority of Paraguay. Its headquarters is in the World Trade Center Asuncion in the capital city, Asunción. The Departamento de Investigacion de Accidentes de Aviacion (DIAA) of DINAC investigates aviation accidents. The agency is presided over by a general director, and organised into four main areas:

- Directorate of Aeronautics (Dirección de Aeronaútica)
- Directorate of Airports (Dirección de Aeropuertos)
- Directorate of Meteorology and Hydrology (Dirección de Meteorología e Hidrología)
- National Institute of Civil Aeronautics (Instituto Nacional de Aeronáutica Civil)

== See also ==
- List of airports in Paraguay
