= Silvio Pettirossi International Airport =

Silvio Pettirossi International Airport Aeropuerto Internacional Silvio Pettirossi
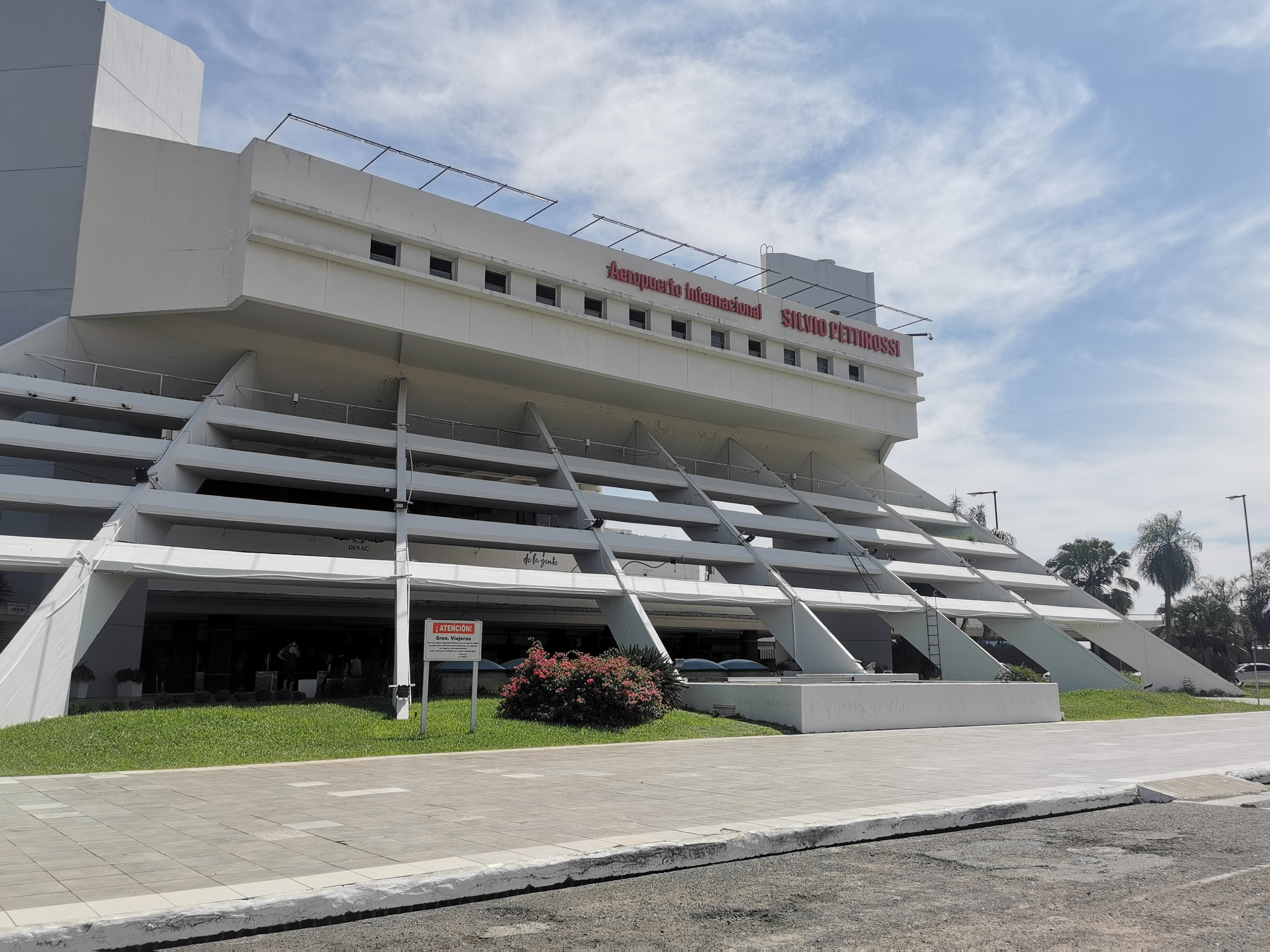
- IATA: ASU; ICAO: SGAS

Summary
- Airport type: Public/military
- Serves: Asunción
- Location: Luque, Paraguay
- Opened: 11 June 1938
- Hub for: LATAM Paraguay; Paranair
- Time zone: Time in Paraguay (UTC−03:00)
- Elevation AMSL: 89 m (292 ft)
- Coordinates: 25°14′23″S 057°31′09″W

Map
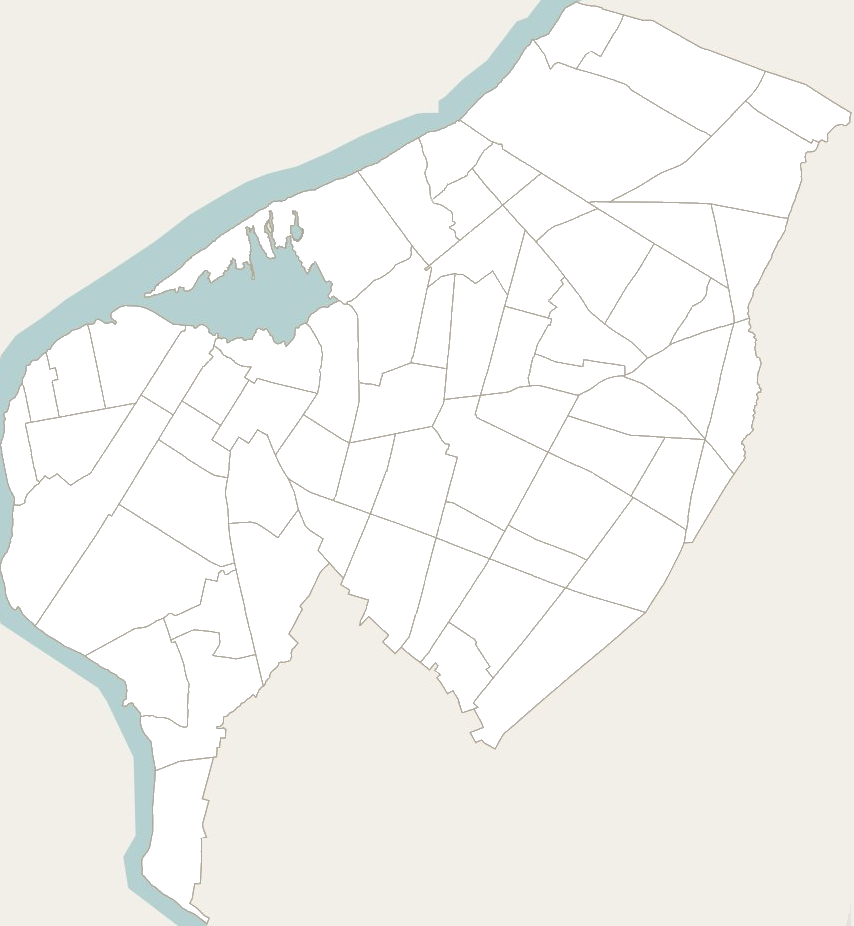
- Location of airport in Paraguay ASU (Paraguay)

Runways
Direction	Length		Surface
Direction	m	ft	Surface
02/20	3,353	11,001	Asphalt

Statistics (2025)
- Passengers: 1,323,613 ▲13%
- Aircraft operations: 52,477 ▲10%
- Metric tonnes of cargo: 25,042 ▲39%
- Statistics: DINAC

Silvio Pettirossi International Airport (IATA: ASU, ICAO: SGAS) is an international airport in Luque, Paraguay, which serves Paraguay's capital city, Asunción, and indirectly serves the nearby city of Clorinda, Formosa, in Argentina. The airport is named after Paraguayan aviator Silvio Pettirossi (1887–1916). Between 1980 and 1989, it was known as President Stroessner International Airport, after the former head of state, Alfredo Stroessner.

It is the main international hub for LATAM Paraguay and Paranair.

Some of its facilities are shared with the Ñu-Guazú Air Force Base of the Paraguayan Air Force.

== History ==
The airport was inaugurated on 11 June 1938. The airport's runway was constructed in the 1960s, and was resurfaced in 1985.

Spanish airline Iberia provided direct flights to Asunción from Madrid from around 1968 until the mid-1990s. Lufthansa flew once a week from Frankfurt to Asunción from 1971 to 1980, with DC-10 service starting in 1974. For both airlines, the flights included multiple stops in destinations throughout South America. Also, between the early 1990s and 1996, Lineas Aereas Paraguayas flew nonstop to Frankfurt with its DC-10.

=== 2000s ===
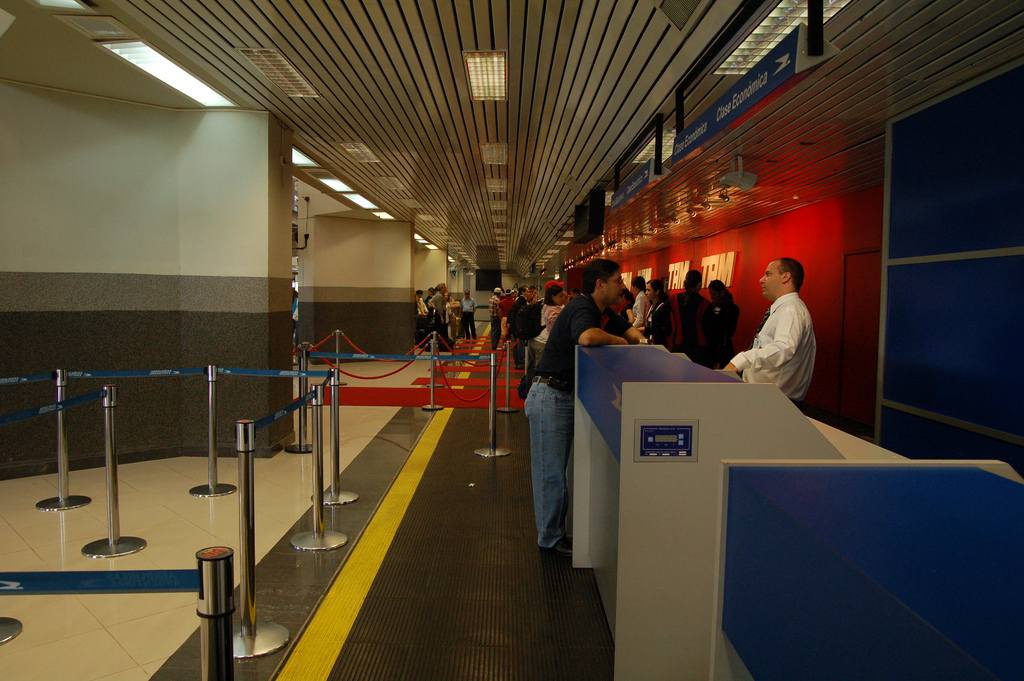
The check-in at the airport in 2008

In November 2004, the director of Direccion Nacional de Aeronautica Civil (DINAC), Eustaquio Ocáriz, told ABC Color that the airport's runway, which had repair work started in 2001, but halted due to lack of funds, would be completed by the early months of 2005.

On 31 July 2007, at 05:10am, a group of five men stole US$1,000,000 from a money exchange on the bottom floor of the airport. One of the robbers, Juan Pablo Ortigoza, was detained, along with others. Another robber was captured in Encarnación. It was later discovered that the robbery was planned in Asunción's Tacumbú prison. One of the arrested stated they received US$60,000 for the robbery. The money was going to be sent on a flight to Uruguay.

In May 2008, a report concluded that Paraguay's aeronautic systems were in a critical state and needed to be replaced. In November 2009, new instrument landing systems began operating. The equipment was acquired at a cost of €967,400. The previous system that was replaced was installed in 1980. The implementation of the system made Paraguay up to date with the requirements of international security as a member of the OACI.

=== 2010s ===
In January 2013, various improvements were made to the terminal. By 2015, some airlines had ceased operations at the airport, including American Airlines. On 17 December 2015, Air Europa began service between Pettirossi and Madrid, Spain, creating the first direct connection between Paraguay and Europe in 21 years.

In 2017, airport infrastructure specialist Carlos Achucarro estimated that the airport would require expansion before 2024. In January 2018, DINAC reported that the airport has seen a 15 percent rise in travellers from 2013 to 2017. The airport also saw an increase in flights, from 20 daily flights to about 60 flights by 2018.

=== 2020s ===
Pettirossi Airport ceased operating commercial flights for 7 months due to the COVID-19 pandemic. In October 2020, DINAC announced a ceremony for the resumption of flights.

In November 2020, five packages containing drugs were found by agents of the National Secretary of Antidrugs; one of the packages was destined for Sri Lanka and two each for Australia and Hong Kong. In February 2021, plans for a second terminal were unveiled, to be started in 2022. In October 2021, a new route, operated by Paranair, was announced between Pettirossi and Santa Cruz de la Sierra, Bolivia.

== Terminals ==
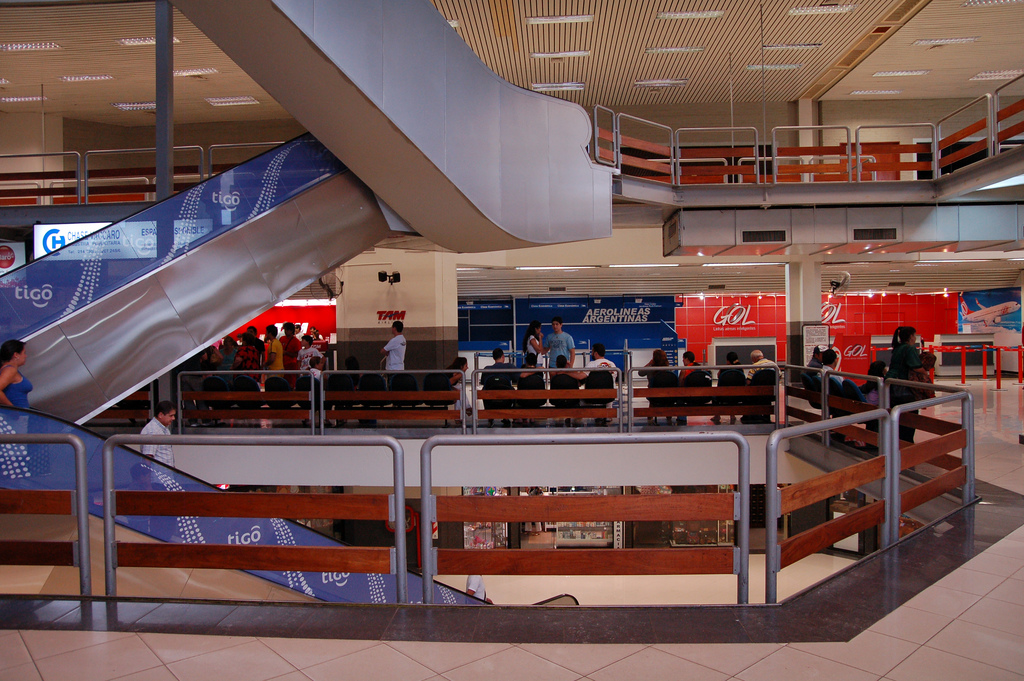
The interior of the airport in 2009

The original passenger terminal, located near threshold 02, is now instead used by Grupo Aerotáctico (GAT) of the Paraguayan Air Force. The current terminal began service on 20 March 1980.

The terminal building is split into two international concourses: the south concourse having gates 1 to 4, and the north concourse having gates 5 and 6. On 26 May 2023, renovation works of the north concourse were completed, greatly expanding the arrivals hall.

== Airlines and destinations ==
=== Passenger ===
Airlines	Destinations
Aerolíneas Argentinas	Buenos Aires–Aeroparque
Air Europa	Madrid
Avianca	Bogotá
Boliviana de Aviación	Santa Cruz de la Sierra–Viru Viru
Copa Airlines	Panama City–Tocumen
Gol Linhas Aéreas	Rio de Janeiro–Galeão (ends 30 January 2027), São Paulo–Guarulhos; Seasonal: Florianópolis
JetSmart Argentina	Buenos Aires–Aeroparque; Seasonal: Rio de Janeiro–Galeão
LATAM Paraguay	Lima, Montevideo (begins 28 December 2026), Santiago de Chile, São Paulo–Guarulhos
Paranair	Buenos Aires–Aeroparque, Montevideo, Salta, San Salvador de Jujuy, Santa Cruz de la Sierra–Viru Viru; Seasonal: Florianópolis, Punta del Este, Rio de Janeiro–Galeão

=== Cargo ===
Airlines	Destinations
Avianca Cargo	Miami, Montevideo
LATAM Cargo Brasil	Medellín–JMC, Miami

== Statistics ==
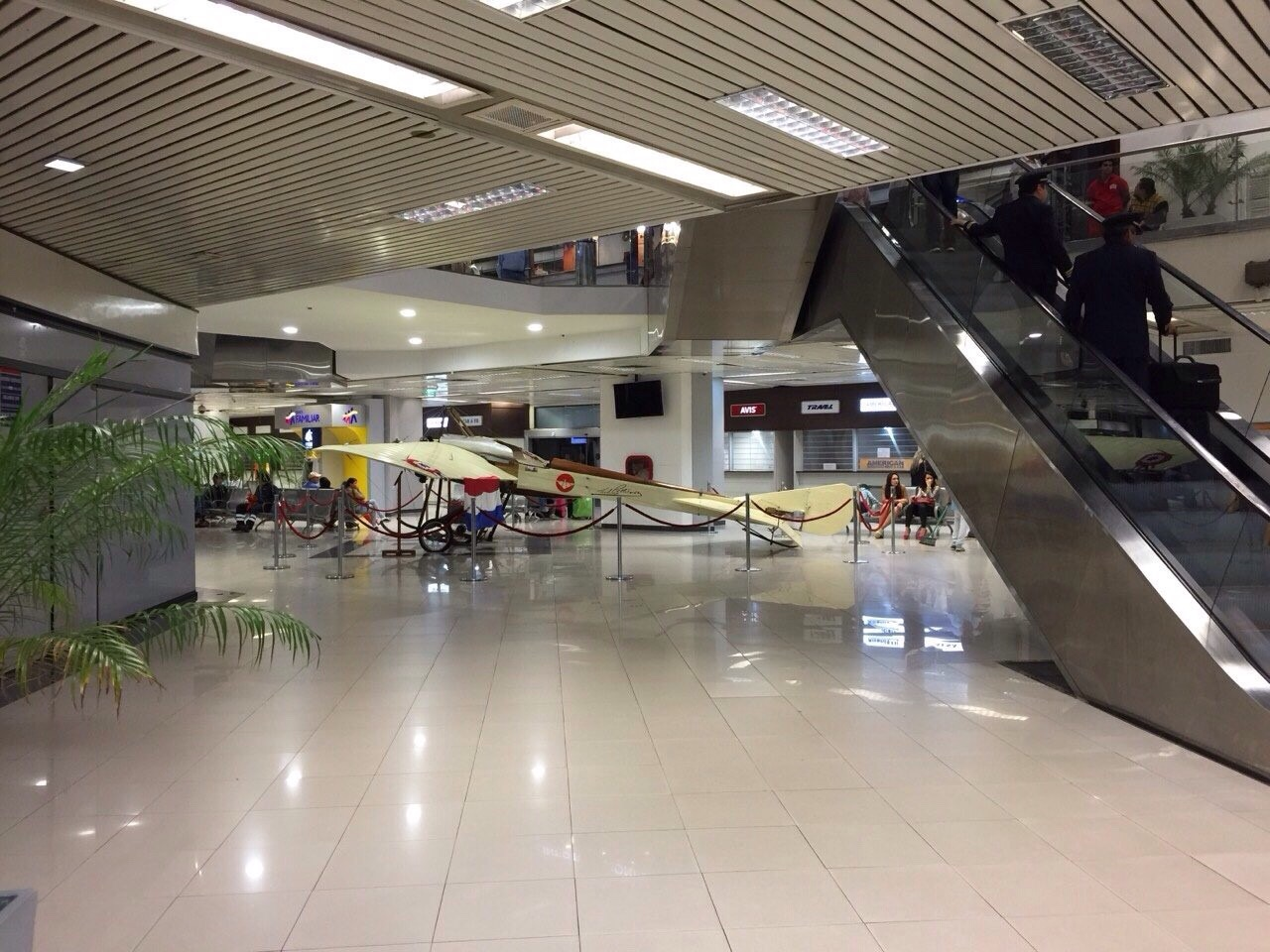
vintage aircraft on display in the main concourse

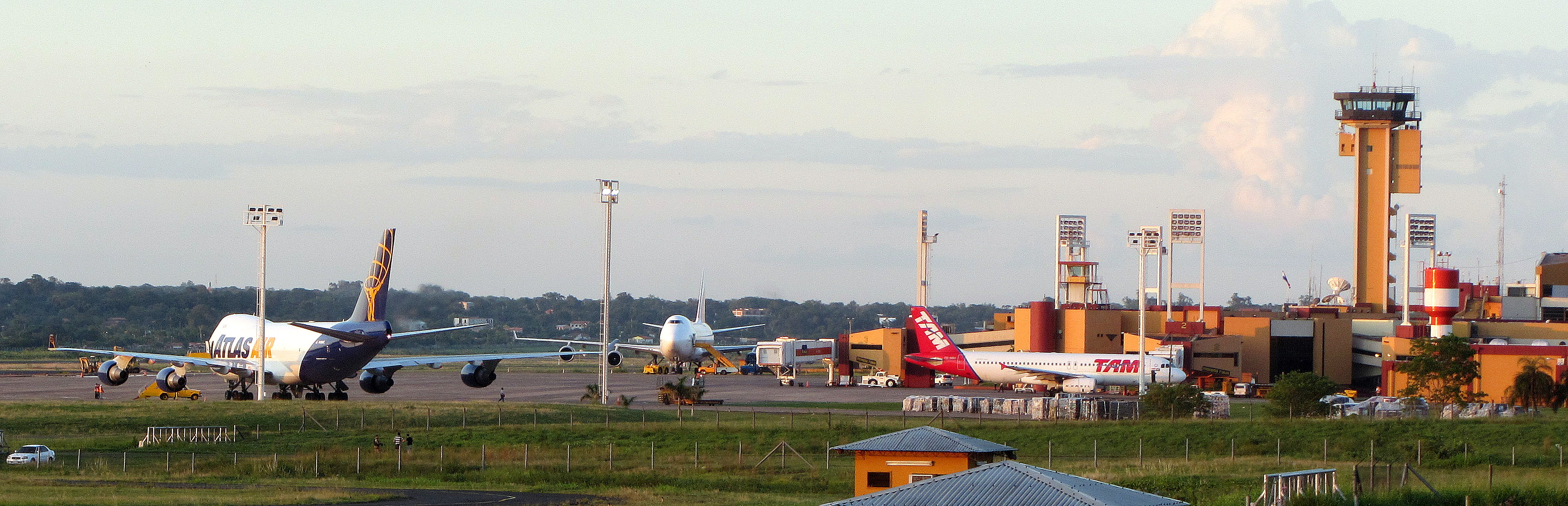

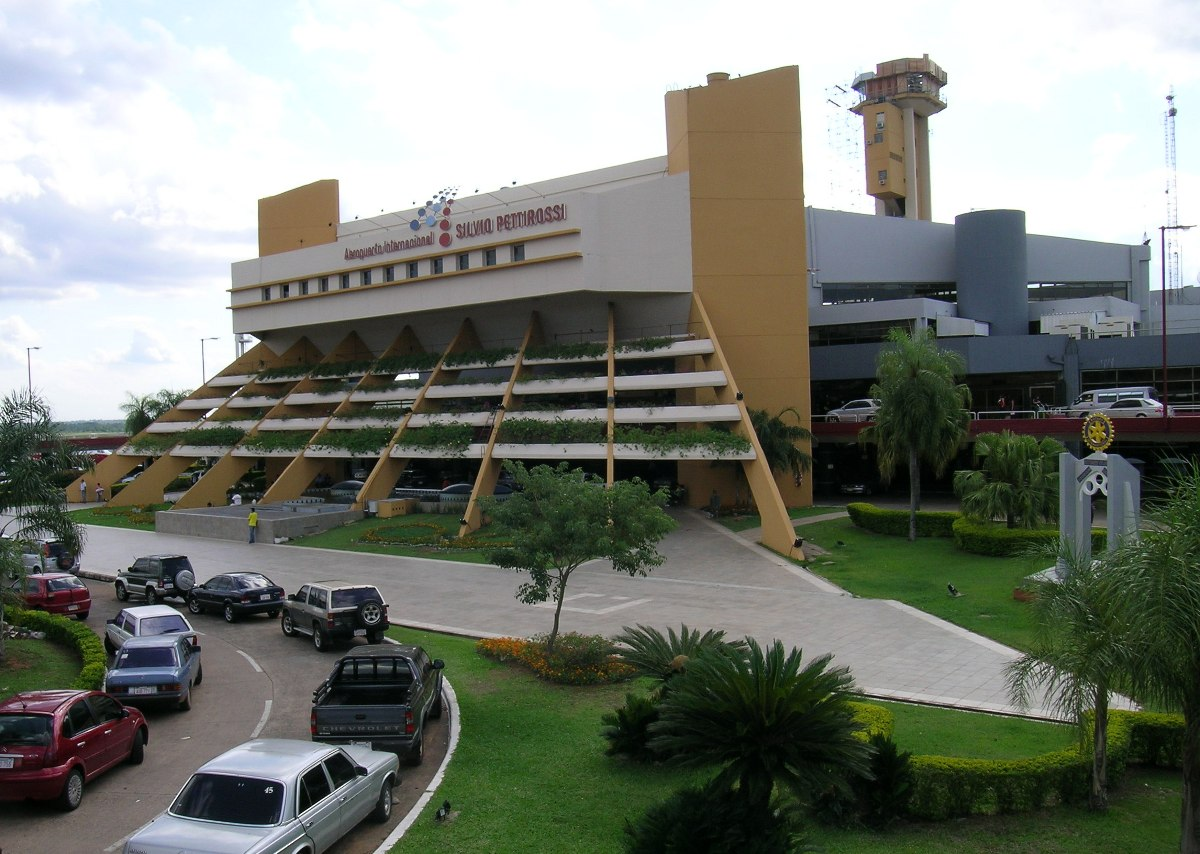

Following is the number of passenger, aircraft and cargo movements at the airport, according to the Dirección Nacional de Aeronáutica Civil (DINAC) reports:

Year	Passenger	Aircraft	Cargo (t)
2025	1,323,613 ▲13%	52,477 ▲10%	25,042 ▲39%
2024	1,167,503 ▲14%	47,546 ▼2%	18,029 ▲20%
2023	1,027,766 ▲17%	48,460 ▲1%	12,901 ▼10%
2022	876,625 ▲102%	48,108 ▲8%	14,308 ▼7%
2021	433,732 ▲39%	44,389 ▲25%	15,313 ▲31%
2020	311,813 ▼75%	35,405 ▼34%	11,704 ▼9%
2019	1,239,403 ▲2%	53,353	12,811 ▼4%
2018	1,211,576 ▲3%	53,443 ▲6%	13,398 ▼3%
2017	1,180,111 ▲14%	50,485 ▲5%	13,788 ▼2%
2016	1,033,168 ▲13%	48,025	14,110 ▲16%
2015	910,554 ▼1%	47,942 ▲4%	12,199 ▲11%
2014	915,425 ▲10%	46,028 ▲15%	10,954 ▲16%
2013	835,323 ▼4%	39,974 ▼8%	9,444
2012	868,534 ▲6%	43,336 ▲5%	9,491 ▲6%
2011	823,207 ▲12%	41,462 ▲15%	8,986 ▲34%
2010	733,810 ▲23%	36,030 ▲25%	6,729 ▲22%
2009	595,145 ▼6%	28,933 ▼3%	5,434 ▼23%
2008	631,338	29,683	7,054

== Accidents and incidents ==
- 16 June 1955: a Panair do Brasil–owned Lockheed L-149 Constellation, with registration PP-PDJ, was operating flight 263 from São Paulo-Congonhas to Asunción. It hit a 12m tree while on its final approach to land at Asunción. Part of the wing broke off, the aircraft crashed and caught fire. Of the 24 passengers and crew aboard, 16 died.
- 27 August 1959: an Aerolíneas Argentinas–owned de Havilland DH-106 Comet 4, with registration LV-AHP, was operating a flight from Buenos Aires to Asunción. While on approach to Asunción, bad weather caused a forced landing 9 km from Silvio Pettirossi Airport. A crew member and a passenger died.
- 29 August 1980: a Transporte Aéreo Militar–owned Douglas C-47B, with registration FAP2016, crashed on approach to Asunción. The aircraft was on a flight to Ayolas when an engine failed shortly after take-off and the decision was made to land back at Asunción. One person died.
- 4 February 1996: a cargo LAC Colombia–owned Douglas DC-8-55F, with registration HK-3979X, was on an empty positioning flight around Asunción prior to a flight from Asunción to Campinas. At VR power was reduced on no. 1 engine and, after rotation, also on the no. 2 engine. With the gear still down and flaps at 15° the aircraft lost control and crashed on a playing field 2 km past the runway. The crew possibly used the positioning flight as an opportunity for crew training. All four occupants of the aircraft and 20 persons on the ground died.

== Access ==
The airport, located within the municipality of Luque, is located 10 km (6 mi) from downtown Asunción. It may be reached via the Aviadores del Chaco Avenue, which runs adjacent to nearby Ñu Guasú Park. Bus line 30-A links Asunción's downtown with the airport terminal.

== See also ==
- List of airports in Paraguay
- Transport in Paraguay
- List of airports by ICAO code: S#SG - Paraguay
