= Cristian Polo =

Ecuadorian lawyer and LGBTQ activist

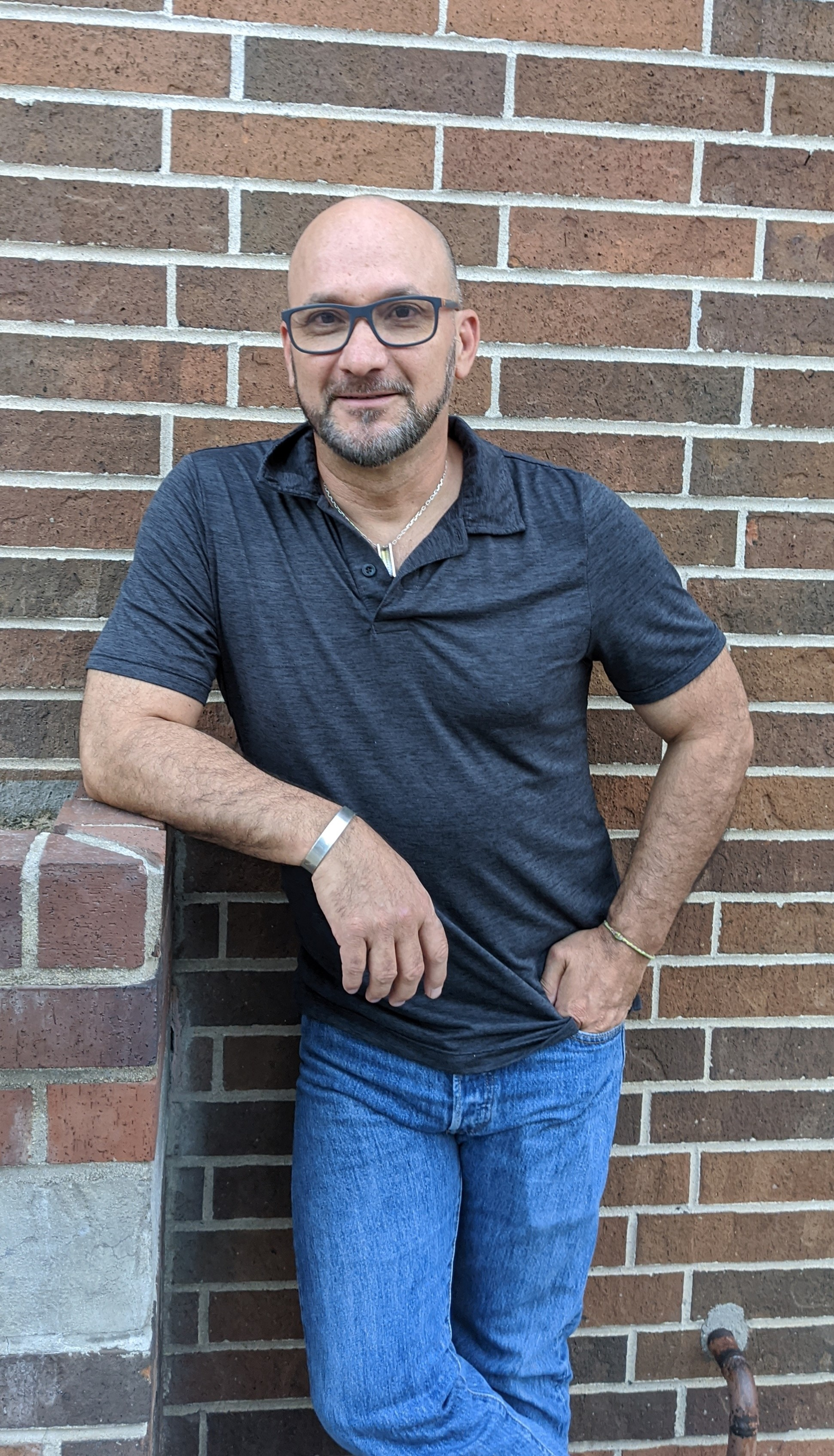
- Polo in 2022
- Born: October 24, 1969 (age 57); Pasaje, Ecuador
- Education: University of Cuenca
- Occupations: Lawyer; teacher; LGBTQ activist

Cristian André Polo Loayza (Pasaje, b. October 24, 1969) is an Ecuadorian lawyer, teacher and activist for LGBTQ rights. He was one of the main figures in the process to achieve the decriminalization of homosexuality in Ecuador in 1997, being the lawyer who wrote the lawsuit (Case No. 111-97-TC) with which the law that criminalized LGBTQ people was declared unconstitutional.

== Biography ==
He was born on October 24, 1969, in Pasaje, El Oro Province. He completed his higher education at the University of Cuenca, where in 1992 he obtained a bachelor's degree in political and social sciences. In 1994 he obtained a doctorate in jurisprudence at the same university.

After completing his studies he moved to the city of Quito, but was fired from the bank where he worked when his superior found out that he was homosexual. Around that time he began to attend the Fedaeps foundation, which included several LGBTQ activists in the city, such as Orlando Montoya and Irene León. Months later, Polo joined Fedaeps as head of the Homophobia Alert program, which offered legal help in cases of discrimination against LGBTQ people.

=== Decriminalization of homosexuality ===
As part of Fedaeps, Polo began working on the foundation's strategy to achieve the decriminalization of homosexuality in Ecuador, which at that time was a crime in Ecuador with a sentence of up to eight years in prison. This process was accelerated by the Bar Abanicos police raid, a police raid on an LGBTQ bar in Cuenca that occurred in June 1997 in which the detained people suffered a series of abuses. The case reached Fedaeps' ears through Polo's contacts, since some of his university friends were among the detainees. Fedaeps then created the group Triángulo Andino to publicly announce the campaign for the decriminalization of homosexuality, with Polo as the legal spokesman of the group.

The group discussed several options to achieve legal change in conjunction with two other LGBTQ organizations: the Coccinelle Association and the Tolerance Group. Finally, it was decided to file a lawsuit in the Constitutional Tribunal, which would be sponsored by the jurist Ernesto López, former president of the organization. After meeting with him, it was agreed that the lawsuit would be written by Polo under the supervision of López, who would later sign it. The first two versions of the text of the lawsuit were rejected by López, who gave several indications to improve them. López accepted the third version of it, which was presented to the Court and had the signatures, in addition to that of Polo and López, of Jimmy Coronado Tello, Silvia Haro Proaño, José Urriola and Gonzalo Abarca.

During the following two months, members of Tolerance and the Andean Triangle, including Polo, went to the Constitutional Tribunal to obtain hearings with its members and explain the need for decriminalization. In total, they met with seven of the nine members.

On November 25, 1997, the Constitutional Tribunal gave its unanimous opinion in the case, which received the name Case No. 111-97-TC and agreed with the plaintiffs, so it declared the first paragraph of article 516 of the Criminal Code unconstitutional and thus decriminalized homosexuality in Ecuador.

=== Later activism ===
Polo was also the lawyer who drafted the statutes for the legalization of the Coccinelle Association, which became the first openly LGBTQ organization to obtain legal recognition in the history of Ecuador.

In December 1997, the Ecuadorian Constituent Assembly of 1997 and 1998 was installed in order to draft a new constitution for the country. Thanks to the political contacts of Irene León, Polo and Orlando Montoya attended as representatives of the Andean Triangle conversations with assembly members to propose changes in favor of LGBTQ populations. With the support of Assemblywoman Nina Pacari, this allowed sexual orientation to be included among the categories protected against discrimination in article 23 of the constitution.

After the achievement achieved in the 1998 Constitution, Polo decided to leave the country due to the constant homophobic harassment and death threats that he began to suffer from the time of the campaign for decriminalization and that did not stop after reaching the opinion of the Constitutional Tribunal. Polo finally moved to the United States, where he started working as a Spanish teacher.

== Sources ==
- Ramos Ballesteros, Paulino (2019). Memorias Mecas. Archivo, imágenes y cuerpo en el vigésimo aniversario de la despenalización de la homosexualidad en Ecuador (MA in Visual Anthropology thesis) (in Spanish). Quito, Ecuador: Latin American Faculty of Social Sciences. hdl:10469/16003.
- Lobato, Fredy, ed. (2023). Cuéntame una historia. Despenalización de la homosexualidad en Ecuador (in Spanish). Fundación Ecuatoriana Equidad. ISBN 978-9942-7154-0-1.
