= Estrella Estévez =

Ecuadorian transgender activist (born 1972)

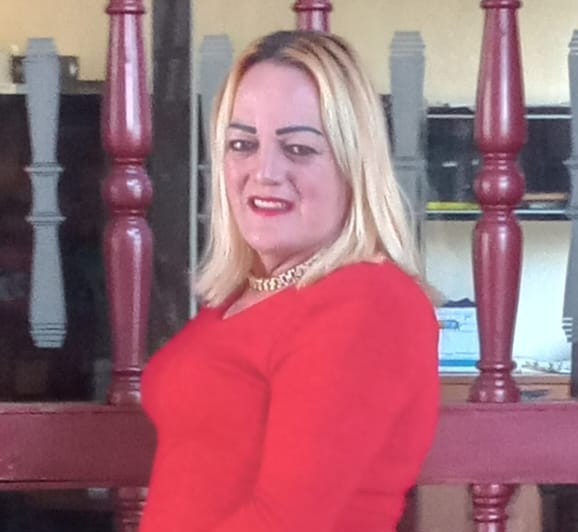
- Estévez in 2022
- Born: June 7, 1972 (age 53); Yaruquí, Quito Canton, Ecuador
- Occupation: Activist
- Known for: LGBT activism, having her gender marker changed

Dayris Estrella Estévez Carrera (born June 7, 1972) is an Ecuadorian transgender activist. She was one of the original founders of the Coccinelle Association, the first Ecuadorian trans organization. She was also a key player in the decriminalization of homosexuality in Ecuador. Additionally, in 2009, Estévez was able to change the sex on her government ID to female after a long legal battle. She was the first person in the country to do so, marking a milestone for LGBT rights in Ecuador.

== Biography ==
Estrella Estévez was born in 1972 in Yaruquí, a rural parish of Quito. She grew up in a poor family as the eldest of nine children. At age five, she began to see herself as a girl. She was bullied at school, especially once she started wearing feminine clothing. Her family accepted her as transgender and tried to protect her from bullying in her youth.

Estévez had trouble getting her bachelor's degree in social sciences because of her gender identity. In order to earn her degree, she had to escalate to Raúl Vallejo, Ecuador's Minister of Education at the time.

=== Coccinelle Association ===
During the 1990s, Estrella Estévez experienced violence and discrimination from police because of her gender identity. On one occasion in 1995, she says she was buying a newspaper when two police officers insulted her, trapped her in a net, and shoved her in the trunk of their car. She claims they arrested her for wearing a skirt and high heels in public. At the time, arbitrary detentions of LGBT people were common, especially transgender female sex workers and hairdressers. In 1997, Estévez began inviting other trans women, including Purita Pelayo, to recount their stories of abuse and victimization to the Permanent Assembly for Human Rights (ADPH). Estévez was already familiar with the ADPH because Alex Ponce, an ADPH representative, had helped her file an unsuccessful lawsuit against the paper La Hora three years prior. At the first meeting with Ponce, those present decided to organize to protest police violence. They founded the Coccinelle Association, Ecuador's first transgender organization. Estévez was one of the original founders, along with Purita Pelayo and Gonzalo Abarca.

After the Bar Abanicos police raid in June 1997, Coccinelle and other Ecuadorian LGBT organizations formed a united front to purse the decriminalization of homosexuality. At the time, homosexual activity was punishable by four to eight years in prison under the first clause of Article 516 of the Penal Code. After discussing possible strategies to achieve decriminalization, the organizations decided to argue that Article 516 was unconstitutional. To bring a challenge before the Constitutional Court of Ecuador, they needed to get signatures on a petition. The Coccinelle Association spent days collecting signatures at sites such as the Plaza de la Independencia and Central University of Ecuador in Quito. Estévez and other transgender women set up tables and chairs at these locations to explain their cause and gain signatures from passerby. The women collected 1,800 signatures, far surpassing what the law required. In November of 1997, the Constitutional Court of Ecuador declared the first clause of article 516 of the penal code unconstitutional, decriminalizing homosexuality in Ecuador.

=== Gender marker change ===
In 2001, Estrella Estévez began trying to change her legal name and gender marker on official documentation. After the Civil Registry refused to change her documentation, she decided to file a complaint with the Ombudsman's Office of Ecuador in 2007. On January 24, 2008, the office decided in her favor, requiring the Civil Registry to recognize her gender identity. The Civil Registry complied in part: that March, they changed her legal name to Estrella Estévez, but refused to update her sex. The Ombudsman's Office issued a ministerial accord asking the Civil Registry to reconsider its decision. The director of the Civil Registry refused, maintaining that the change would violate articles 84 and 89 of the Civil Registry Law.

Following the Civil Registry's response, Estévez filed a writ of amparo with the Ninth Civil Court of Pichincha, but the judge did not grant it. She then decided to appeal the decision before the Provincial Court of Justice of Pichincha. On September 25, 2009, Judge Ramiro García ruled in favor of Estévez, ordering the Civil Registry to immediately update her gender marker to female. García based his decision on Article 66 of the Constitution, which guarantees both the right to personal identity and equal rights regardless of gender identity.

On October 22, 2009, the Civil Registry complied with the judicial order, and Estévez received her new government ID displaying her sex as female. The event was reported by national media in Ecuador and in Peru. Afterward, the Ombudsman's Office petitioned the Constitutional Court of Ecuador to accept García's ruling as a binding precedent, but the Court did not respond.

She was nominated for the Patricio Brabomalo Award, which is granted to Ecuadorians who advance LGBT rights in the country.

== Bibliography ==
- Benítez Argüello, Jeniffer (2014). La reasignación de sexo y su reconocimiento registral: análisis del desarrollo conceptual de sexo, género, e identidad [Sex reassignment and its official recognition: analysis of the conceptual development of sex, gender, and identity] (PDF) (Thesis) (in Spanish). Quito: Pontifical Catholic University of Ecuador. Archived from the original (PDF) on June 29, 2021.
- Cardona Acuña, Luz Angela (2019). Sotavento y Barlovento: el impacto de las interacciones societales y socio-estatales sobre los cambios legales relativos a la diversidad sexual en Perú y Ecuador (1980-2018) [Leeward and windward: the impact of societal and socio-state interactions on legal changes related to sexual diversity in Peru and Ecuador (1980-2018)] (PDF) (Thesis) (in Spanish). Mexico City: Latin American Faculty of Social Sciences. Archived from the original (PDF) on August 20, 2021.
- Garrido Álvarez, Rafael José (2015). Acceso a la justicia de las personas LGBT en la ciudad de Quito, 2008-2013 [LGBT people's access to justice in Quito, 2008-2013] (PDF) (Thesis). Quito: Simon Bolivar Andean University. Archived from the original on June 28, 2021.
- Garrido Álvarez, Rafael José (2017). La despenalización de la homosexualidad en Ecuador: el legado de la acción colectiva LGBTI [The decriminalization of homosexuality in Ecuador: the legacy of collective LGBTI action] (PDF) (Thesis) (in Spanish). Quito: Simon Bolivar Andean University. Archived from the original (PDF) on February 14, 2021.
- Ramos Ballesteros, Paulino (2019). Archivo, imágenes y cuerpo en el vigésimo aniversario de la despenalización de la homosexualidad en Ecuador [Archive, images, and body on the twentieth anniversary of the decriminalization of homosexuality in Ecuador] (PDF) (Thesis). Quito: Latin American Faculty of Social Sciences. Archived (PDF) from the original on April 27, 2021.
- Sánchez Montenegro, Rebeca Daniela (2018). Encarnando interseccionalidades: experiencias de mujeres trans en Quito [Embodying intersectionalities: experiences of trans women in Quito] (PDF) (Thesis) (in Spanish). Quito: Central University of Ecuador. Archived (PDF) from the original on June 29, 2021.
