= Coccinelle Association =

LGBTQ+ group in Ecuador

Coccinelle Association of Gay, Travesti, and Transgender Persons
- Asociación de Gays, Travestis y Transgéneros Coccinelle
- Named after: Coccinelle
- Successor: Ecuadorian Foundation for Sexual Minorities (FEMIS)
- Formation: July 20, 1997
- Founder: Purita Pelayo; Estrella Estévez; Gonzalo Abarca
- Founded at: Ecuador
- Dissolved: 2000
- Fields: LGBT rights
- Key people: Purita Pelayo; Estrella Estévez; María Jacinta Almeida

The Coccinelle Association of Gay, Travesti, and Transgender Persons was an Ecuadorian LGBTQ group created on 20 July 1997. It was the first organization of transgender, lesbian, gay, intersex, and travesti persons in the history of Ecuador. They played a prominent role during the process to achieve the decriminalization of homosexuality in the country, while being persecuted and repressed by the police, especially during the administration of President León Febres Cordero (1984–1988) and up until that of President Jamil Mahuad (1998–2000). The campaign for decriminalization reached its goal on 25 November 1997.

The group was disbanded in 2000 due to conflict among its members. It later became the Ecuadorian Foundation for Sexual Minorities (FEMIS), which was in operation until 2006.

== Background ==
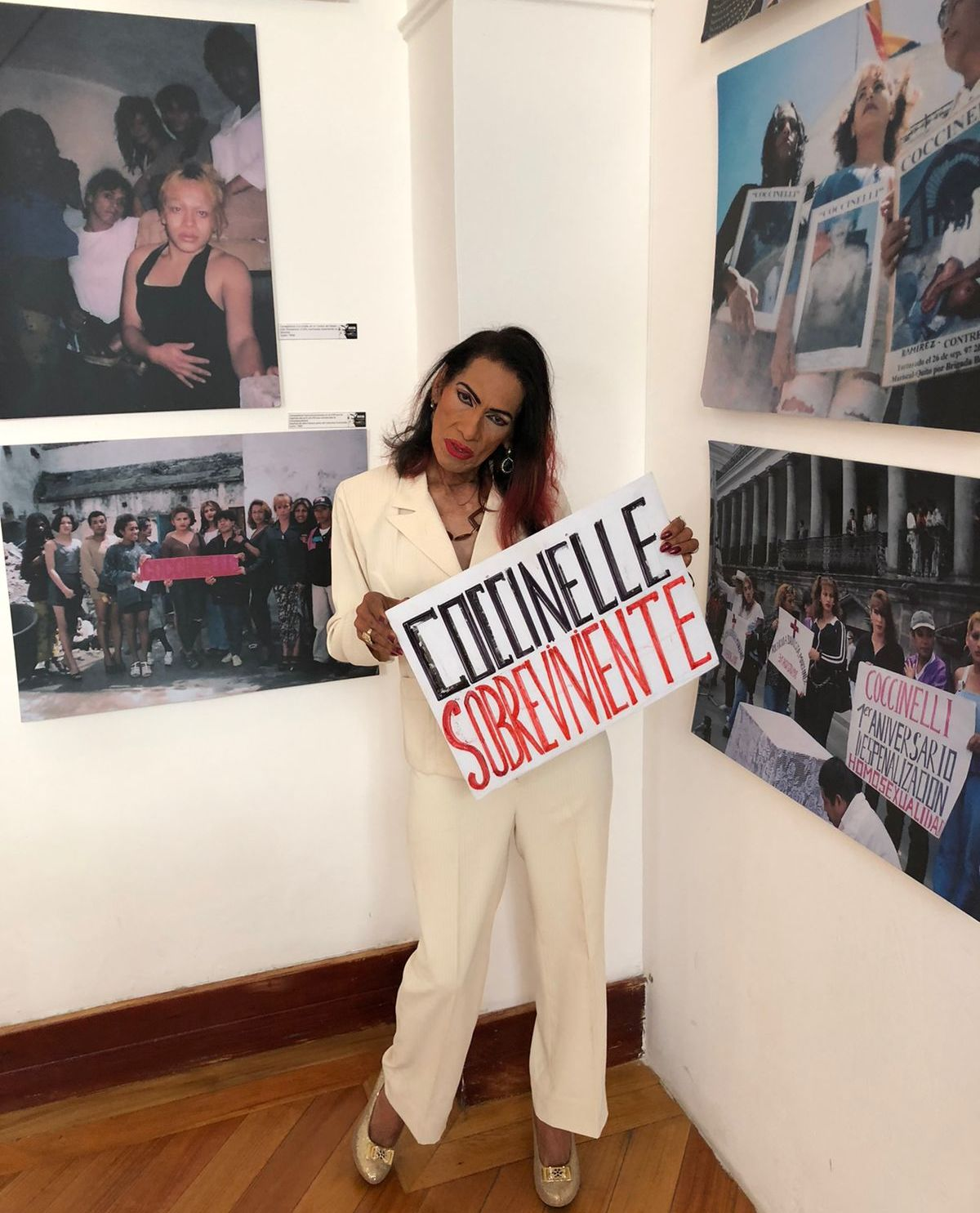
Purita Pelayo, one of the founders

During the 1990s, Ecuador was going through a period of mobilizations and demands by human rights groups—including those advocating for the rights of young people, women, and indigenous persons—that rejected the violations perpetrated during the administration of former President León Febres Cordero. LGBT populations had been among the most adversely affected by police abuse, as officers used to arrest, torture and, in some cases, kill LGBT people with impunity under the cover of the criminalization of homosexuality that was in force at the time.

In 1997, the Permanent Assembly for Human Rights (APDH) was one of the organizations that helped transgender people who were being repressed by the State. Estrella Estévez, a trans woman who had suffered abuse by the police, invited activist Purita Pelayo and other transgender women to tell the APDH about their experiences and the abuse they were being subjected to. After a first meeting between them and APDH representative Alexis Ponce, they decided to join forces to protest against the abuse.

Coccinelle's founders were Estrella Estévez, Gonzalo Abarca, and Purita Pelayo, the latter of whom became the association's president. The name Coccinelle was chosen as an homage to French actress, singer, and transgender activist Jacqueline Charlotte Dufresnoy, who had visited Ecuador in the 1970s and performed at the Nueve de Octubre theater in Guayaquil. At the time of its foundation, the organization had 22 members. A few weeks later, the number had grown to 45 people.

=== Decriminalization of homosexuality ===
A violent police raid took place in Cuenca on 14 June 1997 at the Bar Abanicos, a gay bar. Many of those who were at the bar were arrested and taken to a detention center, where they were tortured and sexually assaulted by other inmates and the police officers themselves. The instances of abuse perpetrated during the raid were covered by the national press. This led various advocacy groups for LGBT rights to join forces as a united front, for the first time in the country's history, to fight for the decriminalization of homosexuality, which at the time was classified as a crime in article 516 of the Criminal Code. Coccinelle was one of the organizations that joined the front, which took on the name Triángulo Andino. (Note: English: Andean Triangle) Other organizations that joined in were FEDAEPS, (Note: Fundación Ecuatoriana de Ayuda, Educación y Prevención del SIDA, or Ecuadorian Foundation of Help, Education, and Prevention of AIDS) Fundación Amigos por la Vida (Famivida), (Note: English: Friends For Life Foundation) and the Tolerancia (Note: English: Tolerance) group.

The first discussions among the collectives were encouraged by Coccinelle and focused on determining the best method to achieve decriminalization. Finally, it was decided that the best strategy was to file a claim of unconstitutionality against article 516 with the Constitutional Court, for which they needed to collect 1,000 signatures expressing support.

The rally to collect signatures marked the first time in Ecuador's history that LGBT people had taken over streets and public spaces. Coccinelle gained prominence during the collection process and, on 27 August of the same year, made history when it organized a march of transgender women, gay men, and human rights defenders that took to the streets in Quito and ended at the Plaza de la Independencia, where they joined the groups that were demanding to know the whereabouts of missing persons. They managed to obtain 300 signatures in favor of decriminalization. This demonstration was the first one in the country's history in which the participants were sexually diverse persons. After the demonstration, Coccinnelle continued to lead the process of collecting signatures and its members began to gather every Wednesday at the Plaza de la Independencia to demand their rights and ask for support.

On 24 September 1997, representatives of the LGBT organizations that were participating in the campaign for decriminalization filed a claim with the Constitutional Court against Article 516 of the Criminal Code. Purita Pelayo and Gonzalo Abarca signed as Coccinelle's representatives. The Court issued its ruling on 25 November of the same year and declared as unconstitutional the first clause of Article 516, thus effectively decriminalizing homosexuality.

=== Subsequent years and dissolution ===
On 10 December 1998, Coccinelle joined advocacy groups for the rights of sex workers in leading the march to commemorate the 50th anniversary of the Universal Declaration of Human Rights, although some human rights activists raised their objections at first. This marked the first time a transgender women's group participated in a traditional human rights march.

The conflicts that led to Coccinnelle's dissolution began in 1998, when Dutch cooperation organization Hivos gave funds to the association to carry out sex education workshops, help members of the community in need, and rent an office, which was located in a house in San Blas Square (Quito). However, after Coccinelle received the international funds, this led to disagreements among its leaders over how to use the money, which ultimately led to the association being dissolved in 2000. Coccinelle then gave rise to the Ecuadorian Foundation for Sexual Minorities (FEMIS), which was dissolved in 2006.

Meanwhile, in July 2000, seven of the association's members, all of whom identified as travesti, were arrested by police in Guayaquil for "committing a crime against decency." Amnesty International expressed its concern about the arbitrary detention.

== Nueva Coccinelle ==
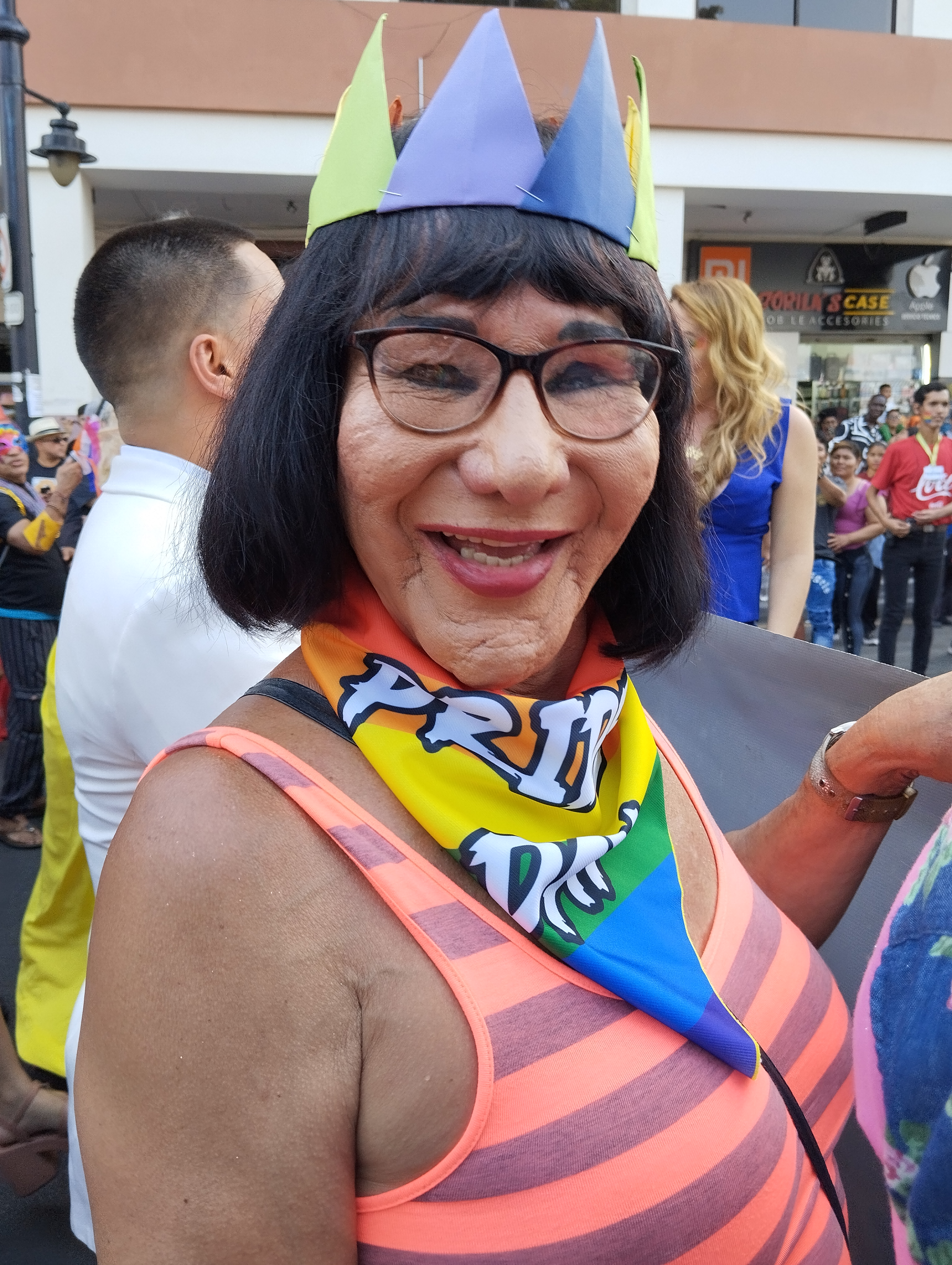
Nebraska Montenegro, president of Nueva Coccinelle, in 2024

In 2017, to commemorate the 20th anniversary of the decriminalization of homosexuality in the country, Purita Pelayo published the book Los fantasmas se cabrearon, where she told the tales of the abuse perpetrated against the LGBT+ population during the 1980s and 1990s, the creation of Coccinelle, and the process to decriminalize homosexuality. On the occasion of the book being published, several Coccinelle survivors met up again, and Pelayo began to contemplate the idea of filing a lawsuit against the State for the abuse perpetrated by the police against them and the LGBT+ populations in general during those years.

In 2019, twelve Coccinelle survivors, including Pelayo, María Jacinta Almeida, and Nebraska Montenegro, came together to create the Nueva Coccinnelle foundation, with Montenegro as the organization's president. Through the foundation, they filed a lawsuit against the Ecuadorian State for crimes against humanity on May 17 of that same year, within the context of the International Day Against Homophobia, Biphobia and Transphobia. The lawsuit was filed jointly with the Regional Advisory Foundation in Human Rights (INREDH) and was admitted by the Prosecutor's Office on 19 June 2019. As of March 2022, the legal proceedings had yet to make progress.

Additionally, Nueva Coccinelle launched a campaign to find more LGBT+ survivors of police repression in the late 20th century in order to recover their stories.

== See also ==
- Timeline of LGBT history in Ecuador
- Decriminalization of homosexuality in Ecuador
- LGBTQ rights in Ecuador
- Same-sex marriage in Ecuador
- Orlando Montoya
- Bar Abanicos police raid
- Case No. 111-97-TC

== Bibliography ==
- Cardona Acuña, Luz Angela (November 2019). Sotavento y Barlovento: el impacto de las interacciones societales y socio-estatales sobre los cambios legales relativos a la diversidad sexual en Perú y Ecuador (1980–2018) [Leeward and Windward: the impact of societal and socio-state interactions on legal changes concerning sexual diversity in Peru and Ecuador (1980-2018)] (PDF) (PhD in social sciences thesis) (in Spanish). Mexico City: Latin American Faculty of Social Sciences. Archived from the original (PDF) on 20 August 2021.
- Garrido Álvarez, Rafael José (2017). La despenalización de la homosexualidad en Ecuador: el legado de la acción colectiva LGBTI [Decriminalization of homosexuality in Ecuador: the legacy of the LGBTI collective action] (PDF) (Report) (in Spanish). Quito: Simón Bolívar Andean University. Archived from the original (PDF) on 14 February 2021.
- Lobato, Fredy, ed. (2023). Cuéntame una historia. Despenalización de la homosexualidad en Ecuador [Tell me a story. Decriminalization of homosexuality in Ecuador.] (in Spanish). Quito: Fundación Ecuatoriana Equidad. ISBN 978-9942-7154-0-1.
- Mancero Villarreal, Cristina (20 August 2007). La construcción del movimiento gay y sus manifestaciones sociales, culturales, y políticas en la ciudad de Quito [The construction of the gay movement and its social, cultural, and political manifestations in the city of Quito] (PDF) (Bachelor's degree in social anthropology thesis) (in Spanish). Quito: Latin American Faculty of Social Sciences. Archived from the original (PDF) on 10 July 2020.
- National Council for Gender Equality (CNIG) (2017). Una aproximación a la situación de los derechos humanos de las personas trans en Ecuador [An approach to the human rights situation of transgender people in Ecuador] (PDF) (Report) (in Spanish).
- Ramos Ballesteros, Paulino (November 2019). Archivo, imágenes y cuerpo en el vigésimo aniversario de la despenalización de la homosexualidad en Ecuador [Archive, images, and body on the 20th anniversary of the decriminalization of homosexuality in Ecuador] (PDF) (Master's degree in visual anthropology thesis) (in Spanish). San José, Costa Rica: Latin American Faculty of Social Sciences. Archived from the original (PDF) on 27 April 2021.
- Sánchez Montenegro, Rebeca Daniela (2018). Encarnando interseccionalidades: Experiencias de mujeres trans en Quito [Embodying intersectionalities: Experiences of trans women in Quito] (PDF) (Bachelor's in sociology thesis) (in Spanish). Quito: Central University of Ecuador. Archived from the original (PDF) on 29 June 2021.
- Sancho Ordoñez, Fernando I.; Platero, R. Lucas (15 December 2018). "Memorias posibles para el Movimiento Trans* en Ecuador" [Possible memories for the Ecuador trans* movement]. Ex Aequo (in Spanish) (3). Lisbon, Portugal: Portuguese Association of Women’s Studies: 49–65. doi:10.22355/exaequo.2018.38.04. hdl:2072/441276. ISSN 2184-0385.
- Valdez Gilbert, David Rafael (2019). Sistematización de la experiencia de conceptualización e implementación de la estrategia de RR.PP. del proyecto Zoom durante el 2019 [Systematization of the experience of conceptualizing and implementing the PR strategy for the Zoom project during 2019] (PDF) (Bachelor's degree in social communications thesis) (in Spanish). Guayaquil: Casa Grande University. Archived from the original (PDF) on 12 April 2021.
