= Orlando Montoya =

Colombian LGBT activist

Orlando Montoya Herrera
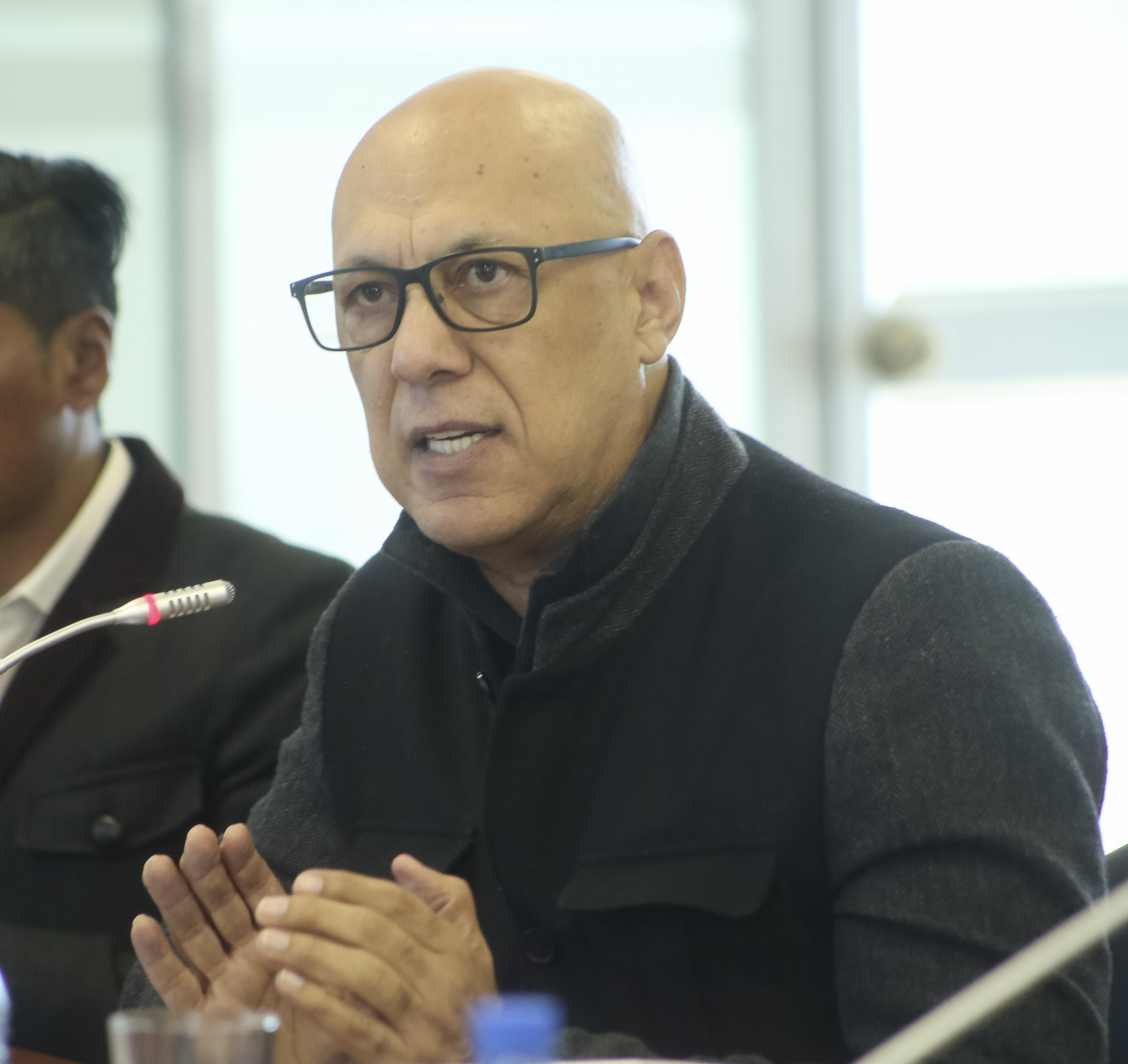
- Orlando Montoya at the Commission on the Right to Health, Quito, 5 June 2019
- Born: 28 August 1952; El Dovio, Colombia
- Died: 11 January 2021 (aged 68); Guayaquil, Ecuador
- Occupations: LGBT activist and hairdresser

Orlando Montoya Herrera (28 August 1952 – 11 January 2021) was a Colombian LGBT activist living in Ecuador. He was one of the most important figures in the early days of LGBT rights activism in Ecuador and in the campaign for the decriminalization of homosexuality in the country, which was achieved in 1997. He was also the founder of several Ecuadorian LGBT organizations, including FEDAEPS and the Equidad Foundation.

== Biography ==
He was born on 28 August 1952 in El Dovio, a town and municipality in the Department of Valle del Cauca, Colombia. He lived in Bogotá before moving to Ecuador. On 8 February 1978, he moved with his partner to Quito, where his brothers were studying and where he planned to stay temporarily. A year later, the relationship with his partner ended and he decided to stay in the city permanently.

During the 1980s, Montoya worked as a stylist and achieved great prestige among Quito's upper class. Among his clients were figures such as First Lady María Eugenia Cordovez. Because homosexuality was still a crime in those days, Montoya and several of his acquaintances who were also part of the LGBT community were arrested by the police on several occasions, particularly during the time of the escuadrones volantes. This marked the beginning of Montoya's activism, and he began to use the influence of his contacts, particularly the first lady, to be able to arrange the release of several LGBT persons. In addition, his contacts helped him obtain an interview slot on Channel 4 in 1986, where he denounced the hate crimes against the LGBT community and the impunity for these crimes. This made him the first LGBT person to appear on Ecuadorian television to denounce cases of homophobia.

He started to get interested in HIV-related issues in 1985, when he visited a close friend in Bogotá who was in a serious condition after being infected with the disease. The experience led him to start promoting education on the subject together with several friends. Thus, on 25 December 1986, he created with other people "Entre Amigos," one of the first LGBT groups in the country, with the aim of working on HIV prevention and complaints about police abuse against LGBT people. In 1988, the group was registered under the name SOGA (Sociedad Gay) and came into contact with the International Lesbian, Gay, Bisexual, Trans and Intersex Association (ILGA).

Among the complaints made by Montoya during this period was protesting against the requirement by authorities to demand stylists get tested for HIV, which was in turn a condition for receiving a health card. To this end, he met with the director of the National HIV/AIDS Program, an institution established in 1985. This meeting gave way for SOGA to start working together with the institution on issues related to the prevention of the disease.

Faced with the risk of the organization being penalized for having the word "gay" in its name, SOGA later became FEDAEPS (Ecuadorian Foundation of Help, Education, and Prevention of AIDS).

=== Decriminalization of homosexuality ===
His efforts to achieve the decriminalization of homosexuality began after he learned of the existence of an article that criminalized LGBT people—Article 516 of the Criminal Code—after reading about the case of a French tourist who had been arrested. In 1994, Montoya presented cases of police abuse against LGBT people to delegates of the Inter-American Commission on Human Rights (IACHR) who were visiting the country in connection with the case of the Restrepo brothers. As a result of this meeting, the IACHR called on the Government of Ecuador to stop the violations of the rights of gender-diverse persons, but the State ignored the request.

After the police raid on the Bar Abanicos gay bar on 14 June 1997, in which detainees were abused, several LGBT organizations in Ecuador, including FEDAEPS, created a front under the name Triángulo Andino (Andean Triangle) to seek the decriminalization of homosexuality. Among the various prominent figures in this process were transgender activist Purita Pelayo and Montoya himself. As a result of this campaign and after a period of collecting signatures to file a lawsuit against article 516 of the Criminal Code, the Constitutional Court issued a ruling on 25 November 1997 that decriminalized homosexuality in the country.

=== Subsequent activism ===
After achieving the decriminalization of homosexuality, Montoya began working with the Andean Triangle collective to submit proposals to the Constituent Assembly of Ecuador of 1997 and 1998 which was in the process of drafting a new Constitution. In an interview with newspaper Hoy, Montoya stated that the next struggle would be to include the matter of non-discrimination in the text of the Constitution. However, this statement led to a break-up with Irene León, who was the director of FEDAEPS at the time, because the idea was to submit proposals together with feminist movements. In order to achieve the inclusion of non-discrimination in the Constitution, 4,000 signatures of support were delivered, a brief was submitted, and conversations were started with other groups, which helped the amendment to be finally included.

In 2005, together with activist Efraín Soria, he established the Equidad Foundation, which also focused on HIV/AIDS support and prevention. He was also a member of Kimirina Corporation. He died on 11 January 2021.

== See also ==
- LGBT rights in Ecuador
- Decriminalization of homosexuality in Ecuador
- LGBT rights in the Americas
- Case No. 111-97-TC
- Bar Abanicos police raid
- Timeline of LGBT history in Ecuador

== Bibliography ==
- Lalaleo, Andrés Alejandro (2016). Del personaje histórico al personaje ficcionalizado (PDF) (PHD in Social Sciences thesis) (in Spanish). University of Cuenca. Archived from the original (PDF) on 19 March 2020.
- Cardona, Luz Ángela (2019). Sotavento y Barlovento: el impacto de las interacciones societales y soio-estatales sobre los cambios legales relativos a la diversidad sexual en Perú y Ecuador (1980-2018) (PDF) (PHD in Social Sciences thesis). Latin American Faculty of Social Sciences. Archived from the original (PDF) on 20 August 2021.
- Mancero, Cristina (2007). La construcción del movimiento gay y sus manifestaciones sociales, culturales, y políticas en la ciudad de Quito (PDF) (Social anthropology thesis) (in Spanish). Latin American Faculty of Social Sciences. Archived from the original (PDF) on 10 July 2020.
- Aguiar, Juan Javier (August 2018). "Historia legal de la homosexualidad en el Ecuador". Novedades Jurídicas (in Spanish). XV (146): 50–61.
- Quintana, Yina; Pimentel, José Luis (2014). Balance y perspectivas de los derechos humanos de las personas LGBTI en el Ecuador (PDF) (in Spanish). Quito: Spanish Agency for International Development Cooperation (AECID). ISBN 978-9942-07-763-9. Archived from the original (PDF) on 3 November 2018.
- Ramos, Paulino (2019). Archivo, imágenes y cuerpo en el vigésimo aniversario de la despenalización de la homosexualidad en Ecuador (PDF) (MA in Visual Anthropology thesis) (in Spanish). Latin American Faculty of Social Sciences. Archived from the original (PDF) on 27 April 2021.
