= Gonzalo Abarca =

Ecuadorian LGBT activist (born 1954)

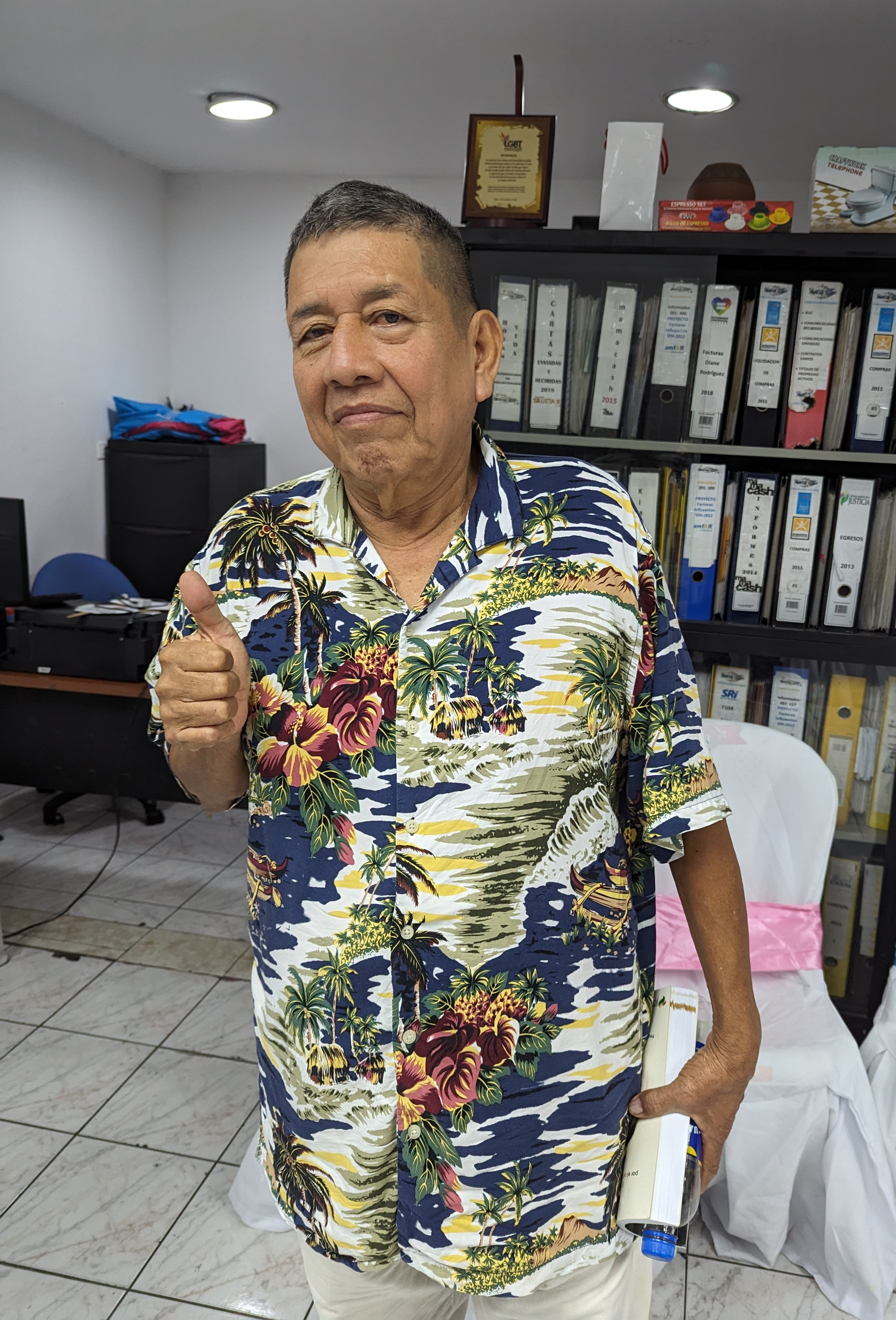
- Abarca in 2023
- Born: May 20, 1954 (age 71); Riobamba, Ecuador
- Occupation: LGBTQ activist

Gonzalo Abarca (Riobamba, born May 20, 1954) is an Ecuadorian LGBT rights activist. He was one of the founders and the first vice president of the Coccinelle Association, the first LGBTQ organization to obtain legal recognition in Ecuador. He was also one of the main activists who worked to achieve the decriminalization of homosexuality in Ecuador.

== Biography ==
During his youth he lived in Guayaquil, where he witnessed abuses committed by the authorities against LGBT people, particularly trans women. In the 1980s he began to help process the release ballots of trans women and gay men detained in the Model Barracks, a process through which he became known in the LGBT community. Abarca himself is bisexual.

In 1994 he moved to Quito and began a relationship with a transgender woman named Valeria, who helped him get closer to the city's transgender community. In Quito, he returned to the processing of release ballots for LGBT people, a process that was viewed at that time as a business by the police authorities, who expected to be financially compensated for approving the releases.

=== Founding of Coccinelle ===
After meeting transgender activist Purita Pelayo in 1997, he learned about the campaign to try to decriminalize homosexuality in Ecuador that the Fedaeps foundation had initiated and decided to support the cause. As representatives of the transgender community, Estrella Estévez, Purita Pelayo, and Abarca attended the meetings at Fedaeps. The group of transgender women from Quito was known in these meetings with the name of "Grupo de La Mariscal", since most of them worked in that sector, but after looking for a new name Abarca recommended Coccinelle, in honor of the French vedette of the same name, whom Abarca had seen during a visit to Guayaquil in the 1970s. This is how the Coccinelle Association was established, with Abarca as one of the founders.

Upon learning that one of the requirements to file a complaint with the Constitutional Tribunal to achieve decriminalization was the collection of a thousand signatures, Abarca proposed to take to the streets to personally ask for the signatures. For this action, the transgender women of Coccinelle were mobilized and held public events in both Quito and Guayaquil.

After gathering the required amount of signatures, Abarca was one of the people who signed the lawsuit to decriminalize homosexuality, which received the official name of Case No. 111-97-TC, along with Cristian Polo, Jimmy Wider Coronado Tello, Silvia Haro Proaño and José Urriola Pérez (name in the signature of Purita Pelayo), who were joined by Ernesto López, former president of the Constitutional Court. On November 25, 1997, the Constitutional Tribunal agreed with the plaintiffs and declared the first paragraph of article 516 of the Ecuadorian Criminal Code unconstitutional, this decriminalizing homosexuality in the country.

When Coccinelle was officially registered as an association, it became the first openly LGBT organization to achieve legal recognition in Ecuador and Purita Pelayo was appointed as president and Abarca as vice president of it. Abarca remained vice president of Coccinnelle from 1997 to 1999.

=== Later Activism ===
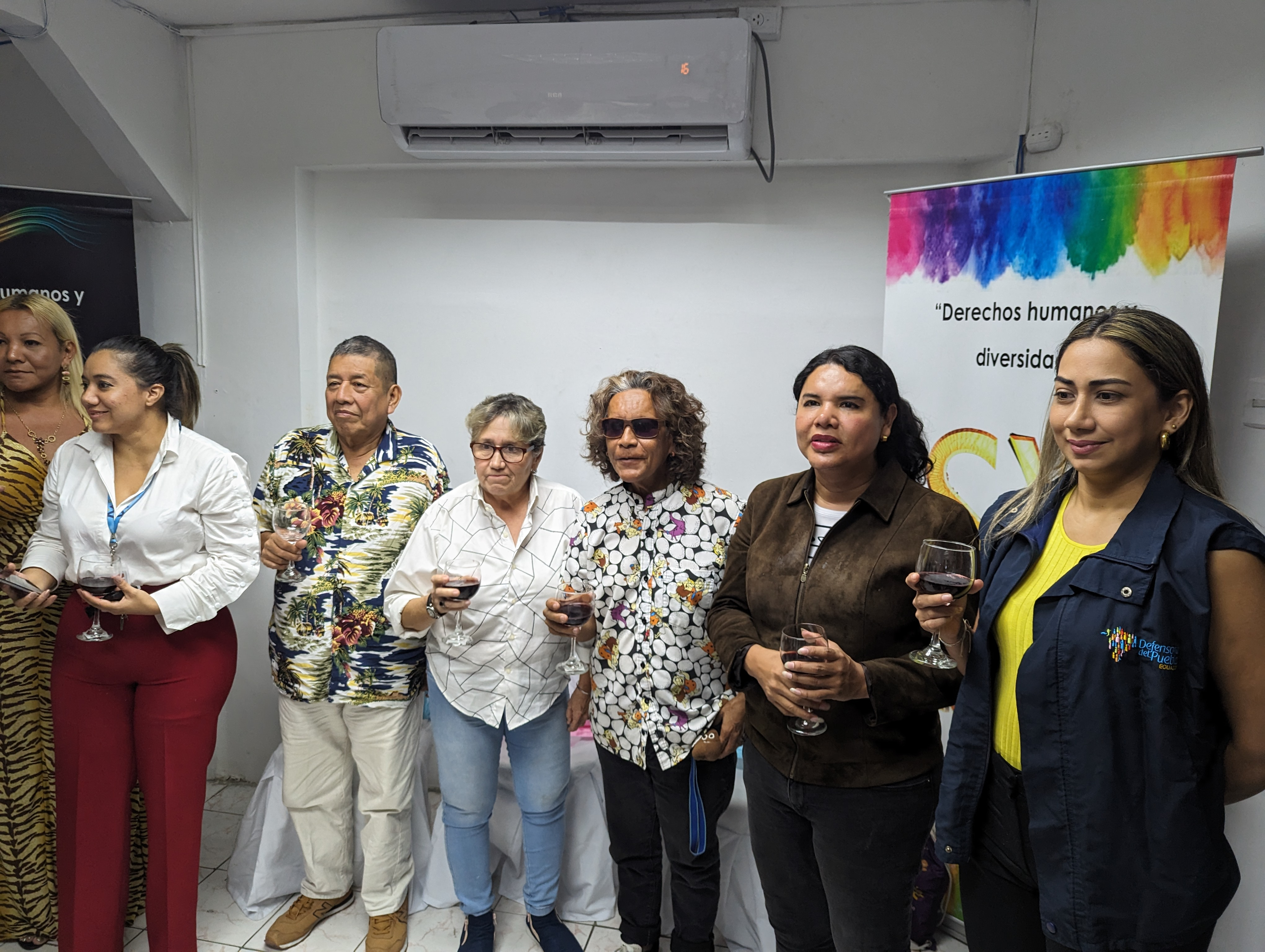
Gonzalo Abarca with other LGBT activists in 2023.

During the operation of the Ecuadorian Constituent Assembly of 2007 and 2008, Abarca was one of the LGBT activists who presented to the assembly members the agenda of requests of the LGBT populations with several of the proposals of the sector, some of which were accepted.

After leaving Coccinnelle, he was part of organizations such as Famivida (where he was in charge of the human rights department for ten years), Fundación Ecuatoriana Equidad and the LGBT Citizen Observatory. In 2012, as part of the latter organization, he was one of the representatives of a complaint filed with the Ombudsman's Office against the journalist José Delgado, who was accused of discrimination against LGBT people in one of his programs, although they finally reached an agreement with Delgado in which the journalist promised to receive awareness workshops taught by the same organization.

== See also ==
- LGBTQIA+ in Guayaquil

== Bibliography ==
- Lobato, Fredy, ed. (2023). Cuéntame una historia. Despenalización de la homosexualidad en Ecuador [Tell me a story. Decriminalization of homosexuality in Ecuador] (in Spanish). Fundación Equidad. ISBN 978-9942-7154-0-1.
- Ramos Ballesteros, Paulino (2019), Archivo, imágenes y cuerpo en el vigésimo aniversario de la despenalización de la homosexualidad en Ecuador [Archive, images, and body on the twentieth anniversary of the decriminalization of homosexuality in Ecuador] (PDF) (in Spanish), Quito: FLACSO, archived from the original (PDF) on 2021-04-27
