= Decriminalization of homosexuality in Ecuador =

The decriminalization of homosexuality in Ecuador took place on 25 November 1997, when the Constitutional Tribunal issued a landmark decision in Case 111-97-TC declaring the first clause of Article 516 of the Penal Code – which criminalized same-sex sexual relations as a crime with a penalty of four to eight years of imprisonment – unconstitutional. The ruling put an end to more than one hundred years of criminalization of homosexuality and was the result of a claim filed by different LGBTQ groups as a response to the police abuses usually experienced by sexually diverse individuals in Ecuador.

== Overview ==
Homosexuality had been outlawed in the country in 1871, but for a long time the issue remained unaddressed. This changed in the 1970s, when LGBT people started to gain visibility thanks to an increase in the urban population and the effect of international events such as the Stonewall riots. However, this caused an increase in police repression, particularly during León Febres-Cordero Ribadeneyra's presidency (1984–1988), when human rights violations were committed against different groups of people, including LGBT populations. Police repression persisted over the following years, leading to organizations such as FEDAEPS to start exploring strategies to change the law.

In 1997, Ecuador was going through a time of social protests and citizen demands that created a favorable environment to achieve the decriminalization of homosexuality. This period was characterized by demonstrations by students, women's groups, indigenous groups and other social actors who were protesting human rights violations and torture committed by the police during the Febres-Cordero administration. Additionally, in February of the same year, the country underwent a wave of protests that led to the removal of President Abdalá Bucaram.

It was in these circumstances that the Bar Abanicos, an LGBT establishment in the city of Cuenca, was violently raided by the police on the night of 14 June 1997. People arrested in the bar were abused, tortured and raped by police officers and other inmates during their detention.

What happened at Bar Abanicos became the catalyst that prompted – for the first time in the history of the country – the organization of a front formed by different groups of people from the LGBT community to seek the decriminalization of homosexuality. This front was named the Andean Triangle and included the organizations FEDAEPS, Coccinelle, Famivida and Tolerancia.

Following preliminary discussions, the organizations decided that the best strategy was to file an unconstitutionality claim against Article 516 of the Penal Code, which required the collection of 1,000 supporting signatures. The signature collection process marked the first time in Ecuador's history that LGBT people seized streets and public spaces. One of these events was the first demonstration of LGBT people in the country, held on 27 August 1997, through the streets of Quito and ending at Plaza Grande.

On 24 September 1997, the petition was filed along with 1400 supporting signatures, of which the allegations were based on three main arguments:

- That homosexuality was not a disease.
- That the existing law went against the constitutional principle of non-discrimination, and;
- That rights to sexuality were human rights.

On 25 November 1997, the Constitutional Court unanimously decriminalized homosexuality in Ecuador. The ruling went into effect two days later with its publication in the Official Registry. According to a poll conducted by the newspaper Hoy in 1997, 62% of Ecuadorians were in favor of decriminalizing homosexuality.

== Historical background ==
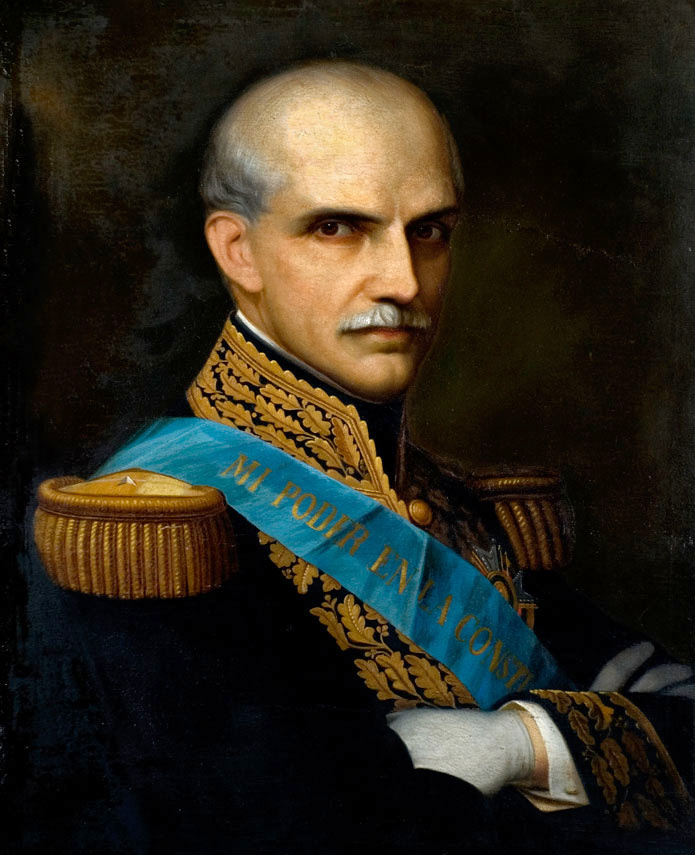
Homosexuality in Ecuador was criminalized in 1871, during the government of Gabriel García Moreno

Homosexuality was criminalized in Ecuador for the first time in the Penal Code of 1871, promulgated during the government of the conservative president Gabriel García Moreno. Article 401 of this legislation criminalized male homosexuality (referred to as "sodomy"), with a penalty of four to eight years of imprisonment. This penalty remained the same in the 1906 Penal Code, although it was moved to Article 364 and a subsection was added for cases in which the crime was committed by ministers of worship or teachers. Article 401 of the 1871 Code stated:

In cases of sodomy, the guilty parties shall be sentenced to four to eight years of imprisonment when no violence or threats are involved; eight to twelve years when one of these circumstances is involved, and with extraordinary imprisonment when the victim is a minor.

The same penalty as to the guilty parties shall apply to anyone who consented to or aided and abetted the crime or assault of this nature.

If the assault has been committed by the parents, the guilty party will be deprived, in addition, of the rights and prerogatives that the Civil Code grants over the person and property of the offspring.

In 1933, the Ecuadorian psychoanalyst and writer Humberto Salvador published the book Esquema sexual, highly successful in Latin America, in which he took a position against the criminalization of homosexuality in Ecuador based on clinical and scientific points of view. He also referred to the contradictory nature of the law prohibiting only male homosexuality (sodomy) and not female homosexuality, concluding that perhaps the authors of the Penal Code were attracted to the same sex and that "therefore, repression – speaking in Freudian terms – took on a character of maximum violence in them." He further stated: "It has been said that those who most harshly attack a sexual deviation are those who practice it or love it in secret. And this is an evident psychological truth." The next change in legislation regarding sexual diversity occurred in the 1938 Penal Code, which changed the word "sodomy" to "homosexuality" and thus broadened the crime to cover lesbian sexual relations. However, the second subsection went on to refer only male individuals. This article was originally 491, but years later it was moved to numeral 516 of the Penal Code and remained unchanged until 1997, when homosexuality was decriminalized by the Constitutional Court. The article contained the following three subsections:

1. In cases of homosexuality that do not involve rape, the two parties shall be punished with rigorous imprisonment for a term of four to eight years.

2. When homosexuality is committed by the parent or other ascendant in the person of the offspring or other descendant, the penalty shall be imprisonment for a term of eight to twelve years and deprivation of the rights and prerogatives that the Civil Code grants over the person and property of the offspring.

3. If it has been committed by ministers of worship, school teachers, professors or tutors, on the people entrusted to their direction or care, the penalty shall be rigorous imprisonment for a term of eight to twelve years.

=== Police repression ===
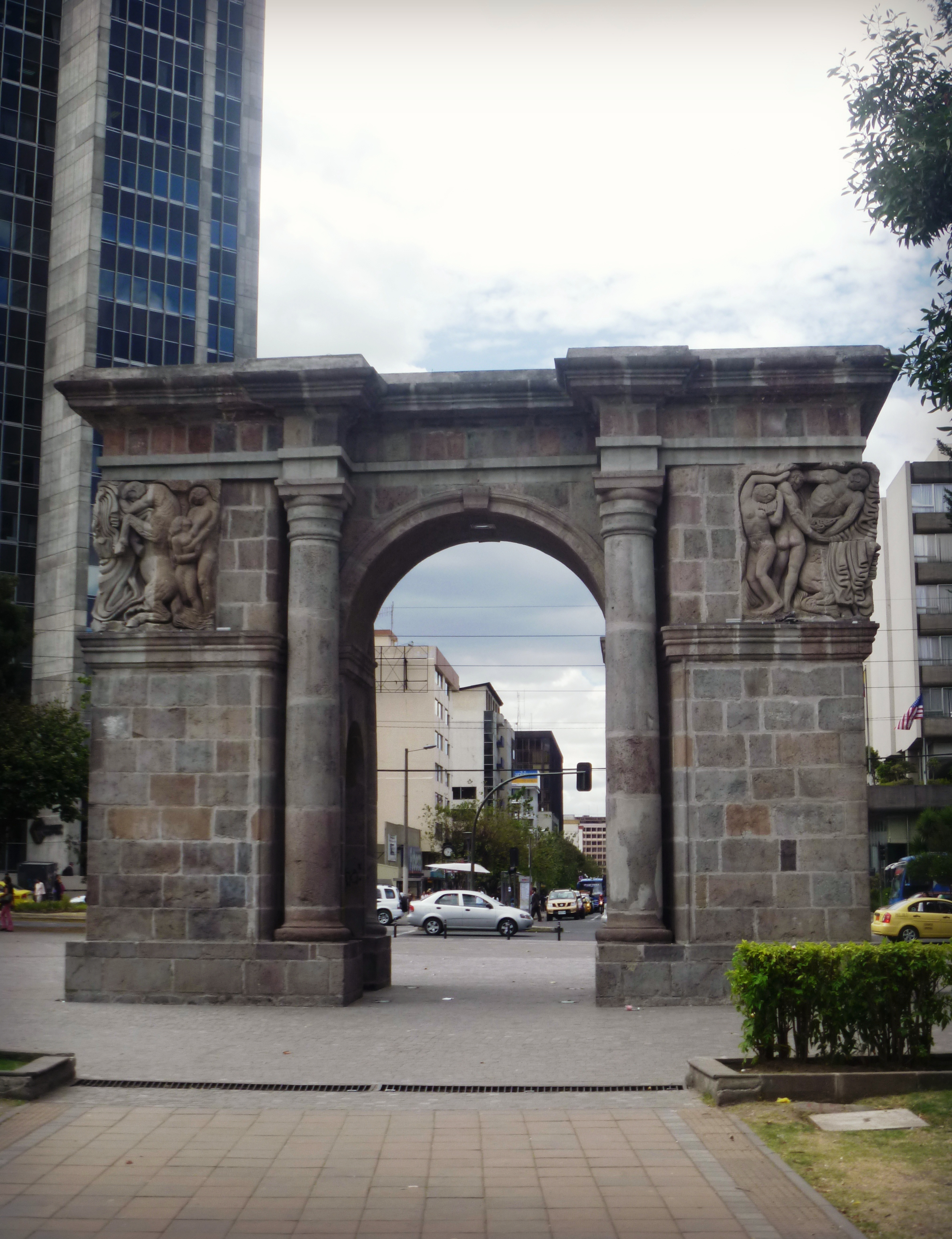
Police used to round up LGBT people at the door of the Circasiana in Parque El Ejido.

A considerable increase in the visibility of LGBT people in Ecuador took place in the last decades of the 20th century, influenced by the waves of migration to the big cities that occurred during the 1970s, as well as the impact of international events such as the Stonewall riots or May 1968 in France. However, this increased visibility resulted in an increase in police abuses and arrests, backed by conservative politicians. This subsequently sparked the emergence of LGBT activism in Ecuador and advocacy efforts to decriminalize homosexuality.

Police brutality intensified during the government of León Febres-Cordero (1984–1988). In May 1985, Febres-Cordero created the Escuadrones volantes, (Note: English: Mobile squads.) a group of special forces police that committed systematic violations of human rights and acts of torture with government consent. Among the targeted groups were sex workers, members of the LGBT community, or any man with characteristics they considered "effeminate".

Based on the testimony of activists of the time, the Febres-Cordero government instilled panic in the LGBT community, who would run as soon as they saw a police patrol or a flying squad member approaching. After being arrested, the data and photographs of many LGBT people made it into newspapers the following Monday with discriminatory headlines such as "cayeron por depravados" (Note: English: they fell [prisoners] because they were depraved.) or "cayeron por maricones." (Note: English: they fell [prisoners] because they were faggots.) Other detainees died under police custody, as in the case of a young gay man whose body was found the next day tied to a tree in the park with more than twenty stab wounds, or another whose body was found with signs of torture in the Machángara River.

Persecution of LGBT people by the police continued in the 1990s. Activist Jorge Medranda testified that transgender women and gay men with characteristics considered "effeminate" received the worst treatment during raids in bars and discotheques and were often beaten and pulled by the hair to be arrested. During these raids, one of the strategies used to avoid arrest was to switch dance partners between gay men and lesbian women to appear to be heterosexual couples. In cases where raids were faster, lesbian women often confronted the police to give the men and transgender women time to flee the scene.

== Beginning of the decriminalization process ==
During the 1990s, the Fundación Ecuatoriana de Acción y Educación para la Promoción de la Salud (FEDAEPS) (Note: English: Ecuadorian Foundation of Action and Education for the Promotion of Health.) – which was officially dedicated to preventing the spread of HIV but also carried out activities on behalf of LGBT rights – strengthened its links with foreign organizations, including the International Lesbian, Gay, Bisexual, Trans and Intersex Association (ILGA), through discussions where they shared strategies for activism and started submitting complaints about abuses against people from the LGBT community.

On 7 November 1994, the organizations used the presence in the country of a delegation from the Inter-American Commission on Human Rights (IACHR) to submit a report compiling data on cases of police abuse. The IACHR welcomed the report and urged Ecuador to comply with international treaties in terms of respect and protection of LGBT people, but the government ignored the request.

Throughout this period, FEDAEPS started to focus its efforts on highlighting the importance of achieving the decriminalization of homosexuality in Ecuador. The foundation's connections with ILGA were of particular help for this purpose, since during its 1995 world conference – held 18–25 June in Rio de Janeiro – the association called for campaigns to decriminalize homosexuality in Ecuador, Chile and Nicaragua.

After the destitution of President Abdalá Bucaram in early 1997 and the installation of Fabián Alarcón as interim president, foreign LGBT organizations allied with FEDAEPS began to hold sit-ins at international forums attended by President Alarcón to demand the decriminalization of homosexuality. Simultaneously, members of FEDAEPS initiated a lobbying process in Congress to pursue the abolition of the criminalization of homosexuality, for which they held meetings with congressmen such as José Cordero, of the Popular Democracy party. During this period, the Bar Abanicos raid took place in Cuenca, an event widely acknowledged as the catalyst for the decriminalization process.

=== Bar Abanicos raid ===
The night of 14 June 1997, members of the national police carried out a violent raid at Bar Abanicos, a popular LGBT establishment located in Vargas Machuca and Juan Jaramillo streets, in the city of Cuenca, where the election of the city's first Gay Queen was taking place. Four candidates participated in the event, and Patricio Cuéllar – known as "Briggitte" – became the winner. Police officers commanded by Diego Crespo burst in then and arrested everyone present. Cuéllar was among those arrested and was carried away by the officers, who prevented him from removing his dress and the queen's sash throughout the three days he was detained.

Disagreements exist as to the number of detainees. According to the International Gay and Lesbian Human Rights Commission, 14 people were arrested, whereas police superintendent and Patricio himself stated that there were 63.

Upon arrival at the city's pretrial detention center, the detainees were locked up with the rest of the prisoners in overcrowded conditions. Cuéllar and his comrades were repeatedly raped by several inmates. Instead of helping them, the policemen who witnessed the scene opted to sell condoms to the inmates for 5,000 sucres per unit. Amidst the attacks, one of the detainees suffered an epileptic seizure, but when they called for help, one of the guards responded: "déjenle que se muera, un maricón menos, mucho mejor" (Note: English: let him die, one less faggot, all the better.) The detainees were also tortured by some police officers, who took them out of the cells to kick them, spit on them and humiliate them, submerging their heads in toilets and giving them electric shocks.

In the following days, the local press published news about the raid with headlines such as "Clausuran antro de homosexuales" (Note: English: Homosexual joint shut down.) or "Presos por fiesta sodomita", (Note: English: Arrested for sodomy party.) which contained pejorative language and even a cartoon that mocked the event. On the day they were released, Cuéllar and a friend of his met with Jaime Terreros, an LGBT activist in the city, to tell him what had happened. Terreros decided to file a complaint with the Human Rights Commission of Azuay and personally approached the city's media to demand a less discriminatory treatment and to recount the abuses suffered during the detentions, which led to a change in coverage to focus on the denunciation against the police, particularly considering that there were members of upper class families from Cuenca among the detainees.

== Decriminalization campaign ==
FEDAEPS found out about the events in Cuenca after being contacted by a member of the Cuenca-based organization La Pájara Pinta, which had been led by the then governor of Azuay, Felipe Vega de la Cuadra. Activists Orlando Montoya, who belonged to FEDAEPS, and Neptalí Arias, a member of Famivida foundation, traveled to Cuenca and held meetings with activists and personalities in the city, including Governor Vega, who publicly denounced the actions of the police during the raid.

The events at Bar Abanicos were soon covered by the national press and were taken up as a banner of struggle against the criminalization of homosexuality by the various LGBT groups existing in the country. Organizations that joined were: FEDAEPS (which had been working on sexual diversity issues for the past decade), Coccinelle Association (created the same year in Quito to denounce police abuses against transgender women), Famivida (the first LGBT organization in Guayaquil), and the Tolerancia group (formed by upper class LGBT people including actor Diego Mignone). Other activists included Milagros Torres, who was the only visible cisgender woman in the process.

These groups came together on 12 July 1997, in what was the first national LGBT movement in Ecuador, under the name of the Triángulo Andino, (Note: English: Andean Triangle.) that led the process to decriminalize homosexuality. The name Triángulo Andino was chosen as a way to vindicate the figure of the pink triangle, used during World War II by the Nazi to single out homosexuals.

Coccinelle Association promoted the first discussions among the communities and focused on defining the best method to achieve decriminalization. FEDAEPS and the Fundación Regional de Asesoría en Derechos Humanos (Note: English: Regional Human Rights Advisory Foundation.) (INREDH) have been working to promote the idea of change through the National Congress. This first lobbying process won the support of some legislators, including Rosendo Rojas, deputy of the province of Azuay for the Pachakutik Plurinational Unity Movement, who was very much in favor of decriminalization. However, the Permanent Assembly for Human Rights (APDH), a body close to Coccinelle Association, pointed out two issues to this strategy: that the country had not had a national debate to bring about change through Congress, and that even after lobbying, they could not hand such a major change to over 90 congressmen, many of whom were conservatives.

This led APDH to propose a second route, consisting of making the change by means of an unconstitutionality claim against Article 516 of the Penal Code, a strategy favored by Coccinelle Association. In the end, it was decided that the best option was an action of unconstitutionality. To file the claim, they were advised by Ernesto López, who had been president of the Constitutional Tribunal until February of that year and who guided them through the process – which required the collection of 1,000 supporting signatures. The claim was written by attorney Cristian Polo Loayza, a member of FEDAEPS, who had to draft three versions of the unconstitutionality claim before Lopez gave his approval.

=== Signature collection ===
The signature collection process marked the first time in Ecuador's history that LGBT people seized streets and public spaces. The collection was also carried out in bars, nightclubs and other places frequented by LGBT individuals. Since many gay men and lesbian women were closeted and feared being recognized if they gave their signature, the majority of support came from heterosexual people.

Coccinelle Association became prominent during the collection process and on 27 August of the same year, organized a transgender women, gay men and human rights defenders march that went through the streets of Quito and ended at Plaza Grande, where they joined groups demanding justice for missing persons and managed to get 300 signatures for decriminalization. This demonstration had a historic character for being the first march of LBGT people in the country.

On 17 September, Guayaquil held the first public demonstration of LGBT people in its history, as part of the signature collection process. Other demonstrations were held in Cuenca and Machala.

Other strategies used during the campaign included the use of graffiti to promote messages such as "Despenalización ahora" (Note: English: Decriminalization now.) and even an invitation to interim president Fabián Alarcón to discuss the issue. Demands for decriminalization received support from several influential public figures and progressive sectors of the local press, including politician Julio César Trujillo, or academics Raúl Vallejo and César Montúfar, both of whom authored op-ed pieces denouncing discrimination based on sexual orientation. One of the most important supporters, according to activists of the time, was Luis Alberto Luna Tobar, bishop of Cuenca, who described as inhuman the criminalization of homosexuality both on television and in the written media and declared:

"The homosexual man or woman does not lose humanity and, therefore, has all human rights and must be respected in their situation as any other human being."

Another prominent figure who supported decriminalization was the then governor of Azuay, Felipe Vega de la Cuadra, as well as the chef and television presenter Gino Molinari, who was among those able to collect the largest number of signatures in Guayaquil.

The collection campaign also provoked new acts of violence against LGBT people. Among the victims was activist José Miguel Moreira, who participated in the signature collection and was found dead in early September. At least 16 trans women were also murdered over those months, so they initiated self-protection strategies with APDH. There was constant harassment against the activists by the police and it did not stop until a public announcement was made, conceived by activists Gonzalo Abarca and Purita Pelayo, where they communicated that if the attacks did not stop, they would publish a list with all the names of police and political authorities who had hired transgender sex workers.

== Unconstitutionality claim ==
On 24 September 1997, the unconstitutionality claim against Article 516 was filed, which was registered as Case No. 111-97-TC, at the Constitutional Court along with 1400 supporting signatures (400 more than required). The documents were presented by Cristian Polo Loayza, Jimmy Wider Coronado Tello, Silvia Haro Proaño, José Urriola Pérez and Gonzalo Abarca, who were joined by Ernesto López, former president of the Court. According to jurist Judith Salgado, the arguments outlined in the unconstitutionality claim can be summarized in three items:

1. Homosexuality is neither a crime nor a disease, for which they presented statements from the American Psychiatric Association (APA) and the World Health Organization (WHO).

2. The criminalization of homosexuality contravenes constitutional rights, specifically Article 22 of the Constitution, which prohibited discrimination of any kind.

3. Rights to sexuality are human rights, which is why they asked the Court to explicitly recognize them.

Once the claim was approved, the Constitutional Court sent a series of letters to Fabián Alarcón (Interim President of the Republic), Heinz Moeller (president of the National Congress) Carlos Solórzano Constantine (president of the National Court of Justice), César Verduga (minister of government and police), Jamil Mahuad (mayor of Quito), León Febres-Cordero Ribadeneyra (mayor of Guayaquil), and Fernando Cordero Cueva (mayor of Cuenca) to gather their views on the case and ask if in their respective jurisdictions people had been prosecuted based on Article 516. Letters requesting views were also sent to José Mario Ruiz Navas, president of the Ecuadorian Episcopal Conference, and to bishop Luis Alberto Luna Tobar.

In his response, President Alarcón asserted that the decriminalization of homosexuality should take place because the article in question was not applied in practice, but that it was not considered unconstitutional. He further stated that decriminalization was a matter for the National Congress and not for the Constitutional Court. In turn, Minister Verduga pointed out that he did not find any records of anyone prosecuted under Article 516. Meanwhile, the Ecuadorian Episcopal Conference was in favor of withdrawing the first clause of the article for "an application of the principles of democratic tolerance and respect for the privacy of individuals", although in the same letter it rejected the existence of a right to sexuality. Another response came from the country's Foreign Ministry, which noted:

Homosexuality is an option, a situation inherent to any person, a personal decision. Therefore, the criminalization of homosexuality is unconstitutional and against human rights.

In response to international pressure in favor of decriminalization, the United Nations (UN) sent two representatives to meet with the Constitutional Court judges personally and urge them to accept the petition. Additionally, thanks to an international campaign by human rights organizations, among them ILGA, a large number of letters arrived in the country from international organizations addressed to the Constitutional Court and requesting the decriminalization of homosexuality. According to Ernesto Lopez, former president of the Constitutional Court, the entity received letters of support for the claim in about 18 different languages.

Simultaneously, the organizations that were part of the Triángulo Andino continued to carry out activities and sit-ins. By early October, LGBT activists contacted Monsignor Luna Tobar to request a mass in favor of LGBT people, but he did not accept the proposal. Then they contacted Anglican Bishop Walter Crespo, who agreed to hold a religious service in the Plaza de la Independencia to promote the message that "Homosexuals are also children of God." During the service, they took the opportunity to denounce police harassment and abuses against members of the LGBT community, in particular the members of Coccinelle Association.

=== Constitutional Court's verdict ===
On 25 November 1997, the Constitutional Court unanimously ruled on the case. It accepted the petition partially and declared unconstitutional the first clause of Article 516 of the Penal Code, thus decriminalizing homosexuality in Ecuador. The Court decided not to declare the entire article unconstitutional and allowed the second and third paragraphs – regarding homosexual relations between parents and children or involving certain authority figures, such as teachers or ministers of worship – to remain in force The ruling came into effect two days later with its publication in the Official Gazette.

Although the verdict upheld the plaintiffs, activists and academics such as jurist Judith Salgado called the language used by the Court in the ruling discriminatory because it referred to homosexuality as a "dysfunction" and "abnormal behavior" and asserted that "the protection of the family and minors" demanded that it not be "socially exalted behavior". Salgado also criticized that the article was not abolished in its entirety, given that there were already other articles that criminalized rape in the Penal Code, so maintaining the rest of Article 516 represented, in Salgado's words, a "discriminatory over-specification".

Nevertheless, the decision was received as a huge success by the plaintiff organizations. After the verdict was announced, LGBT activists started a celebratory march in Quito along 10 de Agosto Avenue leading to Plaza de la Independencia.

== See also ==
- LGBT rights in Ecuador
- Same-sex marriage in Ecuador
- LGBT rights in the Americas
- LGBT literature in Ecuador
- Timeline of LGBT history in Ecuador
- LGBTQIA+ in Guayaquil

== Bibliography ==
- Buendía, Silvia (2019). "Desde la vergüenza hacia el orgullo. El trayecto que nos permitió dejar de ser delincuentes y empezar a ser ciudadanos". Violencia, géneros y derechos en el territorio (1 ed.). Quito: Abya-Yala. ISBN 978-9942-09-633-3. OCLC 1110088345.
- Cardona, Luz (2019). Sotavento y Barlovento: el impacto de las interacciones societales y socio-estatales sobre los cambios legales relativos a la diversidad sexual en Perú y Ecuador (1980–2018) (PDF). FLACSO México. Archived from the original (PDF) on 20 August 2021.
- Montoya, Cristina (2015). Al otro lado del espejo: representación y homosexualidad en el festival de cine LGBT "El Lugar sin límites" de Ecuador (PDF) (masterThesis). Archived from the original on 27 April 2021.
- Páez, Carolina (2010). Travestismo urbano: género, sexualidad y política (PDF) (1st ed.). Quito: Abya-Yala. ISBN 978-9978-67-229-7. OCLC 641692060. Archived from the original (PDF) on 9 August 2021.
- Garrido, Rafael (2017). La despenalización de la homosexualidad en Ecuador: el legado de la acción colectiva LGBTI (PDF). Quito: Universidad Andina Simón Bolívar. Archived from the original (PDF) on 14 February 2021.
- González, Daniela (2021). Reconstrucción de la historia del movimiento LGBTI+ en Cuenca en el periodo 1997–2017, a través de historias de vida (PDF). Cuenca: Universidad de Cuenca. Archived from the original (PDF) on 19 April 2022.
- Ramos Ballesteros, Paulino (2019). Archivo, imágenes y cuerpo en el vigésimo aniversario de la despenalización de la homosexualidad en Ecuador (PDF). FLACSO. Quito. Archived from the original (PDF) on 27 April 2021.
- Salgado, Judith (2005). Análisis de la interpretación de inconstitucionalidad de la penalización de la homosexualidad en el Ecuador (PDF) (in Spanish). Derechos sexuales en el Ecuador. Archived from the original (PDF) on 2 November 2018.
- Valdez, David (2019). Sistematización de la experiencia de conceptualización e implementación de la estrategia de RR.PP. del proyecto Zoom durante el 2019 (PDF). Universidad Casa Grande. Guayaquil. Archived from the original (PDF) on 12 April 2021.
