= Bar Abanicos police raid =

Police raid against homosexuals in Cuenca, Ecuador, 1997

- Date: June 14, 1997
- Location: Cuenca, Ecuador; 2.901003°S 79.000447°W
- Type: Police raid

The former Bar Abanicos

The Bar Abanicos police raid took place on the night of June 14, 1997, in the city of Cuenca, Ecuador. During the raid, the police arrested homosexual and transgender people who had come to the bar for the election of the city's first gay queen. Some of the detainees were tortured and raped inside the jail, with the consent of the police.

The event generated reactions of rejection at the national level and was the trigger for different LGBTQ sectors to organize for the first time in the country and initiate a campaign for the decriminalization of homosexuality in Ecuador, which in November of the same year achieved its goal when the Constitutional Court declared that the first paragraph of Article 516 of the Criminal Code, which criminalized homosexuality with a sentence of four to eight years, was unconstitutional.

== The raid ==
Bar Abanicos was a popular establishment located on Vargas Machuca and Juan Jaramillo streets, where on the night of June 14, 1997, the election of the first gay queen of Cuenca took place. Four candidates participated in the event, among whom Patricio Cuéllar, known as "Brigitte", was named the winner. After the election, a party was held at the bar and, after eleven o'clock at night, members of the police commanded by Mayor Diego Crespo burst into the place and proceeded to arrest those attending the event, separating them into a line for "heterosexuals" and another for "maricones". (Note: English: faggots.) When several of those present resisted arrest, the police used force, as a result of which several people were injured. Some of those present managed to escape amidst the chaos through a window at the back of the bar.

Cuéllar was among those arrested and was taken to the detention center by the police, who prevented him from removing his dress and queen's sash during the three days he was detained. The event was later reported by the authorities in homophobic terms in the news media, among them Mayor Crespo himself, who stated that he regretted that "attacks against morals like this one" were occurring in Cuenca.

Upon arrival at the city's preventive detention center, the detainees were locked up with the rest of the prisoners in overcrowding conditions. Cuéllar and others of his companions were repeatedly raped by several inmates. Instead of helping them, the police officers who witnessed the scene opted to sell condoms to the prisoners for 5,000 sucres a unit. In the midst of the aggressions, one of the detainees suffered an epileptic attack, but when they asked for help, one of the police officers responded: "déjenle que se muera, un maricón menos, mucho mejor" (Note: English: let him die, one less faggot, all the better.) The detainees also suffered torture by some police officers, who took them out of the cells to kick them, spit on them, humiliate them, submerge their heads in toilets, and give them electric shocks.

There are different versions about the exact number of detainees. According to an article published by the newspaper El Tiempo, two days after the event, during the operation, the police arrested 63 people, a figure corroborated by the mayor, Diego Crespo. However, days later the same newspaper lowered the figure to ten people and justified the arrests by stating that the detainees "were the protagonists of scandals". The newspaper El Comercio raised the figure to 100 people imprisoned, as did El Telégrafo newspaper. The OutRight Action International, for its part, spoke of 14 people imprisoned. Years later, Cuéllar reaffirmed the figure of 63 detainees.

== Subsequent events ==
The detainees were released on June 16, although Mayor Crespo tried to prevent Cuéllar's release. In the following days, the local press began to publish news about the raid with discriminatory headlines, such as "Clausuran antro de homosexuales" (Note: English: Homosexual joint shut down.) or "Presos por fiesta sodomita", (Note: English: Arrested for sodomy party.) in addition to a homophobic caricature published in the newspaper El Tiempo showing Cuéllar and Mayor Crespo.

Cuéllar and a friend of his met the day they were released with Jaime Terreros, an LGBTQ activist in the city, and told him what had happened. Terreros decided to file a complaint with the Human Rights Commission of Azuay and to personally approach the city's media to demand less discriminatory treatment and to report on the abuses suffered during the arrests, which generated more positive coverage, particularly considering that among the detainees were members of upper-class families from Cuenca. However, making the complaint resulted in Terreros being harassed by the police for months, while Cuéllar lost his job at a hairdresser's.

Shortly thereafter, students from the Faculty of Arts of the University of Cuenca decided to make an installation in Calderon Park in favor of sexual diversity, but the municipality denied the corresponding permits due to the influence of people close to Opus Dei. However, the students ignored the refusal and gathered in the park during the early hours of the morning to set up the installation, which included a bed with a sign that read "Sáquenme de aquí" and colored condoms filled with water. Monsignor Luis Alberto Luna Tobar was in favor of the demonstration and during a mass spoke in favor of respect for homosexual persons.

Ten days after the raid, the newspaper El Comercio followed up on the events and reported that, according to the police, the official cause of the arrest had been "public scandal" and "indecent dress". However, Mayor Crespo himself acknowledged that the detainees had not been involved in fights and were not semi-naked. The newspaper report also revealed that the raid was carried out after the police received a letter on May 30 of the same year, with signatures from local residents and supported by the faculty of jurisprudence of the Catholic University of Cuenca, requesting that the bar be closed due to the "immoral conduct" of the clientele and the "scandal" they generated. This was despite the fact that the block had two additional bars.

=== Decriminalization of homosexuality ===
The events in Bar Abanicos came to the attention of the LGBTQ organization Fundación Ecuatoriana de Acción y Educación para la Promoción de la Salud (FEDAEPS) (Note: English: Ecuadorian Foundation of Action and Education for the Promotion of Health.) thanks to the contact of a member of the Cuenca organization La Pájara Pinta, which had been led by the then governor of Azuay, Felipe Vega de la Cuadra. Activists Orlando Montoya, a member of FEDAEPS, and Neptalí Arias, a member of Famivida (Fundación Amigos por la Vida), (Note: English: Friends for Life Foundation.) traveled to Cuenca and held meetings with activists and personalities from Cuenca, one of whom was Governor Vega, who denounced the actions of the police during the raid.

As a result, the organizations FEDAEPS, Famivida, Tolerancia and Coccinelle decided to form a single front under the name Triángulo Andino, (Note: English: Andean Triangle.) to fight for the decriminalization of homosexuality and to protest against abuses committed against people of sexual diversity. After initial discussions, it was decided to file, with the help of the Permanent Assembly for Human Rights, an action of unconstitutionality against Article 516 of the Criminal Code, which criminalized homosexuality with a sentence of four to eight years. Much of the campaign took place in Quito, where activists from the group held the first LGBT demonstration in the history of the country on August 27, 1997.

The next step before being able to present the unconstitutionality action before the Constitutional Court was the collection of 1,000 signatures, a process in which the Permanent Assembly for Human Rights and the trans association Coccinelle took the lead. The campaign finally succeeded in collecting 1,400 signatures and the petition was presented to the Court in September 1997. On November 25 of the same year, the nine members of the Constitutional Court ruled unanimity in favor of the repeal of the first paragraph of Article 516. The decision was published in the Official Gazette two days later, thus decriminalizing homosexuality in Ecuador.

== See also ==
- LGBT rights in Ecuador
- Timeline of LGBT history in Ecuador

== Bibliography ==
- González, Daniela (2021). Reconstrucción de la historia del movimiento LGBTI+ en Cuenca en el periodo 1997-2017, a través de historias de vida (PDF) (in Spanish). Cuenca: Universidad de Cuenca. Archived from the original (PDF) on April 19, 2022.
- Cardona, Luz (2019). Sotavento y Barlovento: el impacto de las interacciones societales y socio-estatales sobre los cambios legales relativos a la diversidad sexual en Perú y Ecuador (1980-2018) (PDF) (in Spanish). FLACSO México. Archived from the original (PDF) on August 20, 2021.
- Páez, Carolina (2010). Travestismo urbano: género, sexualidad y política (PDF) (in Spanish). Abya-Yala. ISBN 978-9978-67-229-7. Archived from the original (PDF) on August 9, 2021.
