= Escuadrones volantes =

Elite squads operating in Ecuador in the '80s

Mobile Squads
- Escuadrones volantes
- Active: 1985–1988
- Country: Ecuador
- Agency: National Police of Ecuador
- Type: Special forces

The Escuadrones volantes (lit. "flying squads", English: Mobile squads), also known as Escuadrones de la muerte (Death squads), were elite units of the National Police of Ecuador that were created in May 1985 by conservative President León Febres-Cordero Ribadeneyra. The units launched a systematic, government-backed campaign of human rights violations and acts of torture in the name of fighting crime and subversion. According to a report submitted by the Truth Commission—created in 2007 by the Office of the Attorney General of Ecuador—during the three years that they were in operation, the mobile squads perpetrated 32 extrajudicial killings, 12 attacks, and 9 enforced disappearances, and were involved in 214 cases of unlawful imprisonment, 275 acts of torture, and 72 cases of sexual abuse. Among the most notorious crimes perpetrated by the mobile squads are those of the Restrepo Arismendi brothers, Professor Consuelo Benavides, and blue-collar worker Jaime Otavalo, as well as Arturo Jarrín and Fausto Basantes, leaders of subversive groups. Febres-Cordero always refused to assume responsibility for the crimes and claimed not to have authorized any of the instances of torture or murder. However, Juan Vela—who was a member of the Social Christian Party along with Febres-Cordero during the latter’s administration—confessed to the Truth Commission that the former president had given the order to carry out acts of torture. The mobile squads were eliminated in 1988 by President Rodrigo Borja Cevallos, who succeeded Febres-Cordero.

== Creation ==
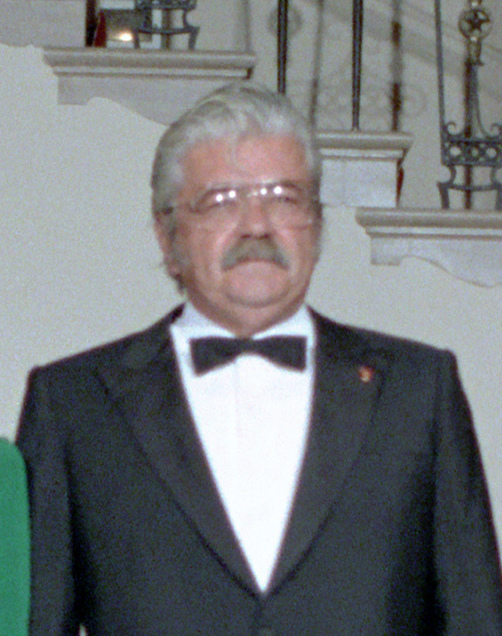
León Febres-Cordero Ribadeneyra, creator of the Mobile Squads

The mobile squads were created on 23 May 1985 during an event that took place in the sector of El Guasmo, south of Guayaquil. Present at the event were President Febres-Cordero, Provincial Governor Jaime Nebot, and Regional Police Commander Hólguer Santana. At the time, Nebot made the following statements to the police officers who were present:

Ustedes, policías, tienen órdenes precisas, claras; tenéis el respaldo moral, legal y económico del Gobierno (...) Usad las armas porque están facultados para ello. Ya saldrán las cotorras nuevamente a clamar por los derechos humanos, pero por los derechos humanos de los asesinos, de los delincuentes, de los terroristas, de los violadores y de los secuestradores (...) Porque si una mínima porción, ínfima porción, la porción podrida de la sociedad, tiene que caer abatida, tendrá que caer abatida. (Note: English: You, police officers, have precise, clear orders. You have the moral, legal, and economic support of the Government (...) Use your weapons because you are authorized to do so. The usual loudmouths will once again protest in favor of human rights, but for the human rights of murderers, criminals, terrorists, rapists, and kidnappers (...) Because if a small portion, a minuscule portion, the rotten portion of society, has to be knocked down, then it will have to be knocked down.)

According to Xavier Flores, a lawyer and specialist in human rights, the administration of Febres-Cordero attempted from the beginning to take up the banner of the fight against “crime and terrorism” in order to stir a generalized feeling of lack of security and danger. The goal was to get public opinion to focus on the alleged results of the mobile squads and ignore the human rights violations they were perpetrating.

== Mode of operation ==
The mobile squads were financed with money from the private sector. They moved around in blue pickup trucks with ample space in the cargo beds to transport the detainees. Each vehicle carried five to seven heavily armed police officers with their faces covered to avoid being identified. According to Hugo España, a retired police officer who was a member of one of the squads, around 95% of the people they arrested were innocent, but the squads went out into the streets with the aim of bringing in as many detainees as possible in order to show the media the supposedly positive results of their work. The detainees were taken to the Cuartel Modelo (Note: English: model headquarters) in Guayaquil, to military installations, or to clandestine houses.

In addition to arrests, the mobile squads were used by the government to quell citizen protests, such as the labor strike by the Frente Unitario de los Trabajadores (Note: English: United Workers’ Front) on 17 September 1986, or the strike of 1 June 1988, in which workers’ unions and indigenous groups took part, and which were violently dispersed.

== Acts of Torture ==
Although at the beginning the squads had only one target—the members of subversive group ¡Alfaro Vive, Carajo! (Note: English: Alfaro Lives, Dammit!)—their line of action was later expanded when they launched a so-called "fight against crime." In fact, the report by the Truth Commission revealed that only 19% of those who were tortured and murdered had ties to Alfaro Vive, while the rest were members of civil society.

As part of this new line of action, the mobile squads used to patrol the streets of various cities at night and arrest anyone who looked suspicious or who they determined was undesirable. It was a sort of social cleansing campaign, and those targeted included female sex workers, members of the LGBT community, or any man with features they deemed "effeminate." Activist Gonzalo Abarca, who helped arrange the release of several female detainees, reported years later that trans women in particular were beaten, raped, and tortured. As part of a report submitted by the Inter-American Commission on Human Rights, Mabell García, a trans woman who is a survivor of torture, described that they used to be taken to the Cuartel Modelo and forced to "perform abhorrent acts" just because they were wearing women’s clothing. In 2015, a trans woman by the name of Alondra gave the following testimony about human rights violations perpetrated by the squads:

Los escuadrones volantes nos metían en el camión y nos llevaban al Centro de Detención Provisional de Guayaquil. Allí ocurrían los atropellos más horribles que te puedas imaginar. Obligaban a las chicas travestis a servir sexualmente a los presos y a los policías, nos violaban, nos pegaban y si intentábamos reclamar nos amenazaban con dejarnos presas más tiempo. Muchas chicas trans aparecían muertas en la Perimetral con cortes, mutilaciones y nadie podía reclamar nada. (Note: English: The mobile squads put us in the truck and took us to the Pre-Trial Detention Center of Guayaquil. The most horrible abuse that you can imagine took place there. They forced the trans girls to sexually service the inmates and the police officers; they raped us, they beat us, and if we tried to complain, they threatened to keep us in prison for longer. Many trans girls were found dead along Perimetral Avenue with cuts, mutilations, and no one could complain.)

The arrests also focused on student leaders, even those who had no ties to Alfaro Vive. That is what happened to Jorge Dumet, who in 1985 was arrested at his home for having been a student leader in high school. When they did not find any weapons or incriminating evidence, the police officers took a copy of Das Kapital, by Karl Marx, as so-called evidence. Dumet was blindfolded, taken to the Cuartel Modelo, and later hung by his thumbs as a form of torture. During the next 20 days, he was subjected to various types of physical and psychological torture that left him with lifelong physical deformations in his phalanges.

Also arrested were those who protested against deficiencies in public services, as was the case of Nelson Quinde, a neighborhood activist who was arrested near Perimetral Avenue by a mobile squad and taken to the terrace of the Governor's Office in Guayas after having participated in a protest. Once there, he began to be beaten by the officers with the butts of their guns. Then, they dunk him in water tanks to suffocate him, kicked him, and put bags with tear gas over his head. According to Quinde, these actions were briefly witnessed by Governor Jaime Nebot when he went upstairs to talk to one of the officers, who reportedly ignored the incident.

Other types of torture described in the report by the Truth Commission included: depriving the detainees of food, preventing them from sleeping, beating them constantly with blunt objects, applying electric shocks when they did not react, suffocating them with wet rags, and simulating that they were going to be killed. One of the survivors also reported that their torturers used to spit in the food they were given and prevented them from bathing for up to 15 days.

Even after they were sentenced, the abuses continued for many of the detainees, as the so-called "cell of revenge" had been established at the Litoral Penitentiary, where all detainees with ties to Alfaro Vive were tortured. This place was shut down after the inmates staged a 17-day hunger strike to demand that the government reintegrate them into the prison wards.

== See also ==
- Death squad
- León Febres Cordero
- Social Christian Party (Ecuador)
- Decriminalization of homosexuality in Ecuador
- LGBT rights in Ecuador
- Timeline of LGBT history in Ecuador
