= Mabell García =

Ecuadorian activist and lawyer (born 1964)

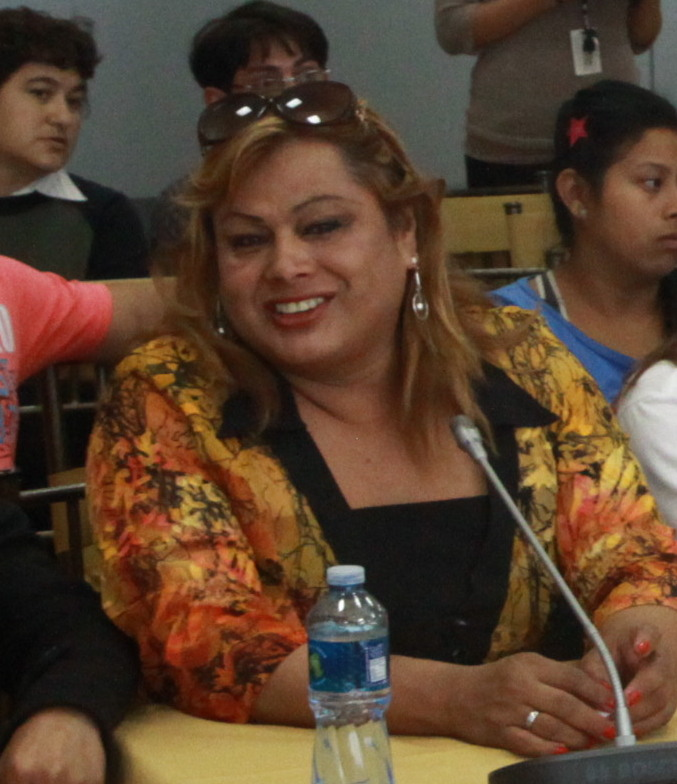
- García in 2012
- Born: 1964 (age 61–62); Ecuador
- Occupations: LGBTQ activist; lawyer

Sharon Mabell García Lucas (born 1964) is an Ecuadorian LGBT activist and lawyer. She was the first transgender person to run for public office in Ecuador, as well as the first transgender person to graduate from law school in the country.

She is the director of the Peninsular Transgender Foundation (Futpen). She is also one of the subjects in the documentary A imagen y semejanza (2008), by documentarian Diana Varas.

== Biography ==
Due to the rejection of her gender identity by her family, she left her home at the age of 16. She worked as an interior decorator, cashier, and hairdresser. At the age of 26, she moved to the city of Santa Elena.

During conservative President León Febres-Cordero Ribadeneyra’s administration (1984-1988), García and other transgender individuals were subjected to persecution by the infamous escuadrones volantes. According to her testimony, she was arrested by police and taken to barracks where they were forced to "do aberrant acts" for wearing clothes considered feminine.

During the 2007 Ecuadorian Constituent Assembly election, García ran as an alternate assemblywoman with the Social Constituent Front party. She was the first transgender person to be a candidate for a popularly elected position in Ecuador.

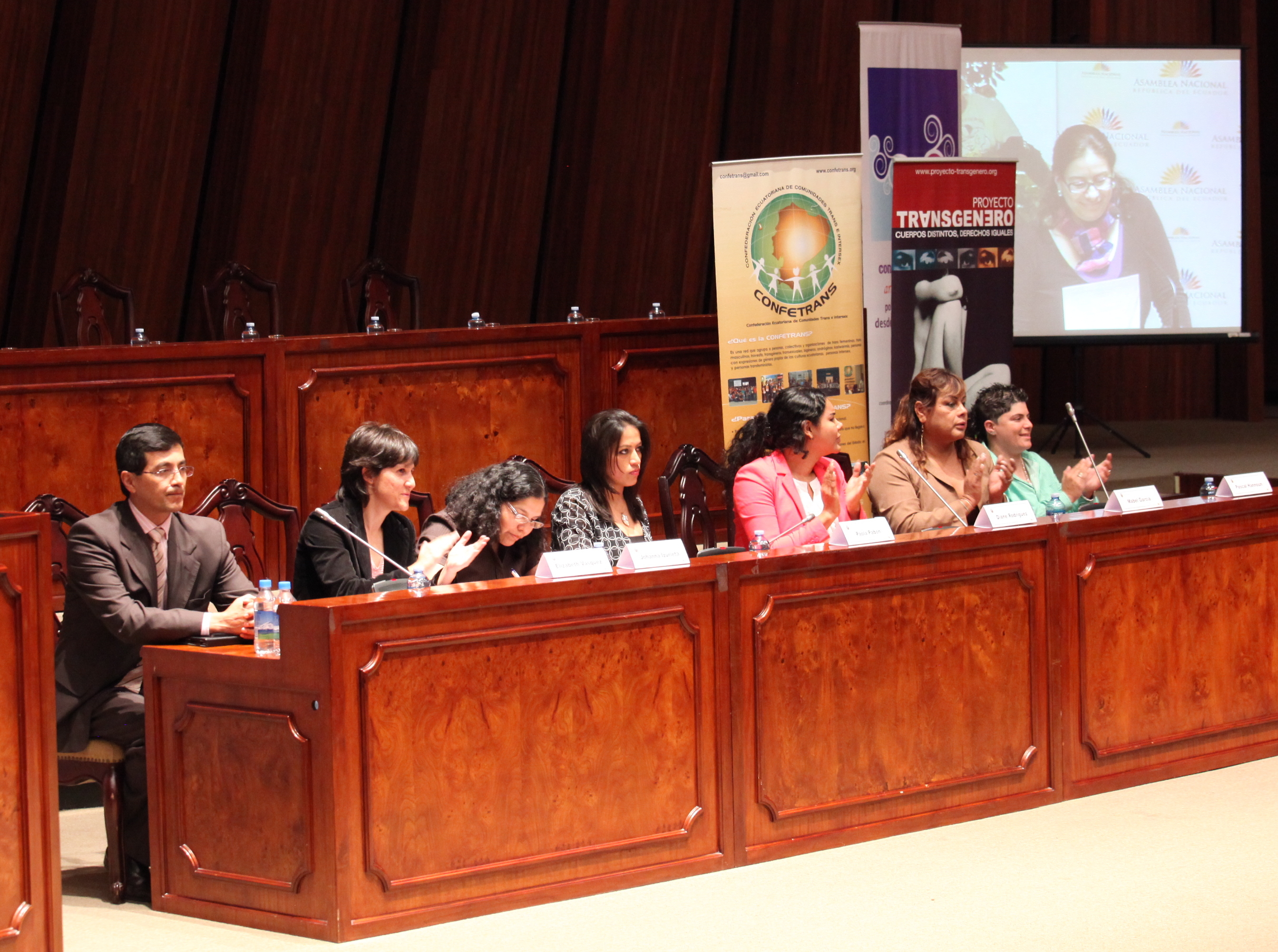
Mabell García in 2012 in the National Assembly of Ecuador.

In 2011, she obtained a law degree from Santa Elena Peninsula State University, becoming the first transgender law school graduate in Ecuador. Her thesis was entitled: "Legal rights of the transgender and transsexual population, and the sociocultural impact in the Salinas canton, province of Santa Elena, to ensure equality and equity before the law."

During the 2013 presidential elections, Garcia opposed candidate Nelson Zavala, due to his homophobic and transphobic proposals.
