= El Tiempo (Ecuador) =

Ecuadorian newspaper

El Tiempo is a newspaper published in Cuenca, Ecuador. It has been published since April 12, 1955.
