= Purita Pelayo =

Ecuadorian writer, LGBT activist (born 1957)

Purita Valentina Pelayo
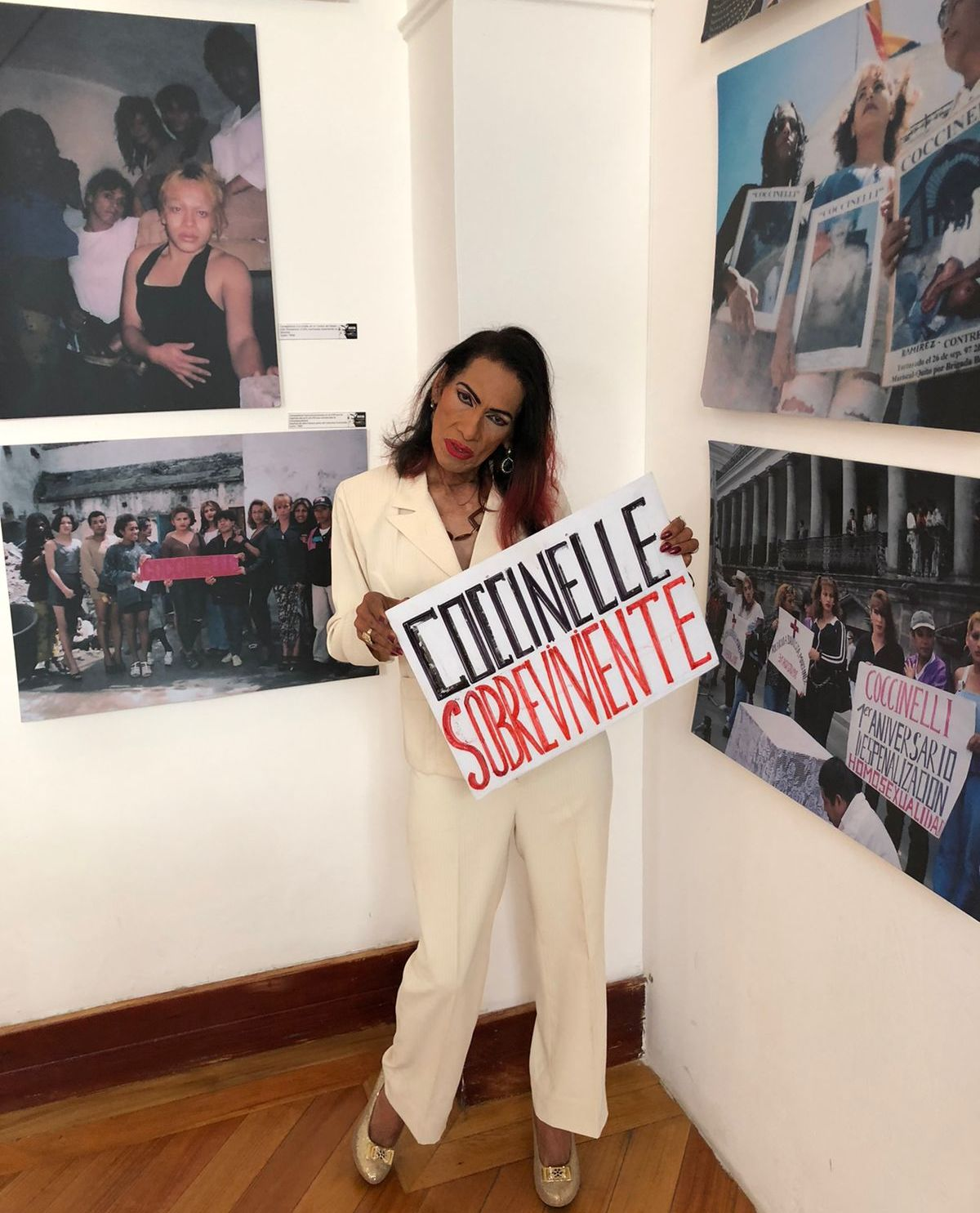
- Pelayo in 2021. Sign translates to "Coccinelle Survivor."
- Born: March 24, 1957 (age 69); Esmeraldas, Ecuador
- Other name: Alberto Cabral (pseudonym)
- Occupations: Writer, activist
- Known for: Helping to found the Coccinelle Association, LGBTQ activism, work to decriminalize homosexuality in Ecuador
- Notable work: Los fantasmas se cabrearon
- Awards: Patricio Brabomalo Award, 2021

Purita Valentina Pelayo (born March 24, 1957) is an Ecuadorian writer and activist for transgender rights. She played a leading role in the 1997 decriminalization of homosexuality in Ecuador. Pelayo was one of the founding members and the president of the Coccinelle Association, the first association of transgender, travesti, and intersex Ecuadorians.

To recognize Pelayo's activism for the rights of LGBTQ people, the Municipality of Quito granted her the Patricio Brabomalo Award in 2021. In 2017, she wrote Los fantasmas se cabrearon, a book about police violence against Ecuadorian LGBTQ people and the beginning of Ecuadorian LGBTQ activism in the 20th century. Pelayo wrote the book under her pseudonym, Alberto Cabral.

== Biography ==
Purita Pelayo was born on March 24, 1957 in Esmeraldas. She completed secondary school at Colegio 5 de Agosto in Esmeraldas. As a young woman, she participated in community service with the Comboni Missionaries of the Heart of Jesus. In the 1980s, she moved to Quito, intending to study law. After failing the law school entrance exam, Pelayo decided to study philosophy and political science at the Pontifical Catholic University of Ecuador. However, she dropped out after two and a half years. During this time, she began to present as a transgender and become close to other trans women in Quito's Mariscal District, many of whom were sex workers. Many of these women later became members of Coccinelle.

=== Activism with Coccinelle ===
In the late 20th century when Pelayo entered the world of activism, police frequently abused and arrested transgender women. In the nighttime, police officers beat and raped trans women and threw them into the lagoon in La Carolina Park in Quito. Owing to this, Pelayo decided to use the pseudonym Alberto Cabral to hide her true identity. She also used the name Maciel at the time. The idea for her pseudonym came from Alexis Ponce, the founder of the Permanent Assembly of Human Rights of Ecuador (ADPH), who suggested that Pelayo combine the names of the singers Alberto Cortez and Facundo Cabral, who were performing concerts in Ecuador at the time.

At first, Pelayo's activism centered on visiting the Provisional Detention Center in Guayaquil to help trans women who had been detained by police. She later began to join with other trans women to report the abuses against them. In the 1990s, many social groups in Ecuador, including Indigenous people, workers, and students, came together to advocate for their rights. Pelayo and her allies were motivated by this organizing. The group grew and decided to call itself the Coccinelle Association of Gays, Travestis, and Transgender People (Spanish: Asociación de Gays, Travestis y Transgéneros Coccinelle), in honor of Coccinelle, a French trans activist and entertainer. The association chose Pelayo as its first president and was legally recognized in 1997, making it the first trans organization in Ecuadorian history.

In response to the Bar Abanicos police raid, a violent police raid on a gay discotheque in Cuenca in June 1997, various Ecuadorian LGBTQ groups formed a front to demand the decriminalization of homosexuality. Pelayo took a prominent position in the campaign for gay rights, and members of Coccinelle began to gather every Wednesday in Quito's Plaza de la Independencia to demand their rights. On September 24, 1997, Pelayo and representatives of other LGBTQ groups appeared before the Constitutional Court of Ecuador to demand the decriminalization of homosexuality. The Court issued its opinion on November 25, 1997, declaring that first clause of Article 516 of the Penal Code was unconstitutional. This clause had previously made sodomy punishable by four to eight years in prison.

Coccinelle was dissolved in 2000 among conflicts over use of association funds. It was rebranded as the Ecuadorian Sexual Minorities Foundation (Spanish: Fundación Ecuatoriana de Minorías Sexuales, FEMIS), which kept Pelayo as president. FEMIS itself dissolved in 2006.

=== Later activism ===
Purita Pelayo wrote the book Los fantasmas se cabrearon under the pseudonym Alberto Cabral. It was published in November 2017 on the 20th anniversary of the decriminalization of homosexuality in Ecuador. She was inspired in part by The Men With the Pink Triangle by Heinz Heger, a nonfiction book which focuses on the persecution of gay men during the Holocaust. Los fantasmas se cabrearon focuses on police violence against trans women, the foundation of the Coccinelle Association, and the campaign for decriminalization in the late 20th century.

The publication of Los fantasmas se cabrearon allowed Pelayo to reconnect with many former members of Coccinelle. In 2019, Pelayo and other surviving members of Coccinelle united to form the group Nueva Coccinelle (New Coccinelle). On May 17, 2019, the International Day Against Homophobia, Biphobia and Transphobia, Nueva Coccinelle filed a lawsuit against the Ecuadorian state for police violence against transgender women in the 1980s and 1990s. The lawsuit seeks a formal apology and reparations. However, as of March 2022, the lawsuit has not progressed.

On June 24, 2021, Purita Pelayo was named the winner of the year's Patricio Brabomalo Award for her work in support of LGBTQ rights.

In March 2022, Pelayo reported that the owner of a bakery in central Quito hit her with a stick in a transphobic attack.

In 2024, Pelayo published a book of photographs titled Relámpagos debajo del puente (Lightning Under the Bridge) in which she gathered photos from a period of more than twenty years portraying herself and other trans Ecuadorian activists at distinct moments in the movement for decriminalization. The book was part of a project by the Ecuadorian Photographers Association. It received financial backing from the Municipality of Quitos' Secretary of Culture.

== Bibliography ==
- Ramos Ballesteros, Paulos (November 2019). Memorias Mecas. Archivo, imágenes y cuerpo en el vigésimo aniversario de la despenalización de la homosexualidad en Ecuador [Mecca Memories. File, Images, and Body on the Twentieth Anniversary of the Decriminalization of Homosexuality in Ecuador.] (PDF) (M.A. thesis) (in Spanish). Quito: Latin American Faculty of Social Sciences.
