= Hoy (Ecuadorian newspaper) =

Ecuadorian daily newspaper

- Siempre Joven (English: Forever Young)
- Type: Daily newspaper
- Format: Standard
- Language: Spanish
- City: Guayaquil
- Country: Ecuador

Hoy, a daily publication in Ecuador, was published physically from June 7, 1982, until August 26, 2014, and from then onwards digitally. Its editorial office is located in Quito, and it is currently published simultaneously in Guayaquil in electronic format. It was created by Jaime Mantilla Anderson, according to whom it was the first newspaper in the Americas to be published online.

Hoy was part of a group, whose other products included the MetroHOY, distributed in the public areas of the mass transport systems of Quito; MetroQuil, distributed in Guayaquil's Metrovia; The magazines Hoy Domingo (Sunday Today), Cometa (Comet), La Guía Inmobiliaria (Real Estate Guide) and the printing of Newsweek en Español (Newsweek in Spanish).
