= Permanent Assembly for Human Rights =

Argentine human rights organization

The Permanent Assembly for Human Rights (Spanish: La Asamblea Permanente por los Derechos Humanos, APDH) is an Argentine non-governmental human rights organization; founded in 1975. According to its official website the organization is the product of a "call from people coming from distinct areas: the church, politics, Human Rights, sciences, culture, and labour Argentines in response to the increasing violence and the collapse of the most elemental Human Rights in the country".

== History ==
The Permanent Assembly for Human Rights was founded on December 18, 1975, three months before the military coup that marked the beginning of the dictatorship known as the National Reorganization Process (1976–1983), in the House of Spiritual Exercises within the Church of Santa Cruz, as a result of an initiative of Rosa Pantaleón. Other founders included the Bishop of Neuquén, Jaime de Nevares; Rabbi Marshall Meyer; Bishop Carlos Gatinoni; Alicia Moreau de Justo; Raúl Alfonsín; Oscar Alende; Susana Pérez Gallart; Adolfo Pérez Esquivel and Alfredo Bravo.

The APDH played an important role in the defense of human rights during the military dictatorship. Later it supported the work of CONADEP fights against the impunity of the crimes against humanity committed during the National Reorganization Process.

== At present ==
Currently, the APDH works to consolidate democracy, defending the protection of life, human dignity, and social coexistence. In order to ensure the legal protection of human rights, the APDH participates in the following organizations:

- The United Nations (with Category II Consultative Status);
- UNESCO´s Memory of the World International Register: documentary heritage of the APDH;
- INADI National Institute Against Discrimination, Xenophobia, and Racism;
- OEA's Civil Society Organizations (OSC);
- Mercosur's Social Participation Support Unit;
- Public Entity for the Memory, the Promotion and Defence of Human Rights;
- Memoria Abierta (Open Memory, coordinator of the action of the Human Rights organisms;
- Social Forum of Argentina's Health and Environment

At the regional and continental scale, the APDH interacts in collective organizations in international networks such as the Global Council of Churches, the Continental Social Alliance, the Lawyers' American Association, The Global Social Forum and the Global Peace Council among other entities.

== How it works ==
The APDH follows current events in Argentina and analyzes them with regard to human rights. These tasks include:

• Denouncing human rights violations
• Negotiating before public authorities, institutions and entities specifically relevant to these rights
• Developing educational initiatives aimed at educating individuals about these rights
• Spreading National Constitution rulings : pacts, declarations, conventions, etc.
• Advising victims of human rights violations
• Working with brother organizations to ensure that human rights are respected
• Promoting the sanction of those laws necessary to ensure the protection of human rights

== Activities ==
The APDH is primarily made up of volunteers. Its headquarters are located in Buenos Aires and the organization has subsidiaries in other cities throughout Argentina.

Its principle tasks include:

- Watching over the prosecutions of crimes against humanity committed between 1976 and 1983;
- Keeping the memory of this period alive as a reminder of the necessity of civic action;
- Organizing documentation from and about the mechanisms of repression;
- Safeguarding the crimes against humanity's clarification;
- Collecting, studying and valuing the national reality information referring to Human Rights;
- Denouncing Human Rights' violations and providing advice to its victims;
- Collaborating with public authorities, institutions and entities watching over the full application of the rights;
- Developing educational actions in order to train legal subjects;
- Spreading regulatory documents: National Constitution, pacts, declarations, conventions, etc.;
- Working and cooperating altogether with fraternal entities struggling for Human Rights;
- Promoting the adaptation of necessary measures to ensure the Human Rights application.

== Funding ==
The APDH is a non-profit organization which funding is entirely based on donations and individual contributions. Nevertheless, for special projects and framework maintenance, the funding can originate in governmental or intergovernmental agencies.

Nowadays, the financial resources of the organization is composed of:

- 40% from the Buenos Aires legislature subsidies
- 35% from Contents
- 11% from the members' fees
- 9% from donations
- 5% from other incomes

== Authorities ==
- Presidents' Council: a body composed of volunteers from various sectors of the society: the church, politics, Human Rights, sciences, culture, and labour. They examine the annual report of the Board of Directors and set the Assembly’s agenda. They meet annually;
- Board of Directors: made up of members from the Presidents' Council. They determine what actions to take in order to fulfil the objectives set out by the Presidents' Council’s agenda. They meet monthly.
- Executive Committee: composed of the presidents, vice-presidents, secretaries of the Board of Directors, the treasurer, and the coordinating secretary. It carries out tasks established by the Board of Directors and keeps them updated on their progress, it suggests activities and work agendas. It meets weekly.
- Committees: specialized groups composed of specific commissions which carry out the Committee's aims. They gather information about the state of the nation, carry out studies, and produce reports and proposals of documents. They organize conferences, debates, seminars, and publications. The Committees are divided in distinct areas:

    - Environment and Housing
    - Documentary Archives
    - Legal Affairs
    - Economic, Social and Cultural Rights
    - Disability and Inclusion
    - Education
    - Investigation
    - Adults and their Rights
    - Women, Gender Equality and Diversity
    - Children and Teenagers
    - Peace and people's Free Will
    - Press
    - Native People
    - International Relations
    - Health
    - Mental Health
    - Security and Human Rights

Until december 2015, the three co-presidents of the APDH are Norma Ríos, Gisela Cardozo y Ernesto Moreau.

Some of the individuals that compose the APDH are: journalist Luisa Valmaggia, writer Ernesto Sábato and Noé Jitrik, religious leaders Monsignor Justo Laguna and Rabbi Daniel Goldman, painter Luis Felipe Noé, singer León Gieco, scientist Federico Westerkamp, lawyer Raúl Zaffaroni, and labor unionist Marta Maffei.

== Publications ==
The APDH has produced numerous publications (in Spanish) related to human rights. Amongst these are:

• National Security, a republican system of government and individual rights (Seguridad Nacional, sistema republicano de Gobierno y derechos individuales)
• The forced disappearance of Persons (La Desaparición forzada de Personas)
• The Disappearance as a crime against humanity (La desaparición como crimen de lesa humanidad)
• “Racism and violence” (about ethnic groups in history within scholarly texts) (Racismo y violencia (sobre la historia y las etnias en los textos escolares))
• The working woman and her rights (La mujer trabajadora y sus derechos)
• Domestic violence – Battered women (Violencia familiar-Mujer golpeada)
• Drug addicts, Victims or Culprits? (Drogadictos, ¿víctimas o culpables?)
• Life Workshops “Human Rights Education” (Talleres de Vida" Educación por los derechos humanos)
• Women’s human rights 50 years after the Universal Declaration (Los derechos humanos de la mujer a los 50 años de la Declaración Universal)
• Found guilty by society, unpunished by the law (Culpables para la sociedad, impunes por la ley)
• Women’s rights, are they human rights? (Los derechos de la mujer, son derechos humanos?)
• Estimates of the Dirty War (Las cifras de la guerra sucia)
• Reproductive rights are human rights (Los derechos reproductivos son derechos humanos)
• Economic issues and human rights (Orden económico y derechos humanos)
• Fundamentals of human rights (Fundamentos de los derechos humanos)

The following publications (in Spanish) can be viewed on-line:

- Memory and the Dictatorship (Memoria y Dictadura), 2006
- Discrimination: A didactic perspective from human rights (Discriminación: un abordaje didáctico desde los Derechos Humanos), 2006
- ¿Qué es esto de los Derechos Humanos? Apuntes para una reflexión crítica: historias, documentos, conceptos y actividades (Diciembre, 2012)
- Las conquistas de las Mujeres en los 30 años de Democracia (Abril, 2015)

== Delegations ==
- Buenos Aires: Azul, Balcarce, Conurbano sur, La Matanza (delegación autónoma), La Plata (delegación autónoma), Mar del Plata, Miramar, Olavarría, Punta Indio, Tres Arroyos, Villa Gesell, Zona Norte;
- Catamarca: Catamarca (ciudad);
- Chubut: Esquel, Noroeste de Chubut;
- Córdoba: Córdoba (city), Río Tercero, Villa María;
- Formosa: Formosa (city);
- Mendoza: Malargüe, San Rafael;
- Río Negro: Bariloche, El Bolsón, Viedma;
- San Luis: San Luis (city);
- San Juan: San Juan (city);
- Santa Fe: Rosario;
- Santiago del Estero: Santiago del Estero (city);
- Tierra del Fuego: Ushuaia;
- Tucumán: San Miguel de Tucumán (ciudad)
