= LGBTQ rights in Ecuador =

- Ecuador
- Legal status: Legal since 1997
- Gender identity: Transgender people allowed to change legal gender
- Military: Unknown
- Discrimination protections: Sexual orientation and gender identity constitutional protections

Family rights
- Recognition of relationships: Civil unions since 2008; Same-sex marriage since 2019
- Adoption: Single individuals and same-sex couples are explicitly banned from adopting children under codified law since 2026

Lesbian, gay, bisexual, transgender, and queer (LGBTQ) rights in Ecuador have evolved significantly in the past decades. Both male and female forms of same-sex sexual activity are legal in Ecuador and same-sex couples can enter into civil unions and same-sex marriages.

In 1998, Ecuador became one of the first countries in the world to constitutionally ban discrimination based on sexual orientation. Since 2008, civil unions with all of the rights of marriage (except for adoption) have been available to same-sex couples. Additionally, transgender people under the 2016 Gender Identity Law may change their legal gender solely based on self-determination, without undergoing surgery. Ecuador is also one of the few countries in the world to have banned conversion therapy. However, as of 2023, there are still hundreds of clinics that promote conversion therapy.

In 2013, gay activist Pamela Troya filed a lawsuit to strike down the country's same-sex marriage ban. The lawsuit focused mostly on the Inter-American Court of Human Rights' ruling in Atala Riffo and Daughters v. Chile and its 2018 opinion on same-sex marriage. The Atala case has caused bans on same-sex marriage in Mexico to be struck down and Chile pledging to legalise same-sex marriage. Additionally, in January 2018, the Inter-American Court of Human Rights ruled that same-sex marriage is a human right protected by the American Convention on Human Rights. As a result, on 12 June 2019, the Constitutional Court ruled in a 5–4 vote in favor of same-sex marriage, legalising it in Ecuador.

== History ==
Conquest by the Spanish from the mid-16th century onwards introduced Christianity, specifically Roman Catholicism, and religious mores condemning homosexuality as "sinful" and "immoral" to the region now known as Ecuador. As such, society has typically viewed homosexuality pejoratively. However, this is, or at least was, not the case for many of the indigenous peoples, including the Shuar. While the Europeans and the West have typically regarded anal intercourse as a sign of effeminacy, the Shuar perceived it as a sign of trickery. The "passive" partner (chiminiamnijikratin) and the "active" partner (chiminiamnijitiai) were not regarded as feminine. A Shuar myth, known as the story of the fox and the jaguar, involves the fox deceiving the jaguar into having anal sex, but after having discovered the trickery the jaguar chases the fox and bites him.

The Inca Empire's perception of homosexuality is unclear and is the subject of ongoing debate. Most modern-day documentation about the Incas stems from the Spanish Inquisition. These reports suggest that male homosexuality was punished in the south and centre of the Inca Empire, possibly by death, but was tolerated in the north. According to certain sources, homosexuality and cross-dressing were tolerated "acts of worship", commonly practised in religious rituals and temples. Quariwarmi were cross-dressing shamans, tasked with performing rituals in honour of Chuqui Hinchay, a jaguar dual-gender god. Effeminate men were called hualmishcu or warminchu by the Incas. Lesbian relationships seem to have been highly regarded by Inca society. Lesbians (known as holjoshta) enjoyed many privileges and could even participate in combats and were given the possibility of maintaining promiscuous relations between themselves.

== Law regarding same-sex sexual activity ==
Same-sex sexual activity has been legal in Ecuador since 1997 when the Constitutional Tribunal, in Case No. 111-97-TC, overturned the first paragraph of Article 516 of the Penal Code, which criminalized sexual activities between persons of the same sex. In 2014, a new Organic Integral Penal Code (2014) entered into force, which did not include the criminalising provisions previously overturned.

The age of consent in Ecuador is 14, regardless of gender or sexual orientation.

== Recognition of same-sex relationships ==
Article 67 of the Ecuadorian Constitution adopted in 2008 limited marriage to the union of a man and a woman. However, article 68 provides that same-sex couples in stable and monogamous unions shall enjoy the same rights and obligations as married couples, except for adoption.

The stable and monogamous union between two persons without any other marriage ties who have a common-law home, for the lapse of time and under the conditions and circumstances provided for by law, shall enjoy the same rights and obligations of those families bound by formal marriage ties.

(Note: In Spanish, the official version of Article 68 reads as follows: La unión estable y monogámica entre dos personas libres de vínculo matrimonial que formen un hogar de hecho, por el lapso y bajo las condiciones y circunstancias que señale la ley, generará los mismos derechos y obligaciones que tienen las familias constituidas mediante matrimonio. Article 68, Constitución de la República del Ecuador)

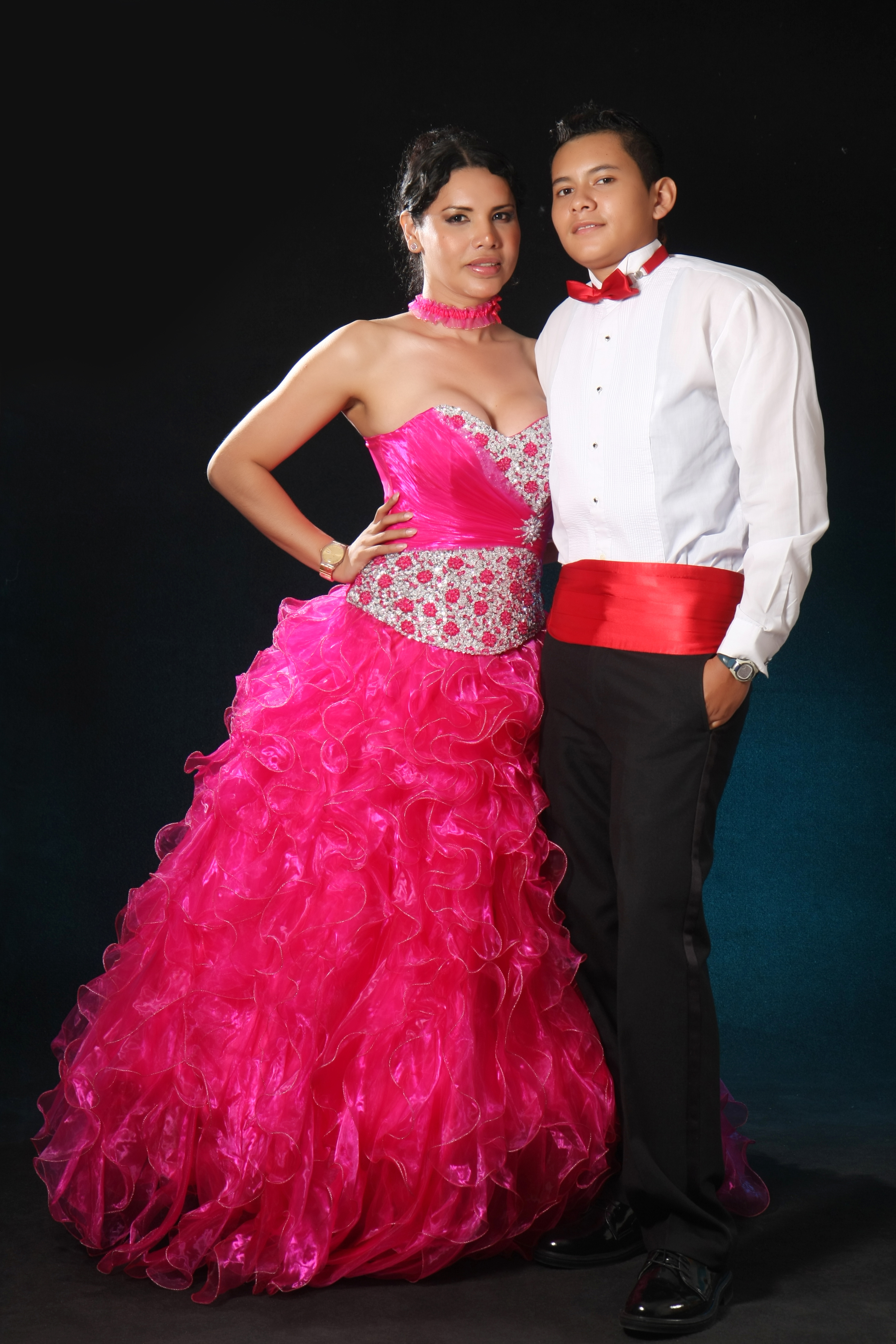
Diane Rodríquez and her partner Nicolás Guamanquispe (pictured) became one of the first couples to register a civil union in Ecuador.

Based on Article 68, civil unions for same-sex couples are legal in Ecuador. In August 2014, President Rafael Correa signed a resolution to allow same-sex couples to register their unions. It also allows civil unions to be registered as a complementary data to marital status and created a special registry for these unions. The order took effect on 15 September. In April 2015, the National Assembly approved an amendment to the Civil Code that codified civil unions into statutory law and deleted the requirement of evidence of cohabitation for at least two years.

=== 2018 Inter-American Court of Human Rights advisory opinion ===
On 9 January 2018, the Inter-American Court of Human Rights (IACHR) issued an advisory opinion that parties to the American Convention on Human Rights should grant same-sex couples "accession to all existing domestic legal systems of family registration, including marriage, along with all rights that derive from marriage".

Following the IACHR advisory opinion, which held that same-sex marriage is a human right, two same-sex couples went to the Civil Registry in Cuenca, applying for marriage licenses. After both were rejected for not being a different-sex couple, they filed suit in court arguing that the refusal to recognise their marriage was discriminatory, unconstitutional and a violation of the American Convention on Human Rights. Relying on the IACHR advisory opinion, two family judges ruled in the couples' favour on 29 June 2018. The judges ordered the Civil Registry to immediately begin registering same-sex marriages. However, the Civil Registry appealed the decision to the Constitutional Court. On 12 June 2019, the court ruled in favor of same-sex marriage, making it legal throughout the country.

== Adoption and parenting ==
Article 68 of the Ecuador Constitution states: "La adopción corresponderá sólo a parejas de distinto sexo". An unofficial English language translation of this provision states: "Adoption shall only be permitted for different-sex couples." The Constitution is silent about adoptions by single individuals.

Under Ecuadorian statutory law, however, a single person is allowed to adopt a child, although a legally constituted heterosexual couple has priority over the single person.

In May 2018, the Constitutional Court of Ecuador ordered the Civil Registry to register a seven-year-old girl as the daughter of a lesbian couple. The case, filed in September 2012, sought to have the daughter registered with the surnames of both her mothers. The Court ruled that failing to register the daughter is a violation of children's rights. The vote was 5 to 3, with one abstention.

On 14 August 2026, new adoption legislation went into effect explicitly prohibiting single and same-sex couples adopting children - by a 118-0 vote within the legislative body.

== Discrimination protections ==
In 1998, Ecuador became the first country in the Americas (and only the third worldwide after South Africa and Fiji) to include sexual orientation as a protected category in its Constitution. An unofficial English language translation of Article 11(2) states:

All persons are equal and shall enjoy the same rights, duties and opportunities. No one shall be discriminated against for reasons of ethnic belonging, place of birth, age, sex, gender identity, cultural identity, civil status, language, religion, ideology, political affiliation, legal record, socio-economic condition, migratory status, sexual orientation, health status, HIV carrier, disability, physical difference or any other distinguishing feature, whether personal or collective, temporary or permanent, which might be aimed at or result in the diminishment or annulment of recognition, enjoyment or exercise of rights. All forms of discrimination are punishable by law. The State shall adopt affirmative action measures that promote real equality for the benefit of the rights-bearers who are in a situation of inequality.

In 2015, a labor law reform made it illegal for employers to discriminate against people due to their sexual orientation.

In June 2018, the Justice Ministry approved a new policy concerning the rights of LGBT people. The policy aims to guarantee and strengthen their rights in relation to health, education, work, security, social protection and justice.

== Gender identity and expression ==
The Gender Identity Law (Spanish: Ley Orgánica de Gestión de la Identidad y Datos Civiles), approved in 2016, allows Ecuadorians to state their gender identity instead of the sex assigned at birth. The law distributes new legal ID cards to those wishing to change their gender and birth name.

== Conversion therapy ==
In November 2011, an Ecuadorean activist group, called Fundación Causana, began a petition on Change.org to entreat the Ecuadorean Minister of Health to close down more than 200 "ex-gay clinics". The group claimed that the clinics abuse and torture patients in an effort to "cure homosexuality".

The clinics primarily targeted lesbians and operated under the guise of being drug rehabilitation centers. At least one pair of parents discovered the abuse and asked for the clinic to release their daughter, Paola Ziritti, but were denied. Ziritti was eventually released after two years of confinement and was the first to press a formal complaint against the clinics.

Activists consequently called on the Government to close down the clinics, but by August 2011, only 27 had been closed, while a reported 207 clinics remained open. On 23 January 2012, the Change.org petition was closed and marked as a success with 113,761 international signatures. The petition also was updated with a statement from Fundacion Causana reading,

After ten years of outcry, the nation of Ecuador – through the Ministry of Public Health – has entered into a commitment with civic organizations and society in general to deconstruct the belief that homosexuality is an illness and root out the use of torture in these clinics. We extend our thanks to all the men and women who signed our petition. It has been invaluable to have this support in starting to change this reality.

Minister of Health Carina Vance Mafla ordered shortly thereafter three clinics to be raided in the vicinity of Quito and rescued dozens of women.

Consequently, Article 151 of the Penal Code was changed in 2014 to prohibit conversion therapy, equating it to torture. People who undertake the pseudoscientific practice are punished with seven to ten years' imprisonment.

== Living conditions ==
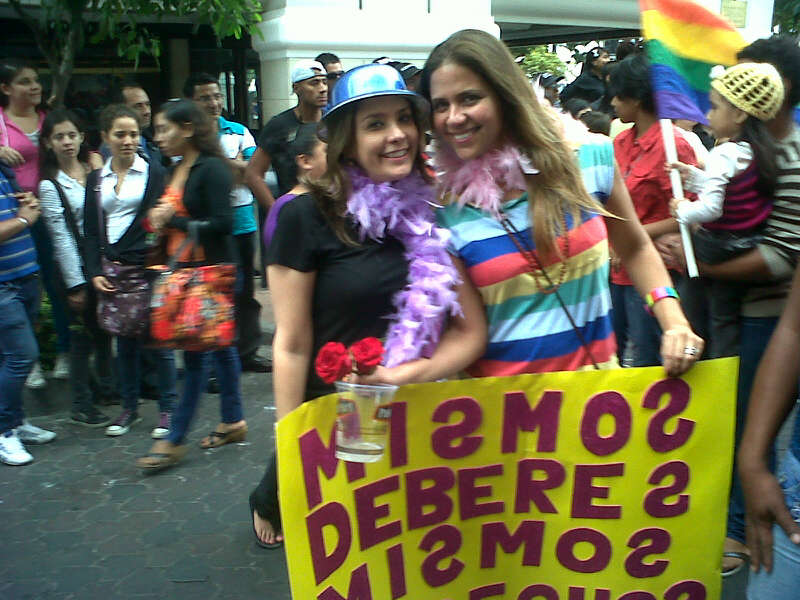
LGBTI Pride parade in Guayaquil (2013)

A fairly large gay scene has developed in Quito and Guayaquil. The first gay pride in Ecuador took place in Quito in 1998, following the Constitutional Court ruling that overturned the law which prohibited sexual acts between people of the same sex. Nevertheless, Ecuador has a conservative and macho culture, and homosexuality tends to be viewed negatively by society.

Since the last decade, many gay pride marches have been organized in all major cities, with the authorization of authorities and police protection, in addition to their participation. In Guayaquil's gay pride march of 2011, for instance, among those present were Guayas Province's Vice Prefect Luzmila Nicolaide, Guayaquil City Council member Gino Molinari, and member of the National Assembly Gina Godoy, while the police band played traditional songs.

There have also been LGBT film festivals organized in the major cities.

The U.S. Department of State's 2011 Human Rights Report found that,

The constitution includes the principle of nondiscrimination and establishes choice of sexual orientation as a right. Although the law prohibits discrimination based on sexual orientation, gay, lesbian, and transgender persons continued to suffer discrimination from both public and private bodies. LGBT organizations reported that transgender persons suffered more discrimination because they were more visible. LGBT groups claimed that police and prosecutors did not thoroughly investigate deaths of LGBT individuals, including when there was suspicion that the killing was because of sexual orientation or gender identity. LGBT organizations and credible media sources reported that LGBT persons were interned against their will in private treatment centers to "cure" or "dehomosexualize" them, although such treatment is illegal. The clinics reportedly used cruel treatments, including rape, in an attempt to change LGBT persons' sexual orientation. In August[,] the government reported that it closed 30 such centers, but LGBT organizations reported that other illegal clinics continued to operate. Members of the LGBT community continued to report that their right of equal access to formal education was frequently violated. The LGBT population involved in the commercial sex trade reported abusive situations, extortion, and mistreatment by security forces.

In 2012, President Rafael Correa appointed Carina Vance Mafla, a lesbian activist, as the country's Health Minister.

In 2017, approximately 20,000 people marched in the Guayaquil Gay Pride parade. For the first time, the municipality of Guayaquil agreed to light up the Bolivar and San Martin Monument with the colors of the rainbow in support of LGBT rights. In June 2017, the Presidential House was illuminated in rainbow colors. In 2018, more than 18,000 people participated in the Quito Pride march.

=== 2013 election homophobic remarks ===
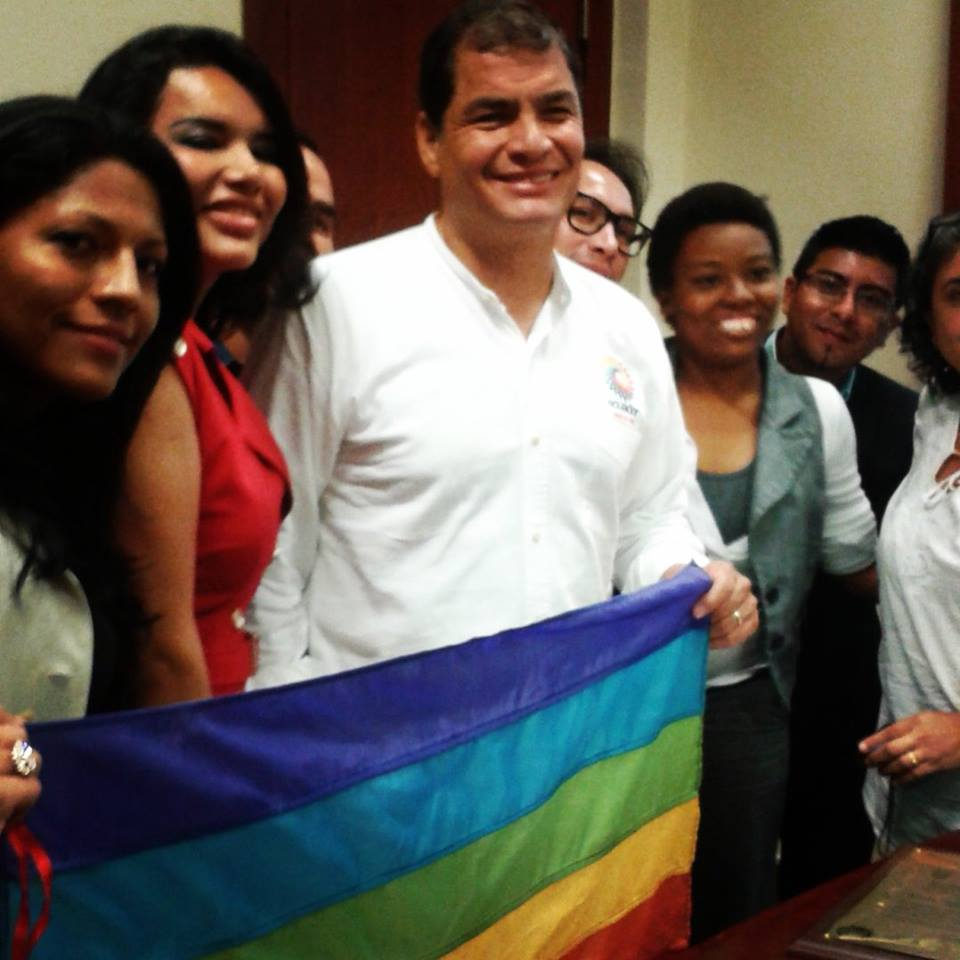
Historic meeting with President Rafael Correa of Ecuador, led by Diane Rodríguez

After the 2013 Ecuadorian general election, Nelson Zavala, an evangelical preacher and the presidential candidate who finished last out of the eight candidates, was sentenced by an election court to pay more than $3,000 in fines for his homophobic remarks. The court also prohibited him for a year from standing as a candidate or from affiliating himself or being involved with a political party or movement. During the campaign, he called gay people "sinners" and "immoral" and said they suffered from "severe deviation of conduct." LGBT activists applauded the ruling as "landmark". Zavala appealed the verdict, but the ruling was ratified in the last instance on 19 March 2013.

=== LGBTI candidacy ===
In the 2013 elections, LGBTI activist Diane Marie Rodríguez Zambrano of the Silueta X Association (Asociación Silueta X) became the first openly transgender candidate to run for public office. At the conclusion of her candidacy, Ecuadorian President Rafael Correa Delgado declared his respect and admiration for Rodriquez on Twitter. Months later, Rodriguez was invited to change the Presidential Guard. In December 2013, she led the first LGBTI group meeting with President Rafael Correa. The meeting concluded with several agreements. In 2017, she was elected to the National Assembly, becoming the country's first transgender lawmaker.

== Summary table ==
Same-sex sexual activity legal	Yes (Since 1997)
Equal age of consent (14)	Yes (Since 1997)
Anti-discrimination laws in employment only	Yes (Since 1998)
Anti-discrimination laws in the provision of goods and services	Yes (Since 1998)
Anti-discrimination laws in all other areas (incl. indirect discrimination, hate speech)	Yes (Since 1998)
Same-sex marriages	Yes (Since 2019)
Recognition of same-sex couples	Yes (Since 2008)
Adoption for single people regardless of sexual orientation	Yes
Stepchild adoption by same-sex couples	No
Joint adoption by same-sex couples	No (Constitutional ban since 2008; Codified in 2026)
LGBT people allowed to serve openly in the military	Yes (Since 2009)
Right to change legal gender	Yes
Gender identity recognition in identity cards	Yes (Since 2016)
Automatic parenthood for both spouses after birth	Yes (Since 2018)
Access to IVF for lesbians	
Conversion therapy banned	Yes (Since 2014)
Commercial surrogacy for gay male couples	
MSMs allowed to donate blood	Yes

== See also ==
- Case No. 111-97-TC
- LGBT rights in the Americas
- Same-sex marriage in Ecuador
- Same-sex unions in Ecuador
- Decriminalization of homosexuality in Ecuador
- Bar Abanicos police raid
- LGBT literature in Ecuador
- The Man Who Was Kicked to Death
- Timeline of LGBT history in Ecuador
