= Case No. 111-97-TC =

1997 decision by the Constitutional Tribunal of Ecuador

Case No. 111-97-TC is a landmark decision by the Constitutional Tribunal of Ecuador on November 25, 1997, regarding the country's sodomy laws. The newly created tribunal unanimously overturned as unconstitutional the first paragraph of Article 516 of the Penal Code, which criminalized sexual activities between persons of the same sex. The case was the first step towards increasing recognition of LGBT rights in Ecuador. The following year, Ecuador became the first country in the Americas (and only the third in the world after South Africa and Fiji) to include sexual orientation as a protected category in its constitution.

The tribunal's decision was not wholeheartedly received by LGBT rights activists, who criticized its characterization of homosexuality as "abnormal conduct" that should be treated medically rather than penally sanctioned. The tribunal was accused of being traditional-minded for stating that "it is clear that even though homosexuality should not be a judicially punishable conduct, the protection of the family and of minors requires that it not be a socially exalted conduct".

The decision was also criticized by social conservatives opposed to the decriminalization of homosexuality altogether.

== See also ==
- National Coalition for Gay and Lesbian Equality and Another v. Minister of Justice and Others (1998), a similar case decided by the South African Constitutional Court.
- Lawrence v. Texas (2003), a similar case decided by the United States Supreme Court.
- Recognition of same-sex unions in Ecuador, (2009), Civil unions for same-sex couples were legalized by the approval of the 2008 Constitution of Ecuador.
- Legal Precedent (2009), Right to change legal names female to male and vice versa for people transgender and intersex by the approval of the 2008 Constitution of Ecuador.
- LGBT rights in Ecuador
