= Fundación Ecuatoriana Equidad =

LGBTQ non-profit organization in Ecuador

Fundación Ecuatoriana Equidad was created on October 10, 2000. It is not a federal government program but is a non-profit organization. The organization maintains two main goals. One goal of the organization is to achieve social and political rights for gays, lesbians, bisexuals, transgender people, and people who identify as intersexual. Another goal for the organization is sexual health advocacy. The foundation was started because homosexuals were incarcerated due to a criminalization of sexual activity between people of the same sex by the government.

== Research ==
Fundación Ecuatoriana Equidad organized local volunteers to participate in the iPrEx study, which was a clinical trial testing the efficacy of a drug used as a pre-exposure prophylaxis against HIV infection.

== Context ==
Prior to current laws and regulations, Ecuadorians could be arrested for any public displays that went against their common moral value. Men were publicly and brutally attacked for being at gay bars or for interacting with the gay community. These actions were justified under the court of law, until constitutional reform in 1998. On August 10, 1998, the Constitution of Ecuador underwent reformation in order to recognize equality based within the law, regardless of age, sex, ethnic origin, color, religion, political affiliation, economic position, sexual orientation, state of health, or any other difference. Within the South American countries, this is considered to be the most liberal, as well as the most enlightened. Since 2008, civil unions with all of the rights of marriage (except for adoption) have been available to same-sex couples.

In Quito and Guayaquil, liberalism has become more prevalent as conservatism adjusts to the law.

== Partners ==
Fundación Ecuatoriana Equidad receives support from Hivos, a Dutch organization which promotes HIV education and gay rights.

== Legal rights in Ecuador ==
Currently in Ecuador, both male and female same-sex sexual activity is legal, but same-sex couples and households headed by same-sex couples are not eligible for all of the same legal protection available to opposite- sex married couples. In 1998, Ecuador became one of the first countries worldwide to ban discrimination based on sexual orientation. Since 2008, civil unions with all of the rights of marriage (except for adoption) have been available to same-sex couples. The original constitution permitted marriage only between man and woman: however, same-sex activity has been legal in Ecuador since 1997.

== Mission ==
The mission is to promote sexual health and reduce prejudice and acts of discrimination based on sexual preferences sex identity, or HIV/AIDS, through communication, prevention, sensibility, empowerment and citizen participation in society. Those efforts will aid in making a better quality of life for the GLBTI community and people who have HIV and AIDS. The organization offers help with medical problems, help with getting HIV tested, psychological services, help getting legal aid for people in the GLBTI community and a community space for members.

== Magazine ==
The foundation created the annual magazine called GLBTI nùmero 12, discontinued in 2014. This magazine was meant to reflect the principle necessities that the GLBTI community faced in the country. The magazine talked about the representation of the GLBTI.
