= Constitutional Court of Ecuador =

The Constitutional Court of Ecuador (Spanish: Corte Constitucional del Ecuador), previously the Constitutional Tribunal of Ecuador (Tribunal Constitucional del Ecuador), is the constitutional court of Ecuador.

== History ==
The Court was created as part of Ecuador's 1996 constitutional reform package. It is composed of nine magistrates.

The Court has been affected by Ecuador's recent political crises. In 2005, President Lucio Gutiérrez manipulated his party's modest advantage in Congress to replace numerous justices, including eight of nine members of the Court .

In 2007, the Court was involved in a confrontation with newly elected President Rafael Correa. On March 9, the Court warned Correa that he would be acting illegally if he ignored its eventual ruling on the constitutionality of a national referendum. Correa responded that the Tribunal was "dominated by the political parties" and that it had no authority to act on the issue. The Court's rulings have often been ignored by Ecuador's presidents and Congress.

== Notable decisions ==
In the 1997 case 111-97-TC, the Court decriminalized homosexuality in Ecuador. In the 2019 case 11-18-CN/19, the Court legalized same-sex marriage in Ecuador.

On May 29, 2018, the court ruled in case 1692-12-EP in favor of a lesbian couple, allowing them to register their child in the Civil Registry with both their surnames.

On February 5, 2024, in the case 67-23-IN/24, the court ruled that active euthanasia is legal.
