= Pride celebrations in Ecuador =

Annual LGBT events in Ecuador

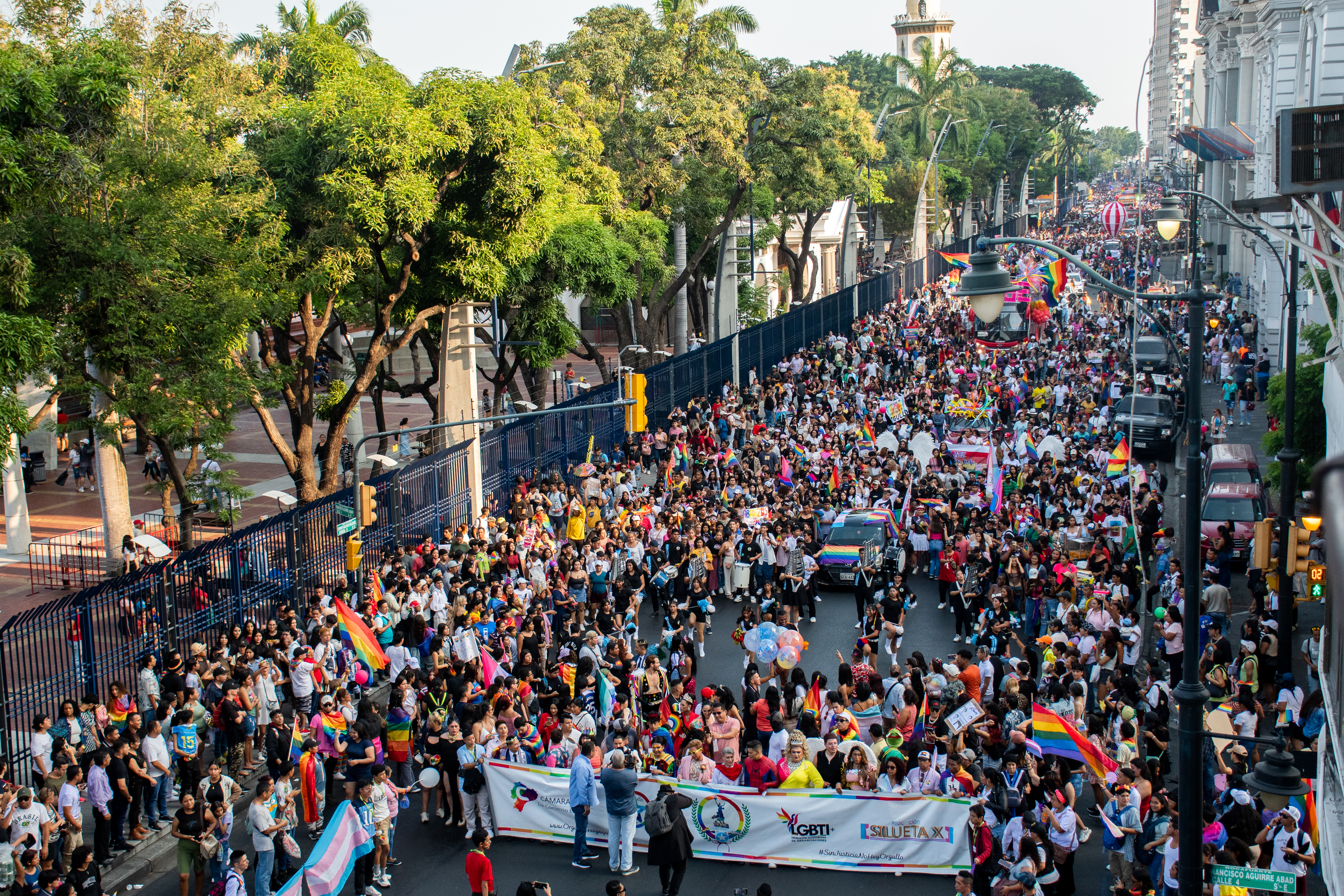
Attendees of the 2024 Guayaquil LGBT Pride March passing along the Malecón Avenue.

LGBT pride in Ecuador is celebrated annually in various cities across the country with a series of events, festivals, and marches that seek to vindicate sexual diversity, the rights of LGBT people, and their respect as human beings. These celebrations, which mostly take place during the month of June, usually unfold in a festive atmosphere where participants attend wearing colorful clothing, masks, and rainbow flags. The presence of floats is also common as part of the marches.

The events in honor of LGBT pride have their origin in the Stonewall riots, a confrontation between police and activists from the sexual diversity community that occurred on June 28, 1969, in New York (United States) and marked a milestone in the struggle for LGBT rights internationally. In Ecuador, the first pride march took place on June 28, 1998, in the city of Quito and brought together about twenty people who started from El Arbolito Park and traveled through several streets and avenues of the capital.

During the first years of the 21st century, pride celebrations spread to cities such as Guayaquil, Manta, and Loja. In the following decades, pride marches began to be held annually in more than a dozen Ecuadorian cities, including, in addition to those already mentioned, localities such as Ambato, Cuenca, Portoviejo, Santo Domingo, Durán, and Babahoyo. These manifestations gather from hundreds of people to tens of thousands of attendees, as is the case of the marches in Quito and Guayaquil.

== Pride marches ==
Cities in Ecuador where pride marches have been held.

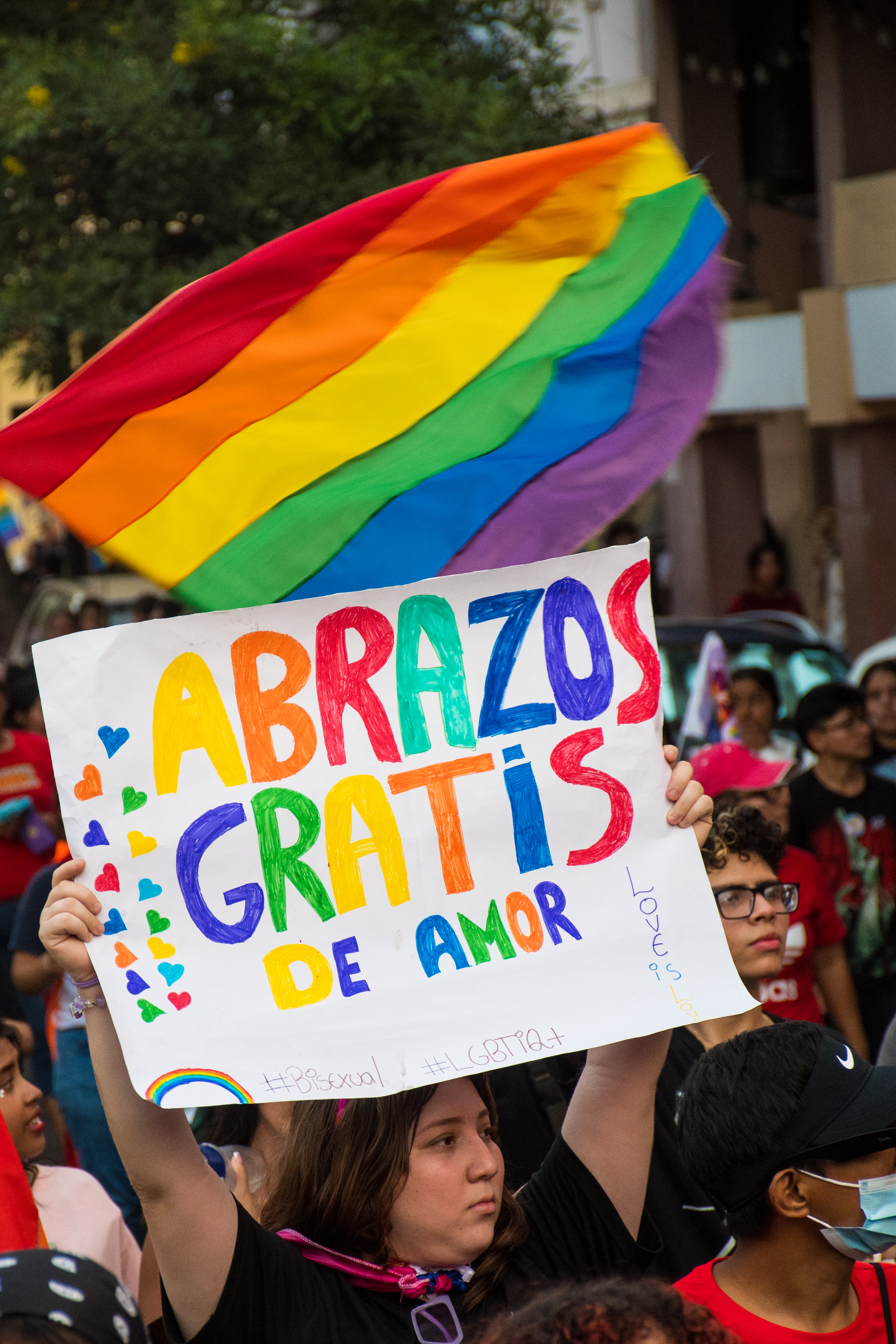
Activist during an LGBT Pride event in Guayaquil, 2024.

City	First edition	Peak attendance
Quito	1998	25,000
Guayaquil	2008	45,000
Manta	2008	
Machala	c. 2008	
Loja	2010	300
Santo Domingo	2011	
Portoviejo	2013	300
Cuenca	2014	5000
Ambato	c. 2015	
Quevedo	2016	
Durán	2018	
Babahoyo	2018	400
Zamora	2018	
Riobamba	2021	
Santa Elena	2022	

=== Quito ===
The first Quito LGBT Pride March took place on June 28, 1998, and was also the first ever held in Ecuador. After this first edition, it was organized again in 2001 and has since become an annual event. Over the years, the number of participants progressively increased to reach around 25,000, as happened in 2022. The march has had the support and attendance of various local authorities, including the mayor of the city and the provincial prefect.

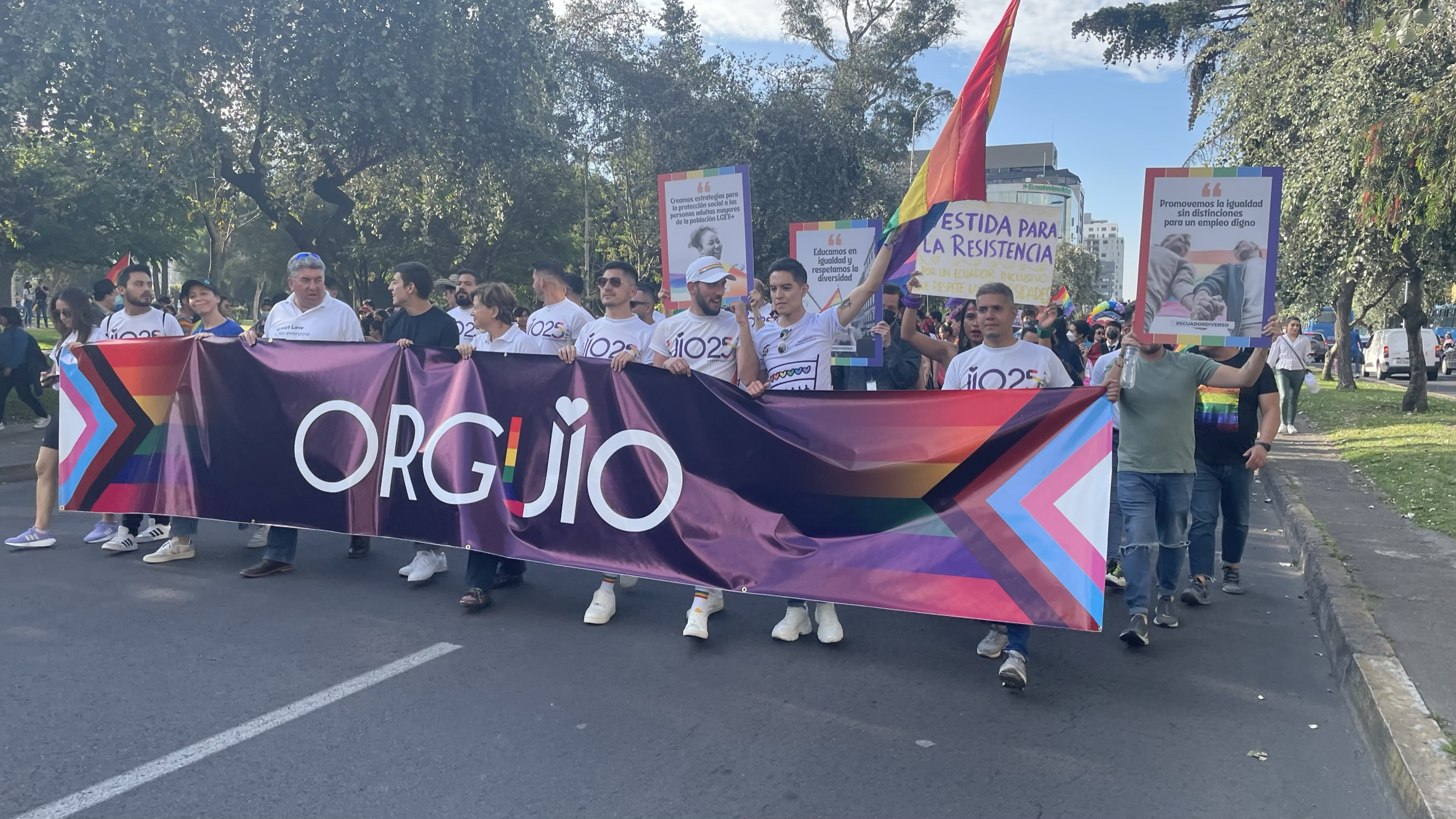
2022 edition of the Quito LGBT Pride March.

The first editions had the participation of several hundred people and took place in the historic center of Quito, under the organization of groups such as Fedaeps and the National GLBT Network. They usually ended at sites like the Plaza del Teatro and Plaza de Santo Domingo. In 2008, the march moved its route to the La Mariscal sector in the north of the city and was organized by the Fundación Equidad. The route that year started at the premises of the Ministry of Culture and Heritage and ended at Plaza Foch, with the attendance of personalities such as the vice-mayor of the city, Margarita Carranco.

In later years, the march repeatedly changed its route and continued to grow in attendance. Until 2016, it took place in the La Mariscal sector, but in 2017 and 2018 it returned to the historic center, with around 10,000 people participating in the latter edition. In 2019, it took place in the vicinity of La Carolina Park, while in 2020 and 2021 it was canceled due to the COVID-19 pandemic. The following year, it returned to La Carolina.

The 2023 edition stood out for having the attendance of Pabel Muñoz, mayor of the city, and Paola Pabón, provincial prefect.

=== Guayaquil ===
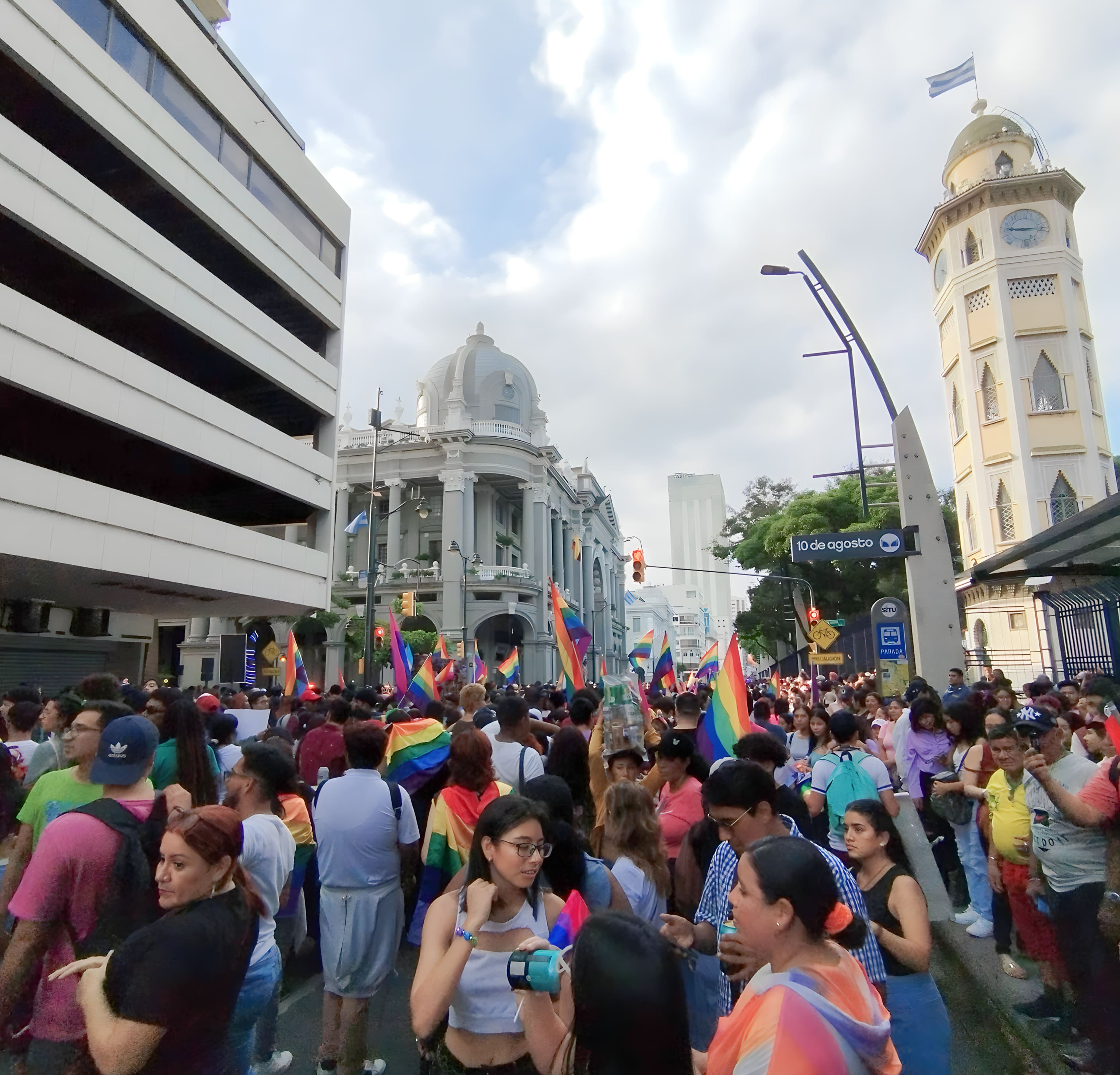
2023 edition of the Guayaquil LGBT Pride March.

The Guayaquil LGBT Pride March has been held annually in the city since 2008. The traditional route of the event starts at Olmedo Avenue, then travels along part of Malecón Simón Bolívar and Nueve de Octubre Avenues, culminating at Parque Centenario, on a route approximately two and a half kilometers long. March attendance has grown steadily and, today, it is considered one of the most crowded annual parades in the city, with the 2023 edition reaching nearly 40,000 people. Among the public figures who have attended are authorities such as the prefect of Guayas Province, national assembly members, and city councilors.

The history of the march dates back to June 28, 2000, when activists from the foundation Famivida attempted to organize a pride march for the first time in the city but were dispersed by a group of police officers who threw tear gas to dissolve the event. In the following years, activists requested permission from the mayor to hold the march but received repeated negative responses. The first march was finally held in 2008, as part of the Arte y Diversidad Festival, and traveled along Delta Avenue. The following year, it moved to the city center and had the support of the national government. Since 2014, the municipality began granting permits for the march, whereas in previous editions only authorization from the Police Intendency had been received.

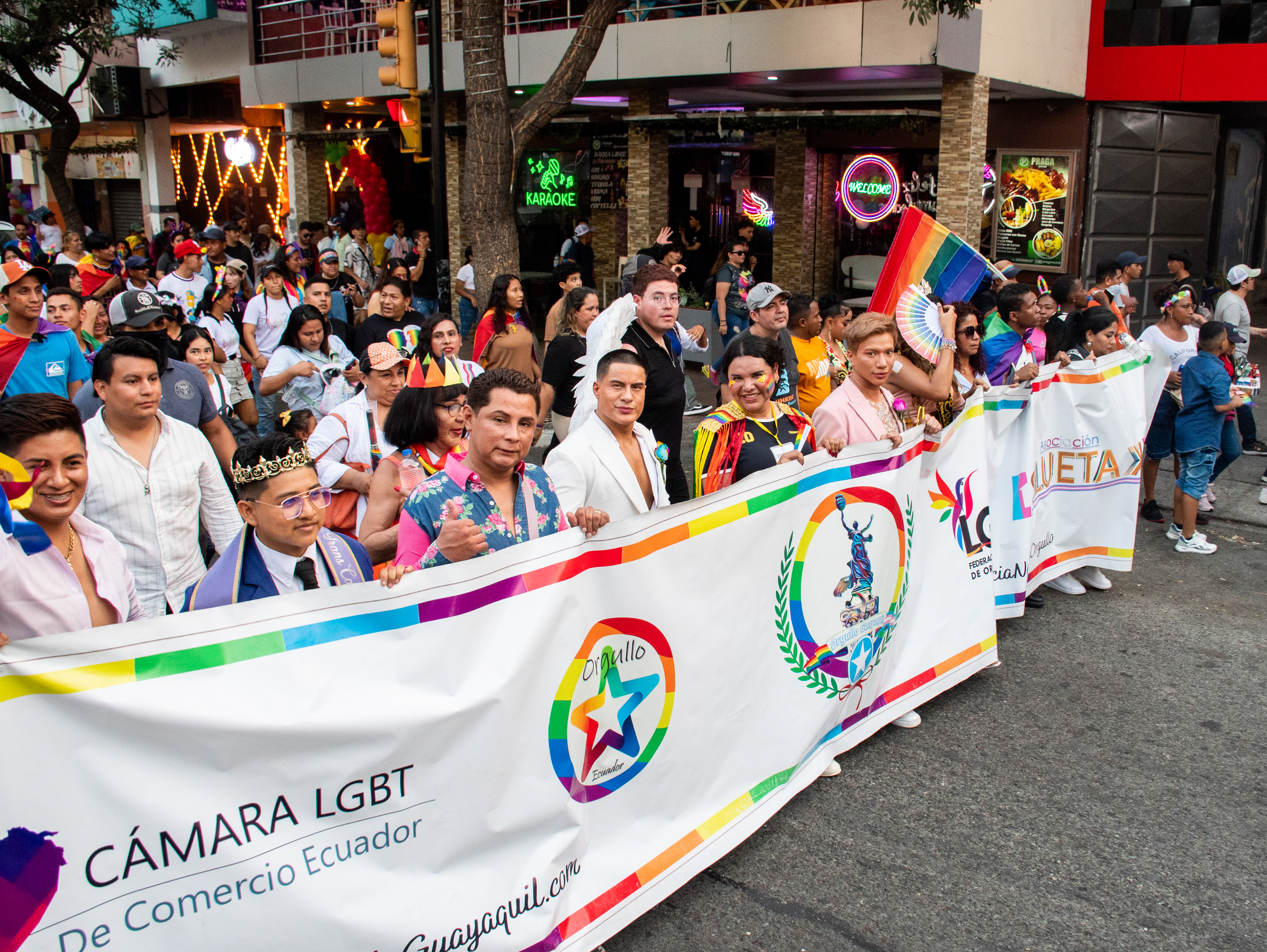
2024 LGBT Pride March.

In later years, the march came to be organized by a committee made up of several pro-LGBT rights groups, including organizations such as Silueta X Association, Colectivo GLBTI Milagro, Asociación Transmasculinos del Ecuador, Colectivo GLBTI Nobol, and Colectiva Transfeminista.

The 2023 edition faced complications when the city municipality denied permits for the march to take place on its traditional route, arguing that the event would generate vehicular traffic. LGBT organizations rejected this suggestion and stated that it was an attempt to displace LGBT people from the city center. Faced with the municipality's refusal to reconsider the decision, legal protection actions were filed against it, which were resolved in favor of the march organizers, so it proceeded without incident along the usual downtown route.

=== Cuenca ===
In Cuenca, the LGBT pride march takes place in June each year since 2014 and is held in the city's historic center. Attendance reaches several thousand people each edition, with approximately 5,000 attendees in 2023. In addition to the common activities held at other similar marches, the traditional burning of the vaca loca (a firework structure) is a unique feature of the Cuenca march.

Before the first pride march, LGBT activists in Cuenca celebrated International LGBT Pride Day with advocacy events such as protests, musical performances, and high-heel races, organized by groups like Verde Equilibrante and the Silueta X Association. The first edition took place on June 23, 2014, following the first debate approval of the Ordinance for Inclusion, Recognition, and Respect of Sexual and Sex-Generic Diversity in Cuenca, initiated by activists Vanessa Morocho and Yesenia Castro. Although the municipality initially raised objections to the event, it finally approved a route that crossed Bolívar and Presidente Borrero streets and culminated at Puente Roto.

In the following years, the Azuay LGBTI Network participated in organizing the march, which changed its route on several occasions. For example, in 2015, it started at Paseo 3 de Noviembre and ended at the Puente Roto sector, while the 2022 march started at San Blas Park and again ended at Puente Roto. In 2024, the route reached San Francisco Plaza.

=== Other cities ===
The city of Manta is one of the Ecuadorian localities that holds annual pride marches. The first edition, held on June 25, 2008, was organized by the Unidos Somos Más foundation, with the support of the city municipality, and brought together hundreds of participants, also featuring delegations from Manabí cantons and towns such as Santa Ana, 24 de Mayo, Portoviejo, Jaramijó, and Picoazá. In 2013, the march took place on July 10 and was organized by the Luvid foundation, with actress Doménica Menessini present as godmother. The route began on section II of the Circunvalación highway and continued through several streets and avenues in the city center, ending at the Civic Plaza. In the following years, the march continued to be organized by Luvid and followed similar routes.

Machala has held an annual pride march at least since 2008. The route starts at Ismael Pérez Pazmiño Park and travels along 25 de Junio Avenue, then ends at a location where an artistic performance takes place, such as Parque de los Héroes or the building of the El Oro prefecture. It features the participation of the Technical University of Machala and organizations such as Sembrando Futuro and Caminos Verdes.

In Portoviejo, its first pride march was held in 2013 and was organized by the Fundación Equidad. It started at the intersection of Manabí Avenue and Quito Street and ended at the Reales Tamarindos Airport area, where a stage was set up for a performance. After this first edition, it was not held for several years until it was organized again in 2022, when it achieved an attendance of around 300 people, and has since become an annual event.

In Ambato, the pride march has been held at least since 2015. In 2016, the activities in honor of LGBT Pride in the city had the support of political authorities such as assembly member Betty Carrillo and governor Lira Villalva. The march's route has varied by edition; for example, in 2023, it started at the intersection of Pichincha and Quiz Quiz avenues and ended at Parque de las Flores; while in 2024 it started from Parque La Laguna, then proceeded along Bolívar and Castillo streets and ended outside the City Library.

Other Ecuadorian localities where pride marches have been held include the cities of Riobamba, Ibarra, Quevedo, Jaramijó, Zamora, Babahoyo, Pasaje, Santa Rosa, La Concordia, General Villamil, Santo Domingo, Santa Elena, La Libertad, and Durán.

=== Trans March ===
The Ecuador National Trans March is held annually in several cities of Ecuador since 2020. The march is held in November every year to commemorate the Transgender Day of Remembrance, celebrated annually on 20 November, and the anniversary of the decriminalization of homosexuality in the country, which took place on 27 November 1997.

== Pride festivals ==
=== Quito ===
In addition to the march, an annual pride festival takes place in Quito featuring musical, dance, and theatrical performances that serve as a recreational space for LGBT people, particularly for young people. The city's first pride festival took place in 2000 at Plaza Foch. The event, which in its early years was organized by foundations such as Fedaeps, became the closing activity for the annual acts in honor of LGBT Pride. In 2002, the festival began to be held at Plaza del Teatro, the ending point of the city's pride march. The following year's edition featured the participation of Mexican deputy Enoé Uranga Muñoz.

Since 2005, both the march and the pride festival became more visible events, on the initiative of activist Orlando Montoya. In the following years, Fundación Equidad took charge of organizing the festival, which was held each edition at Plaza Foch and, in addition to musical performances, incorporated drag queen shows. The 2016 edition, the last to be held at Plaza Foch, featured an entrepreneurship fair where LGBT merchants set up kiosks to sell products.

Due to its role as the closing event of the pride march, the festival changed locations several times starting in 2017. Both that year and in 2018, it was held at Cumandá Urban Park, while in 2019 it moved to the athletic track at La Carolina Park. This site once again became the festival's venue in 2022, after two years in which it was not held due to the COVID-19 pandemic. In 2023, the festival was held at the headquarters of the Casa de la Cultura Ecuatoriana, and in 2024 at Bicentennial Park.

=== Guayaquil ===
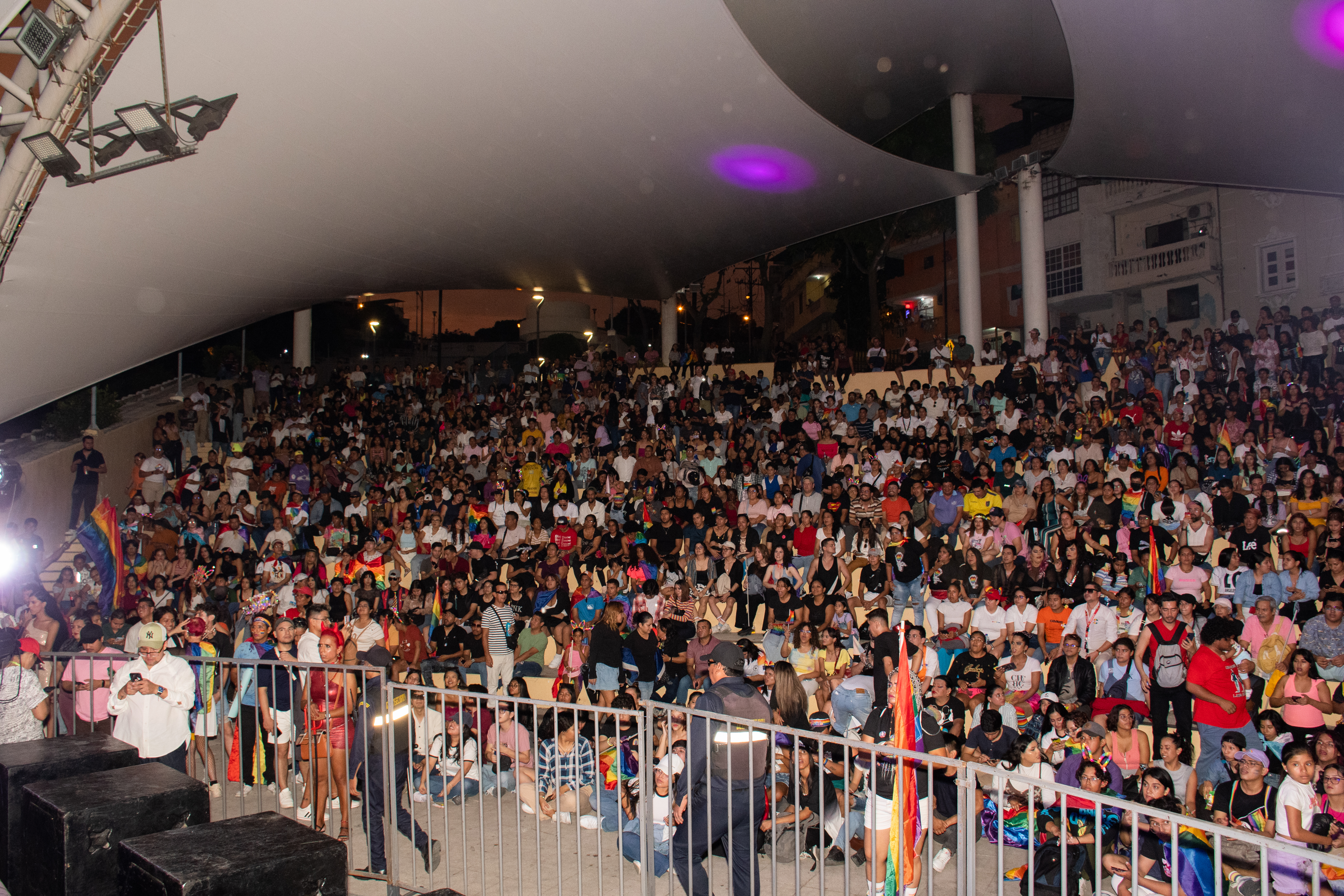
2024 Guayaquil Pride Festival, held at Plaza Colón.

As part of the celebrations for International LGBT Pride Day, an artistic festival takes place each year in Guayaquil after the conclusion of the pride march. During the evening, musical performances by artists take place, including figures such as Oveja Negra and Jasú Montero.

The first of these festivals took place in 2006 and preceded the first edition of the march by two years. The event was named Festival Arte y Diversidad (Art and Diversity Festival) and was organized by the Famivida foundation. In the years before 2006, Famivida had tried to obtain the necessary municipal permits to hold a pride march, but faced with the mayor's refusal, they decided instead to hold the festival, which took place at the intersection of Orrantia and Alcívar avenues in the Kennedy neighborhood, and was coordinated by activist Óscar Ugarte. The event was repeated in the same location in 2007 and 2008.

In 2013, the festival began to be held at the intersection of Nueve de Octubre and Lorenzo de Garaycoa avenues, at the Parque Centenario point where the pride march ended, and was renamed the Festival de la Diversidad Cultural del Guayas (Guayas Cultural Diversity Festival). The event, whose organization passed to the Silueta X Association, continued to be held in the same place in subsequent years, with a stage set up at the site.

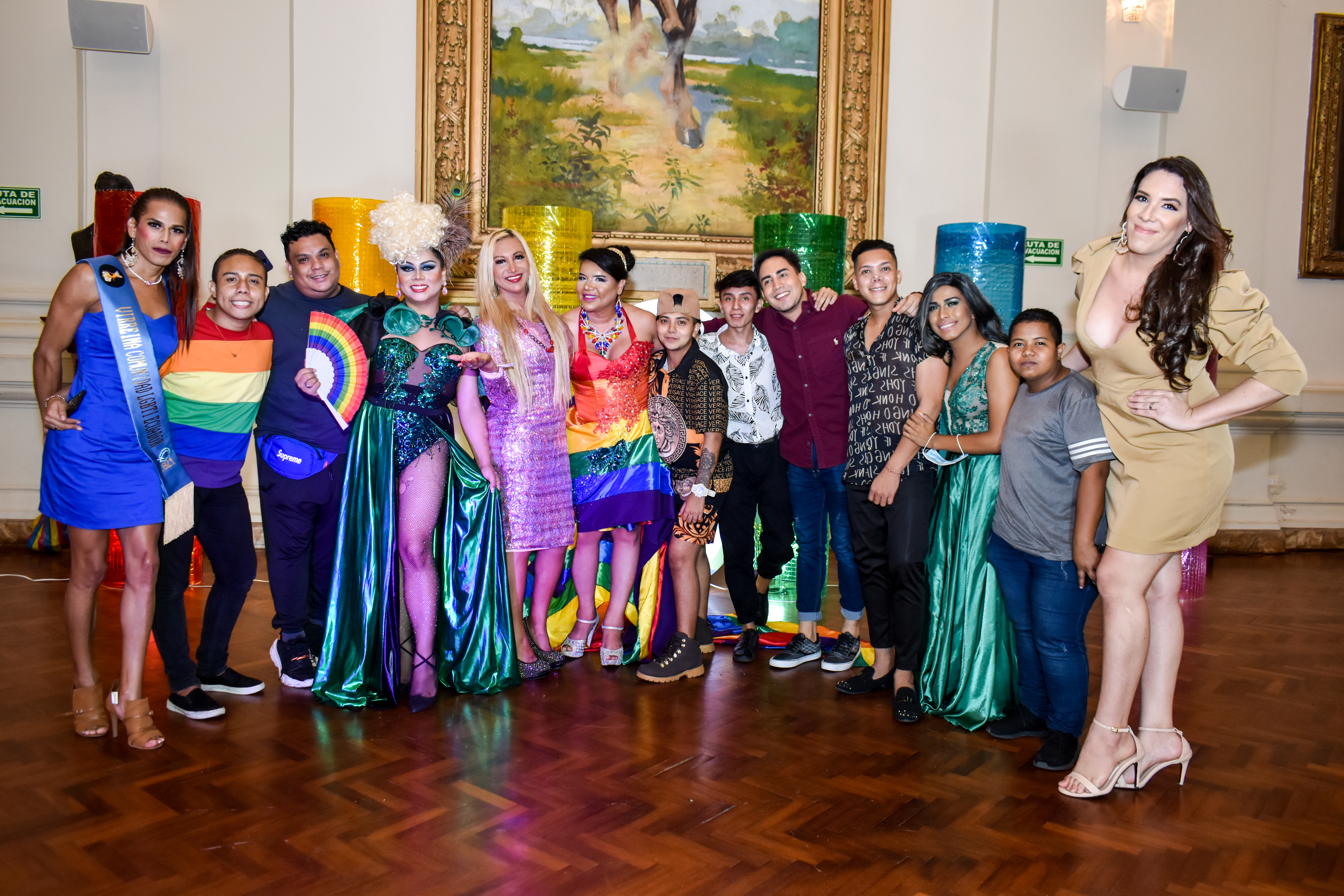
Virtual celebration of the 2021 Guayaquil pride festival.

Due to the COVID-19 pandemic, both the march and the Guayaquil pride festival were canceled in 2020 and 2021. In their place, virtual festivals were held that were streamed on social media via streaming. Organized by Silueta X and the Ecuadorian Federation of LGBT Organizations, they consisted of artistic performances conducted from a central studio.

In 2023, the municipality of Guayaquil denied permits to hold the march and the festival, arguing that the event would generate vehicular traffic in the city center. However, the decision was reversed by a judge after a legal protection action was filed. The festival ultimately took place without incident at Plaza Colón, where it was held again the following year.

=== Other cities ===
In the city of Cuenca, an annual pride festival takes place as the closing event of the pride march, featuring musical, theatrical, and drag queen performances. For the evening, a stage is set up in the square or park where the march ends, which over the years has included places like La Merced Square, San Francisco Plaza, and the Puente Roto sector. The festival has been held as the march's closing event since 2015, although in years prior to the march's inception, festivals in honor of LGBT Pride also took place. In 2012, the first of these celebrations was held when around 150 people gathered at La Merced Square, organized by the Verde Equilibrante group, and participated in a musical performance and a release of colorful balloons.

Other Ecuadorian localities that hold festivals in honor of LGBT Pride include cities such as Loja, which usually holds it at San Sebastián Square, Ibarra, where it was first held in 2023, Manta, Machala, and Ambato.

== Other events ==
Each year in Cuenca, numerous activities take place during the month of June to commemorate LGBT Pride, including film screenings, gatherings of transgender women, book clubs, workshops, evenings in memory of the Abanicos bar raid, and pride fairs. Celebrations for International LGBT Pride Day began in Cuenca in 2012, and the following year a high-heel race was held for the first time in the city, becoming a recurring annual event that has featured the participation of local authorities.

Throughout LGBT Pride Month, the city of Loja holds commemorative acts that have the support of local authorities, such as the provincial governor, and include talks on rights and sexual diversity, weekly film forums, drag queen bingos, fairs featuring LGBT-owned businesses, sports events, and high-heel races. Additionally, local authorities illuminate several city parks with the colors of the rainbow and place an LGBT flag on the facade of the municipality.

In Ambato, an LGBTI week is held during June that includes, among other activities, forums on LGBT rights, workshops, musical performances, and film, painting, and poetry showcases. In Ibarra, on the other hand, events such as solemn acts in honor of LGBT Pride and campaigns against labor discrimination against LGBT people have taken place, with the support of Mayor Andrea Scacco and the city municipality,

El Oro Province has a rich agenda of pride activities that takes place each June and is organized by the Provincial Coalition of LGBTIQ+ Organizations. These activities range from film forums, beauty pageants, artistic performances, free haircut sessions, workshops, and evenings where LGBT flags are placed on government buildings. These activities bring together participants from across the province and are held throughout the month in the towns of Machala, Pasaje, Puerto Bolívar, and Santa Rosa.

In Esmeraldas Province, pride events take place in cities such as Esmeraldas and Quinindé. In the former, a crosswalk was painted with the colors of the rainbow in June 2021, which was attended by the United Nations High Commissioner and received support from the local municipality. In Quinindé, on the other hand, LGBT beauty pageants and sports tournaments have been held in June.

On June 28, 2017, inmates belonging to sexual diversity groups at the Cotopaxi Social Rehabilitation Center, located in Latacunga, held a fashion show to commemorate LGBT Pride Day. The event was attended by several provincial authorities, who later chose the best-dressed inmate of the parade. There was also a choreographed dance by a group of lesbian inmates.

== See also ==
- International LGBT Pride Day
- LGBT history in Ecuador

== Bibliography ==
- González, Daniela (2021). Reconstrucción de la historia del movimiento LGBTI+ en Cuenca en el periodo 1997-2017, a través de historias de vida [Reconstruction of the history of the LGBTI+ movement in Cuenca in the period 1997-2017, through life stories] (PDF). Cuenca: University of Cuenca. Archived from the original (PDF) on 2022-04-19.
