= Quito Pride =

Pride parade in Quito, Ecuador

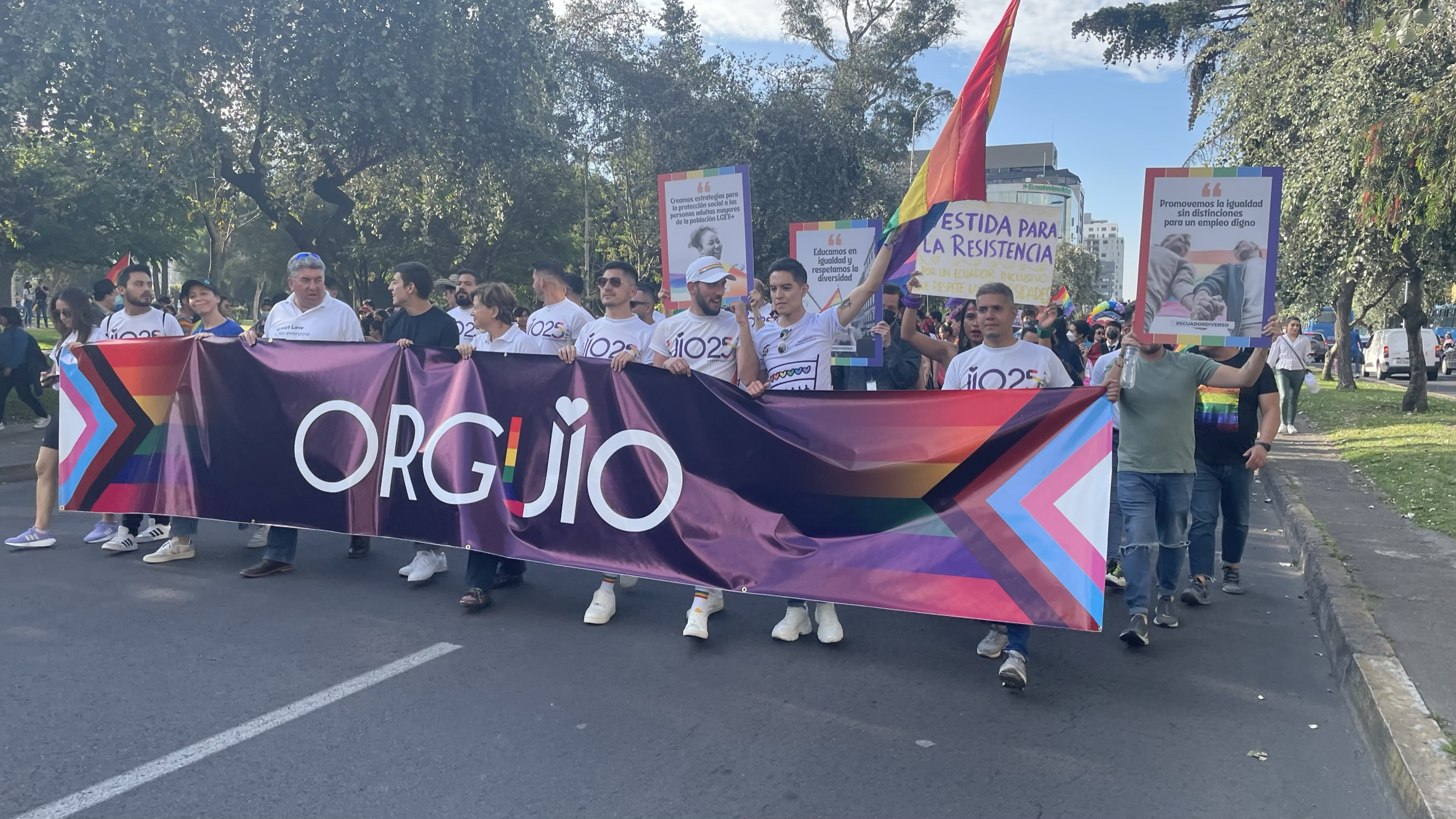
- Genre: pride parade
- Date: June
- Frequency: annually
- Location: Quito
- Country: Ecuador
- Years active: 2008–present
- Inaugurated: 28 June 2008

The LGBT Pride March of Quito (Spanish: Marcha del Orgullo LGBT de Quito), commonly known as Quito Pride, is a demonstration that is held annually in the city of Quito, capital of Ecuador, in commemoration of the International LGBT Pride Day. During the march, people belonging to the LGBT populations and straight allies walk through the streets of the city along with floats, pride flags, masks and colorful costumes.

The march was held for the first time in 1998 and had hundred of attendants during its fist editions. Over the years, the march has gradually increased the number of participants, reaching about 25,000 by 2022.

Among the political authorities who have attended the march as a way to show their support are Pabel Muñoz, mayor of the city, and Paola Pabón, provincial prefect of Pichincha, both of whom attended the 2023 edition. Previously, the march had been attended by municipal councilors, including Margarita Carranco, who attended in 2008.

== History ==
=== First editions (1998-2005) ===
The first LGBT pride march in Quito was held on June 28, 1998, the year after the decriminalization of homosexuality in Ecuador was achieved. This was also the first march of this type in the history of the country. The event was organized by the Fedaeps Foundation and was attended by about twenty people who started the march in the El Arbolito Park and walked along Patria, Amazonas, Ignacio de Veintimilla, 6 de Diciembre and Alfredo Baquerizo Moreno Avenues, until they reached the Fedaeps facilities.

The event was organized again on June 28, 2001, and since then it has been held annually. That edition had the participation of a hundred people. The first editions of the march were held in the historic center of Quito and were organized by Fedaeps and the national LGBT network. The 2002 march began in the Plaza de San Blas and culminated in the Plaza del Teatro, where a stage for a musical show was installed; while the 2003 march, which had about 400 participants, began in the Plaza de Santo Domingo and ended in the same way in the Plaza del Teatro. The marches of 2004 and 2005 traveled along Guayaquil Street and culminated in the Plaza de Santo Domingo, although the second reached less attendance than past editions.

=== Festivals and marches in La Mariscal (2005-2016) ===
In June 2005, in parallel to the march carried out by Fedaeps in the historic center, the LGBT organization Fundación Ecuatoriana Equidad organized a pride festival, on the initiative of activist Orlando Montoya. This festival continued to be held in subsequent years and then became the closing event of the pride march, which since 2008 was organized by Equidad and moved its route to the La Mariscal sector, in the north of the city. That year's march began at the facilities of the Ministry of Culture and Heritage and culminated in Plaza Foch, which became the recurring site of the pride festival. This edition was attended by feminist Councilwoman Margarita Carranco. In 2007, the transgender indigenous folk group Ñuca Trans made its debut.

The Corporación Kimirina and the Casa de la hermana trans organizations joined Equidad in organizing the event in its 2009 edition. That year's route began at the Colón and Juan León Mera avenues, followed the Amazonas and Ignacio de Veintimilla avenues and ended in Plaza Foch for the music festival. Until 2016, the march continued following a similar route and ending in Plaza Foch.

In terms of attendance, for 2013 the march reached 2500 attendees.

=== Return to the historic center (2017-2018) ===
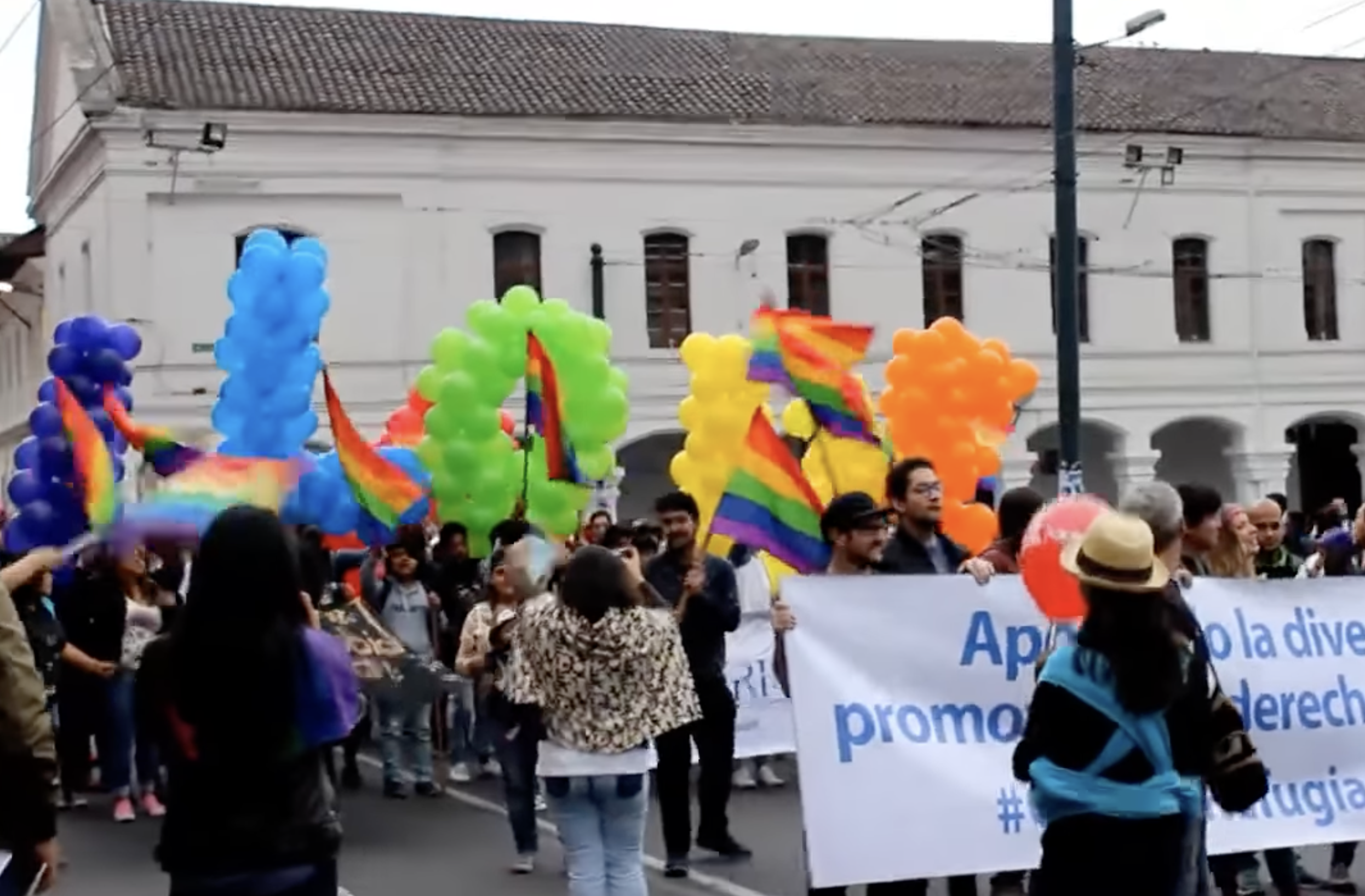
2018 edition of Quito Pride.

In 2017, the pride march returned to the historic center of Quito, in remembrance of the twentieth anniversary of the decriminalization of homosexuality in Ecuador. The event took place on July 1 and its route began in Plaza Simón Bolívar, in La Alameda Park, continued along Guayaquil Street and culminated in the Cumandá Urban Park, where the artistic festival took place. Days before the march, national authorities illuminated the Carondelet Palace with the colors of the LGBT flag in honor of International Pride Day, a fact that was repeated at later dates.

The 2018 march followed the same route as the previous year and had an attendance of about 10,000 people. The walk was led by activist Geovanny Jaramillo and was attended by Helen Bicknell and Nicky Rothon, plaintiffs in the Satya Case.

=== Recent marches (since 2019) ===
In 2019, the march was relocated to the La Carolina Park area and held on June 29. It was originally scheduled to begin at the intersection of Japan and United Nations avenues, but the route was later extended to start at Amazonas and De la República avenues, continue along Amazonas, United Nations, and Shyris avenues, and conclude at the athletic track in La Carolina Park, where the accompanying festival took place. An alternate Pride march was also held, beginning at the intersection of 10 de Agosto and Río Cofanes avenues.

The 2019 march took place shortly after the legalization of same-sex marriage in Ecuador, which occurred on June 12 following a ruling by the Constitutional Court. As a result, it coincided with a demonstration organized by conservative groups earlier that day in opposition to the court's decision.

The Pride march was canceled in 2020 and 2021 due to the COVID-19 pandemic, while the 2022 edition was postponed until July 30 because of a national strike in Ecuador. The march followed the same route as the 2019 event around La Carolina Park and attracted approximately 25,000 attendees.

The 2023 march was attended by the mayor of Quito, Pabel Muñoz, and the prefect of Pichincha, Paola Pabón. The route began at the intersection of Amazonas Avenue and Luis Cordero Street and continued to the Casa de la Cultura Ecuatoriana at the intersection of 6 de Diciembre and Patria avenues. In 2024, the march began at the intersection of Amazonas and Villalengua avenues and concluded at Parque Bicentenario.

== See also ==
- Cuenca Pride
- Guayaquil Pride
- LGBT pride in Ecuador
- LGBTQIA+ in Guayaquil
