= Famivida =

Dissolved LGBTQ+ rights organization in Ecuador

- Fundación Amigos por la Vida
- Formation: August 15, 1995
- Dissolved: 2014
- Type: LGBT rights, prevention of HIV/AIDS
- Legal status: NGO
- Headquarters: Guayaquil, Ecuador

Fundación Amigos por la Vida (Famivida) was a non-profit organization in Ecuador created in 1995 that promoted the defense of LGBT rights and the prevention of sexually transmitted infections. It was the first LGBT organization in the history of the city of Guayaquil. Among its members were activists such as Neptalí Arias Zambrano (president of the foundation since its creation), Óscar Ugarte, Gonzalo Abarca and Lía Burbano.

By 2014, the foundation had ceased operations. It was active at least until June 2011.

== History ==
Famivida was officially created on August 15, 1995, under ministerial agreement 2140 of the Ministry of Public Health. It was registered as an organization in favor of HIV/AIDS prevention, without mentioning the defense of LGBT rights, due to the fact that at the time of its creation, homosexuality was still considered a crime in Ecuador.

After the Bar Abanicos police raid, which occurred on June 14, 1997, in an LGBT bar in the city of Cuenca, in which several of the detainees suffered abuse and rape, Famivida joined the LGBT groups Fedaeps, Coccinelle, and Tolerancia, in order to form a united front under the name of Triángulo Andino with the purpose of achieving the decriminalization of homosexuality. After agreeing to file an unconstitutionality lawsuit against Article 516 of the Penal Code, the article that criminalized homosexuality, they began a campaign to collect signatures of support, which was one of the requirements for filing the lawsuit. As a result of the campaign, on September 17, the first public demonstration of LGBT people in the history of Guayaquil was held in front of the Court of Justice. On November 25 of the same year, the Constitutional Court annulled the first clause of Article 516 of the Penal Code, thus decriminalizing homosexuality in Ecuador. Once the decriminalization process was completed, Famivida restructured itself to include the defense of LGBT rights among its objectives.

On June 28, 2000, members of Famivida attempted to organize the first LGBT Pride March in Guayaquil, for which they managed to gather around 300 people. However, a group of 60 police officers surrounded the participants and fired tear gas at them, in an event that was denounced by Amnesty International. After being dispersed by the police, many of those present escaped to the Judah LGBT bar, located on Los Ríos and Clemente Ballén streets. However, police arrived at the bar shortly thereafter and raided the bar along with cameramen from the open television channel Canal Uno, who filmed those present.

In the following years, Famivida continued to denounce cases of homophobia and abuse by the authorities. Together with the Ombudsman's Office, it also denounced the abuses committed during the permanent operation called “Caballero Rosa” (Pink Knight), established by governor Guido Chiriboga Parra, which sought to “eradicate the presence of transvestites and transsexuals” in Barrio Orellana.

From 2002 to 2004, Famivida asked Mayor Nebot for permission to hold an LGBT pride march in the city, but the mayor refused on all three occasions, stating that “society was not ready". Because of these refusals, the members of Famivida did not attempt to obtain the permits in 2005 and instead, commemorated International LGBT Pride Day with an event in which they presented awards to public figures of the local LGBT community. The following year, they decided to hold an art festival called “Art and Diversity” at the intersection of Orrantia and Alcívar avenues, in the Kennedy neighborhood, coordinated by Óscar Ugarte. Although they did not have permits to hold the event, they went ahead with it since, being a presidential election year, they knew that no politician would want to get into controversy over the event. The festival was repeated in 2007 and 2008.

During the third edition of this festival, held on June 28, 2008, and organized by Famivida, attendees marched for the first time on Delta Avenue, making it the first LGBT Pride March in Guayaquil.

== Mujer & Mujer ==
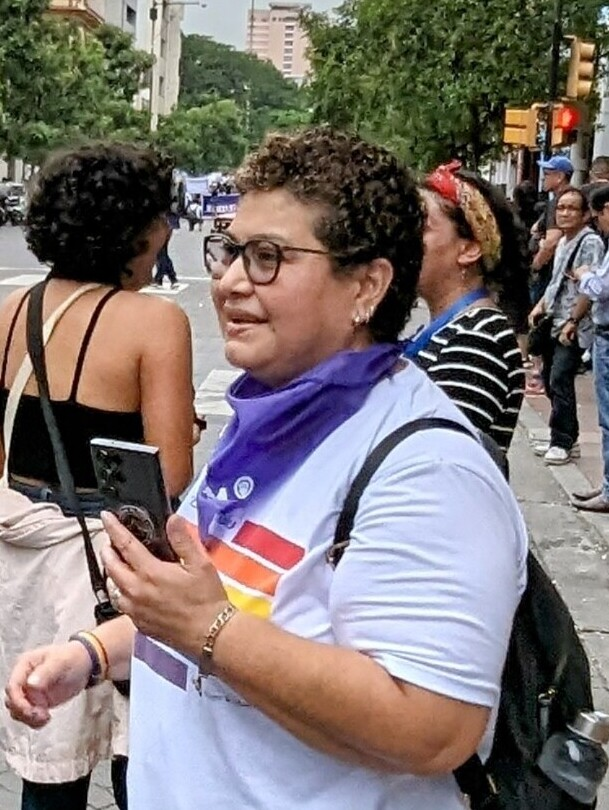
Lía Burbano in 2024

On March 8, 2003, Lía Burbano, one of the members of Famivida, organized a women's meeting at the foundation that was very well received. As a result of this meeting, they agreed to form a group within Famivida under the name of Mujer & Mujer that would bring together lesbian women, thus becoming the first lesbian group in the city. The group grew in the following years and in 2005, participated in the National Lesbian Encounter organized by the Quito foundation Causana.

Due to disagreements with Famivida leaders, the members of Mujer & Mujer later decided to separate and form their own foundation.

== See also ==
- LGBTQIA+ in Guayaquil
- Timeline of LGBT history in Ecuador
- Guayaquil Pride
- LGBT pride in Ecuador
