= Villalva =

Villalva is a surname. Notable people with the surname include:

- Daniel Villalva (born 1992), Argentine footballer
- Lira Villalva (born 1983), Ecuadorian lawyer and politician
- María Guillermina Valdes Villalva (1939-1991), American academic and activist
- Romeo Villalva Tabuena (born 1921), Filipino painter and printmaker
