= Ñuca Trans =

Ecuadorian folk group

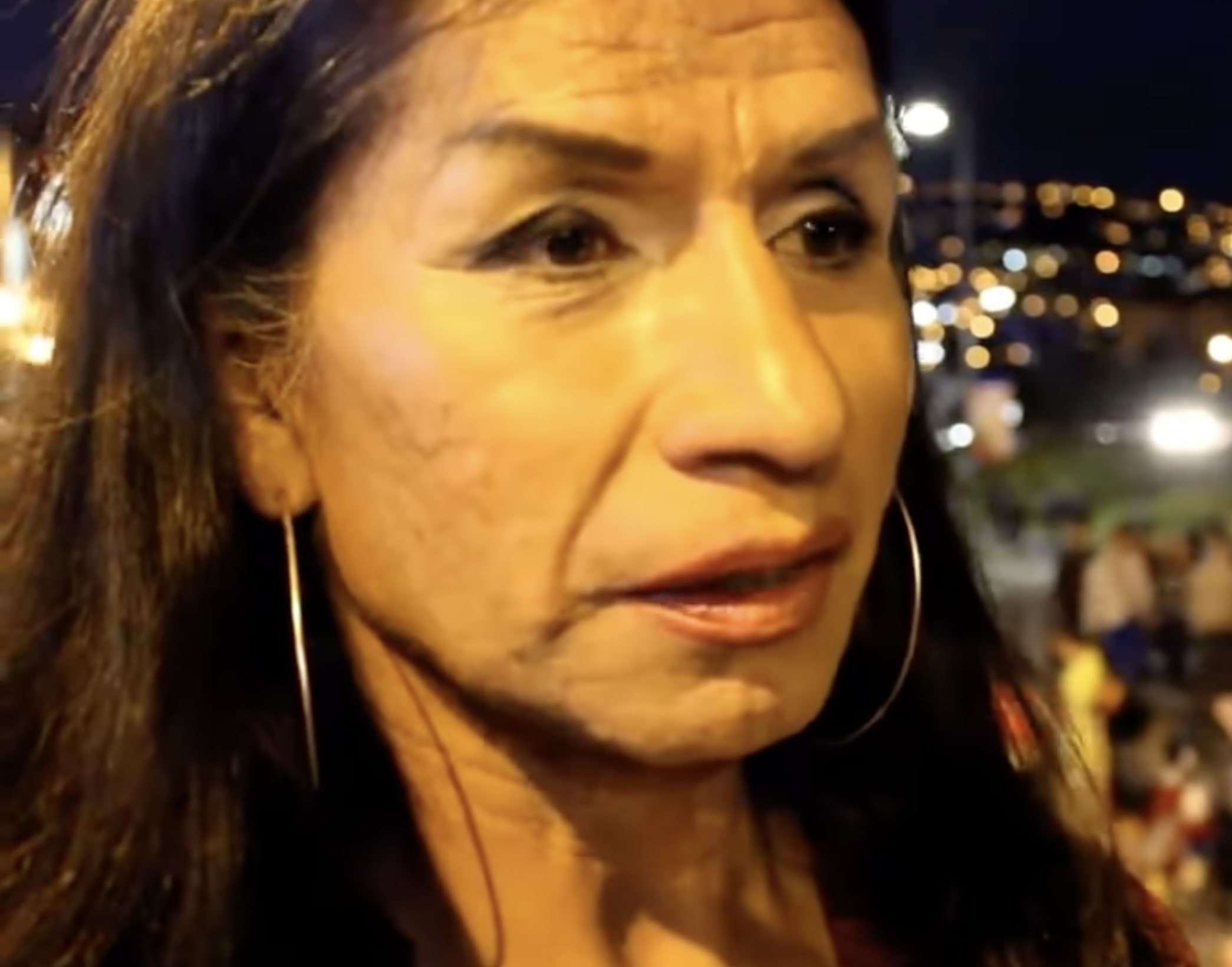
- Ñuca Trans member and coordinator Karla Pillajo at Quito Pride in 2018

Background information
- Origin: Quito, Ecuador
- Genres: Folk music Folk dance
- Years active: 2007–present
- Members: Katya Mishell Vásquez; Rashell Erazo; Jade Daviana Villacrez; Carmita; Vanessa Zambrano; Shantal López; La Nena Claudia; Alejandra Bohada; Karla Pillajo

Ñuca Trans is an Ecuadorian folk music and dance group, widely considered to be Ecuador's first folk group composed exclusively of transgender women. The band's name comes from the Kichwa term ñuca trans, meaning "we trans women". Ñuca Trans describes its mission as to show the Ecuadorian public the role transgender people can play in society as artists and promoters of local cultures; the group's dances, choreographed by its members, are largely based on indigenous traditions by the Otavalo and Kayambi peoples.

== History ==
Ñuca Trans was founded by transgender activist Katya Mishell Vásquez in 2007, with the initial goal to put on a folk performance performed by trans women at Quito Pride. Vásquez and six of her friends, who all were members of the trans organisation Alfil, wished to "break common stereotypes" about trans women; they all donned indigenous clothing from the Kayambi community, and performed dances originating from the Sierra region. After a positive reception to their performance at Quito Pride, Ñuca Trans decided to continue performing as a group.

Ñuca Trans' original members were Vásquez; Rashell Erazo; Jade Daviana Villacrez; Carmita; Vanesa Zambrano; Shantal López; and La Nena Claudia. All six had experienced discrimination in the years prior to the decriminalisation of homosexuality in 1997. In 2010, two new members, Alejandra Bohada and Karla Pillajo, joined the group. Since then, various other trans women have performed as part of Ñuca Trans.

Ñuca Trans primarily performs at LGBTQ events, including during commemorations of International Transgender Day of Visibility, International Day Against Homophobia, Biphobia and Transphobia, and International LGBT Pride Day. They have performed at venues including the Teatro Dionisios, Centro de Arte Contemporáneo de Quito, Plataforma Gubernamental de Quitumbe, and the historic centre of Quito.

In 2021, members of Ñuca Trans nominated the group's coordinator, Pillajo, for the Patricio Brabomalo Award for her activism, which she ultimately won. In November 2021, the Municipality of Quito formally recognised Ñuca Trans for contributions to LGBTQ and indigenous activism.
