= Lía Burbano =

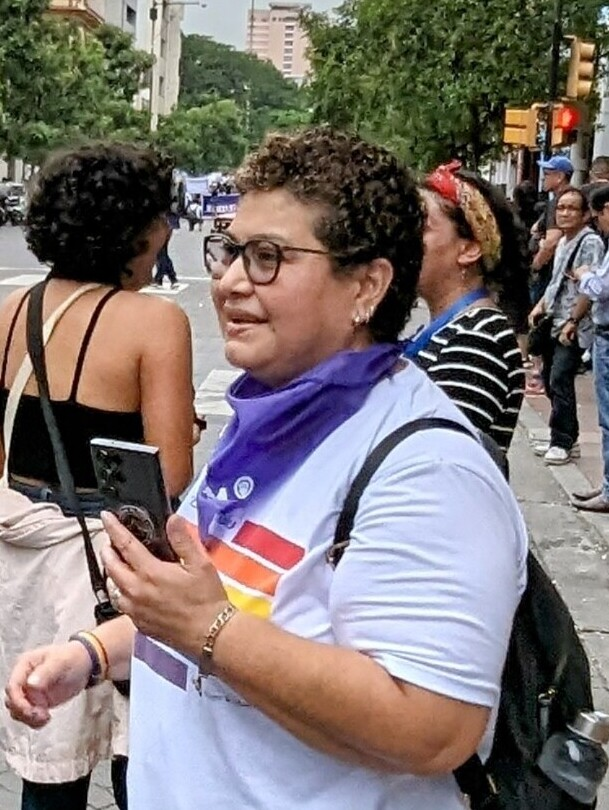
- Burbano in 2024
- Born: April 7, 1969 (age 57); Guayaquil, Ecuador
- Education: University of Guayaquil
- Occupations: LGBTQ activist; teacher

Lía Sayonara Burbano Mosquera (born April 7, 1969 in Guayaquil) is an Ecuadorian LGBTQ activist. She is the executive director of the Mujer & Mujer ('Women and Women') foundation, the first lesbian activism group in Guayaquil, which she established in 2003. She has also been a member of the UN Women Ecuadorian Civil Society Advisory Group.

== Early life and education ==
Burbano was born on April 7, 1969 in Guayaquil, Guayas Province, Ecuador. She attended the University of Guayaquil, earning a bachelor's degree in communication sciences.

At the age of 20, she left home and joined a convent with the intention of becoming a nun. However, she was expelled after the local authorities discovered that she had started a relationship with a companion of the novitiate.

== Activism ==
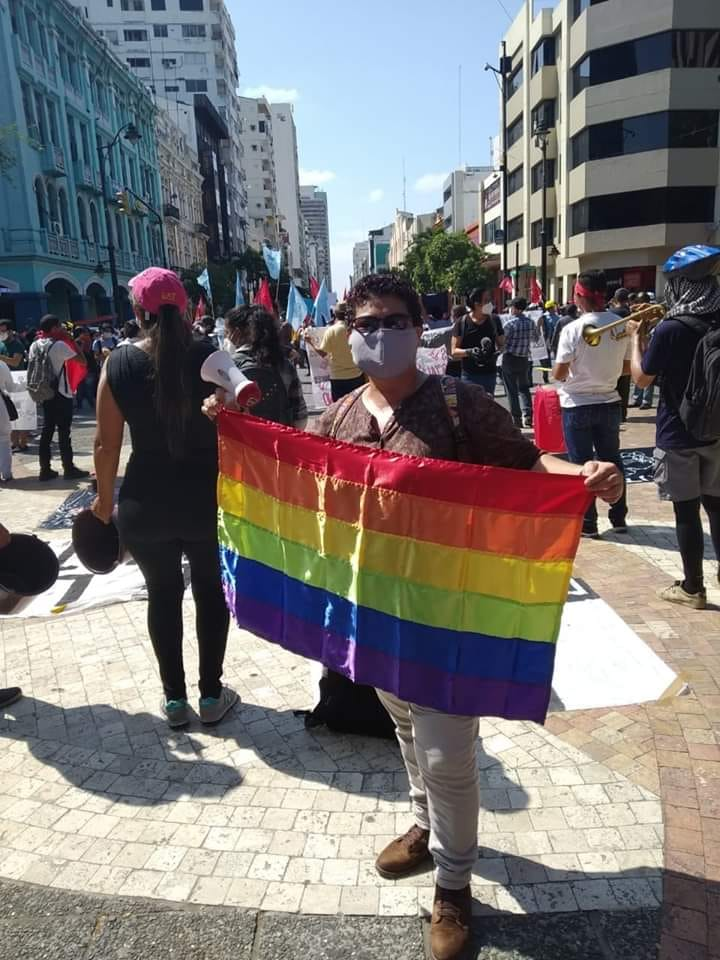
Lía Burbano during a protest in Guayaquil in 2020.

In 2000, Burbano became involved in LGBTQ activism after joining the Guayaquil foundation Famivida. At that time, the foundation was preparing for the city's first pride march. The group obtained permits for the march; however, Famivida had little prominence at the time and participants were repressed by the police. Due to her attendance at the event, Burbano was fired from the school where she worked.

On March 8, 2003, Burbano organized a meeting of lesbian women for Famivida, which was well received. This led to the creation of a women's group of Famivida, called Mujer & Mujer ('Women and Women'). This group was the first lesbian activist group in the history of Guayaquil. In 2005, Burbano appeared on a Teleamazonas television interview, becoming one of the first openly lesbian women from Guayaquil to appear on television and talk about activism.

Due to disagreements with the leadership of Famivida, Mujer & Mujer later became independent from Famivida. Since then, Burbano has served as executive director of the organization.

== Personal life ==
Burbano has identified as lesbian since age 15. She has a son from a relationship with a woman she met at the University of Guayaquil. Their son was conceived through artificial insemination, and was raised together by both women. The two women separated after 10 years.

== Sources ==
- Garita Sánchez, Ana (2021). Hacerse voz: hacia una comprensión del sujeto, la subjetividad y la identidad política lésbica de Quito y Guayaquil a través del espacio biográfico [Making a Voice: Towards an Understanding of the Subject, Subjectivity, and Lesbian Political Identity in Quito and Guayaquil through Biographical Space] (PDF) (Master's degree thesis) (in Spanish). Quito: Facultad Latinoamericana de Ciencias Sociales. pp. 66–80. Archived from the original (PDF) on 2022-07-03.
- Sancho, Fernando, ed. (2020), Del silencio a la visibilidad: activismos, politización y derechos humanos de las mujeres lesbianas en Ecuador [From silence to visibility: activism, politicization, and human rights of lesbian women in Ecuador] (PDF) (in Spanish), Quito: Consejo Nacional para la Igualdad de Género, archived from the original (PDF) on 2021-04-29
