= Óscar Ugarte (journalist) =

Ecuadorian journalist and LGBTQ activist

- Born: c. 1956
- Education: National University of La Plata
- Occupations: Journalist; LGBTQ activist

Óscar Ugarte Ordóñez (b. 1955/1956) is an Ecuadorian journalist, LGBTQ activist, and documentary director. He was one of the first public figures in Ecuador to come out, and among the first openly LGBTQ people to run for elected office in the country.

He has been involved with LGBTQ organizations such as Famivida, Fundación Ecuatoriana Equidad and Ecuador Diverso, an organization he presided over. He was also president of the Association of Ecological and Tourism Journalists (Asopet), which he founded in 1999.

== Career ==
He studied journalism at the National University of La Plata in Argentina.

On television, he worked at TC Televisión alongside personalities like Fausto Valdiviezo. In the 1990s, he hosted a TV show whose celebrity section launched the television career of host Mariela Viteri. He later hosted Viva la Tierra on Mundovisión and produced environmental reports for the news program El Noticiero.

Ugarte came out publicly in 2001 and has since been active in LGBTQ rights advocacy.

In 2006, as part of Famivida, he organized the arts festival "Art and Diversity" to commemorate International LGBT Pride Day, considered a precursor to the Guayaquil LGBT Pride March. Due to previous permit denials by the city of Guayaquil, Ugarte organized the festival without official authorization, anticipating that with elections approaching, authorities would avoid controversy. He also helped organize the first Guayaquil LGBT Pride March in 2009.

In the 2007 Ecuadorian Constituent Assembly elections, he ran as a candidate from Guayas province for the Social Constituent Front. These elections were the first in which openly LGBTQ people ran for public office. Other candidates included activists Mabell García, Any Argudo, Elizabeth Vásquez, Francisco Guayasamín, and Thalía Álvarez. Ugarte ran as a representative of the LGBTQ community, advocating for the legalization of civil unions for same-sex couples, though not same-sex marriage.

In 2011, he received the Pride and Diversity Award, presented by LGBTQ members in Guayaquil. He also temporarily held a seat in the Guayaquil Municipal Council.

As a documentary director, his short films focus on ecology. He has also directed LGBTQ-themed documentaries, including the short Diversos y visibles, screened at the 2012 El Lugar Sin Límites International LGBT Film Festival.
