= Janneth Peña =

Ecuadorian LGBTQ rights activist (born 1961)

- Born: 1961 (age 64–65); Cuenca, Ecuador
- Known for: LGBTQ activism

Janneth Peña López (born c. 1961) is an Ecuadorian LGBTQ rights activist. She is considered one of the pioneers of lesbian activism in Cuenca, and in 2011 was the first LGBTQ person in Ecuador to obtain a widow's pension for the death of her same-sex partner. Additionally, she was a founder of the Ecuadorian Organization of Lesbian Women (OEML) and the LGBT collective Cuenca Inclusiva.

== Biography ==
She married at seventeen and had two children with her husband. In 1990, she divorced, and three years later began a romantic relationship with the activist Sandra Álvarez, who was her first female partner and with whom she remained for twelve years. In June 1997, Peña's family found out about the relationship and brutally beat her and Álvarez, so both went to the police to report the incident. However, the police only gave them a distress note and, instead of accepting the complaint, threatened to imprison them, because at that time homosexuality was still a crime in Ecuador, with a penalty of four to eight years in prison.

After this experience, they both moved to Quito and started working in a feminist organization. However, within this group they suffered homophobic discrimination, so they decided to create an organization that focused on the defense of the rights of lesbian women and helped to make them visible. Thus, together with other women, they founded the Ecuadorian Organization of Lesbian Women (OEML) in June 2002, which became one of the first lesbian organizations in the country.

During the drafting process of the 2008 Constitution of Ecuador, Peña was one of the activists who went to Montecristi to promote the approval of articles in the Magna Carta that expanded the rights of queer people.

On March 22, 2011, Peña's romantic partner, activist Thalía Álvarez, died of pancreatic cancer. Peña had met Álvarez in 2005 and they had registered a de facto union in 2010, which was possible after the legalization of this right for same-sex couples in the 2008 Constitution. However, she found it difficult to carry out the procedures to be able to cremate her due to the prejudices she suffered for having been a lesbian couple, including during the removal of her corpse from the morgue and the signing of family authorizations at the funeral home.

In August 2011, Peña requested the Ecuadorian Institute of Social Security (IESS) the montepío and cesantía pension that corresponded to her for having a de facto union with Álvarez. After a process of months in which she received several refusals, on December 14 it was announced that Peña would receive these benefits, marking the first time in Ecuadorian history that a same-sex couple received this recognition. As a result of the case, the IEES announced that from that moment on, other couples of the same sex could receive the same benefit.

After obtaining the pension, Peña moved back to Cuenca and continued to participate in activism. In March 2014, she occupied the empty chair of the cantonal council along with two other activists during the debate on the approval of an ordinance that will guarantee the rights of LGBT people in the city. That same year, she protested against the decision of the municipality of Cuenca to give permission to walk for only two and a half blocks during the first edition of the LGBT Pride March of Cuenca, which led to the approval of a longer route.

In 2017, together with other activists, she started an initiative called the Legal Patrol, with the aim of exposing the police abuses committed against transgender sex workers in Cuenca. The results of the initiative were presented to the Provincial Court of Azuay.

== Sources ==
- Garita, Ana (2021), Hacerse voz: hacia una comprensión del sujeto, la subjetividad y la identidad política lésbica de Quito y Guayaquil a través del espacio biográfico [Finding a Voice: Towards an Understanding of the Subject, Subjectivity, and Lesbian Political Identity in Quito and Guayaquil through Biographical Space] (PDF) (in Spanish), Quito: Facultad Latinoamericana de Ciencias Sociales, archived from the original (PDF) on 2022-07-03
- González, Daniela (2021), Reconstrucción de la historia del movimiento LGBTI+ en Cuenca en el periodo 1997-2017, a través de historias de vida [Reconstruction of the History of the LGBTI+ Movement in Cuenca (1997–2017) through Life Stories] (PDF) (in Spanish), Cuenca: Universidad de Cuenca, archived from the original (PDF) on 2022-04-19
