= Cuenca Pride =

Annual march in Cuenca, Ecuador

- Cuenca Pride
- Marcha del Orgullo LGBT de Cuenca
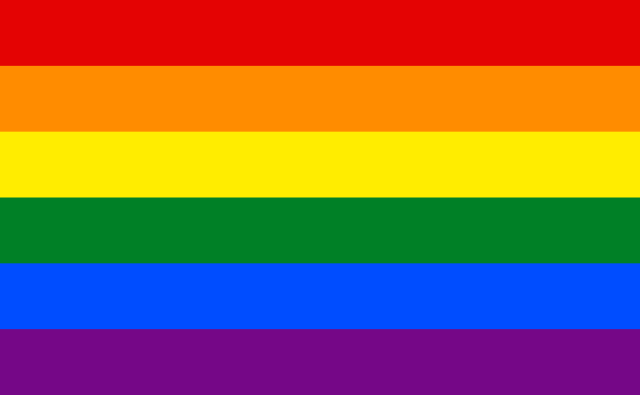
- Formation: June 23, 2014
- Type: Pride march
- Purpose: International LGBT Pride Day

Cuenca Pride is an annual march in the city of Cuenca, Ecuador, in commemoration of the International LGBT Pride Day. During the march, people from LGBT communities parade through the city streets wearing colorful clothing and holding signs with messages of advocacy, as a show of pride in their identity and as a commemoration of the struggle for social inclusion and the rights of sexual diversity.

The march was first held in 2014 and takes place each year in late June in the historic center of the city. Attendance reaches several thousand people each year, with approximately 5,000 attendees at the 2023 march. In addition to common activities held in other similar marches, the traditional burning of the vaca loca is a unique element of the Cuenca march.

== Background ==
Before the first pride march was held, LGBT activists in Cuenca celebrated International LGBT Pride Day with other advocacy events. In late June 2012, the group Verde Equilibrante became the first to commemorate the date with several activities culminating in an event titled “Illuminating the Dreams That Others Put Out,” held at La Merced Square, featuring a musical performance and the release of colorful balloons. Around 150 people attended, and later rode a two-story bus through the city streets alongside the local LGBTI queen.

The following year, the celebrations took place on June 28 in the Parque de la UNE, at the intersection of Presidente Córdova and Presidente Borrero streets. The event, which featured music, signs, and LGBT flags, was organized by Verde Equilibrante and the Silueta X Association, and concluded with a high heel race held on Presidente Borrero street between Mariscal Sucre and Presidente Córdova.

== Pride March ==
The first LGBT Pride March of Cuenca took place on June 23, 2014, shortly after the first debate approval of the Ordinance for Inclusion, Recognition, and Respect of Sexual and Gender Diversity in the Cuenca Canton. The event was organized by lesbian activists Vanessa Morocho and Yesenia Castro, with support from the Azuay LGBTI Network.

Initially, the municipality of Cuenca refused to grant permits to march through the city center, suggesting instead a two-block route on Paseo 3 de Noviembre. However, organizers, supported by other LGBT activists including Janneth Peña, demanded a more visible route. The municipality relented and approved a new path. The march ultimately followed Bolívar Street to Abdón Calderón Park, then Presidente Borrero Street to Calle Larga, and ended at Puente Roto, near the Todos los Santos Church. This first march included a *vaca loca* burning, which later became a tradition.

The Azuay LGBTI Network continued organizing the event in subsequent years. In 2015, the march began at Paseo 3 de Noviembre and ended at Puente Roto, featuring decorated floats, dance groups, and stilt walkers. This edition also featured, for the first time, a stage set up in La Merced Square, where artistic performances took place.

The 2019 march saw significantly higher turnout due to the recent legalization of same-sex marriage in Ecuador.

The 2022 edition was initially canceled due to the National Strike, but was eventually held on July 22. It started at the San Blas Park and ended at Puente Roto, where the traditional artistic show took place. The 2024 march, on the other hand, ended at the San Francisco Plaza and featured music, dance, theater, and drag queen performances.

== See also ==
- Quito Pride
- Guayaquil Pride
- LGBT pride in Ecuador

== Sources ==
- González, Daniela (2021). Reconstruction of the History of the LGBTI+ Movement in Cuenca (1997–2017) Through Life Histories (PDF). Cuenca: University of Cuenca. Archived from the original (PDF) on 2022-04-19.
