= Guayaquil Pride =

Annual LGBTQ event in Ecuador

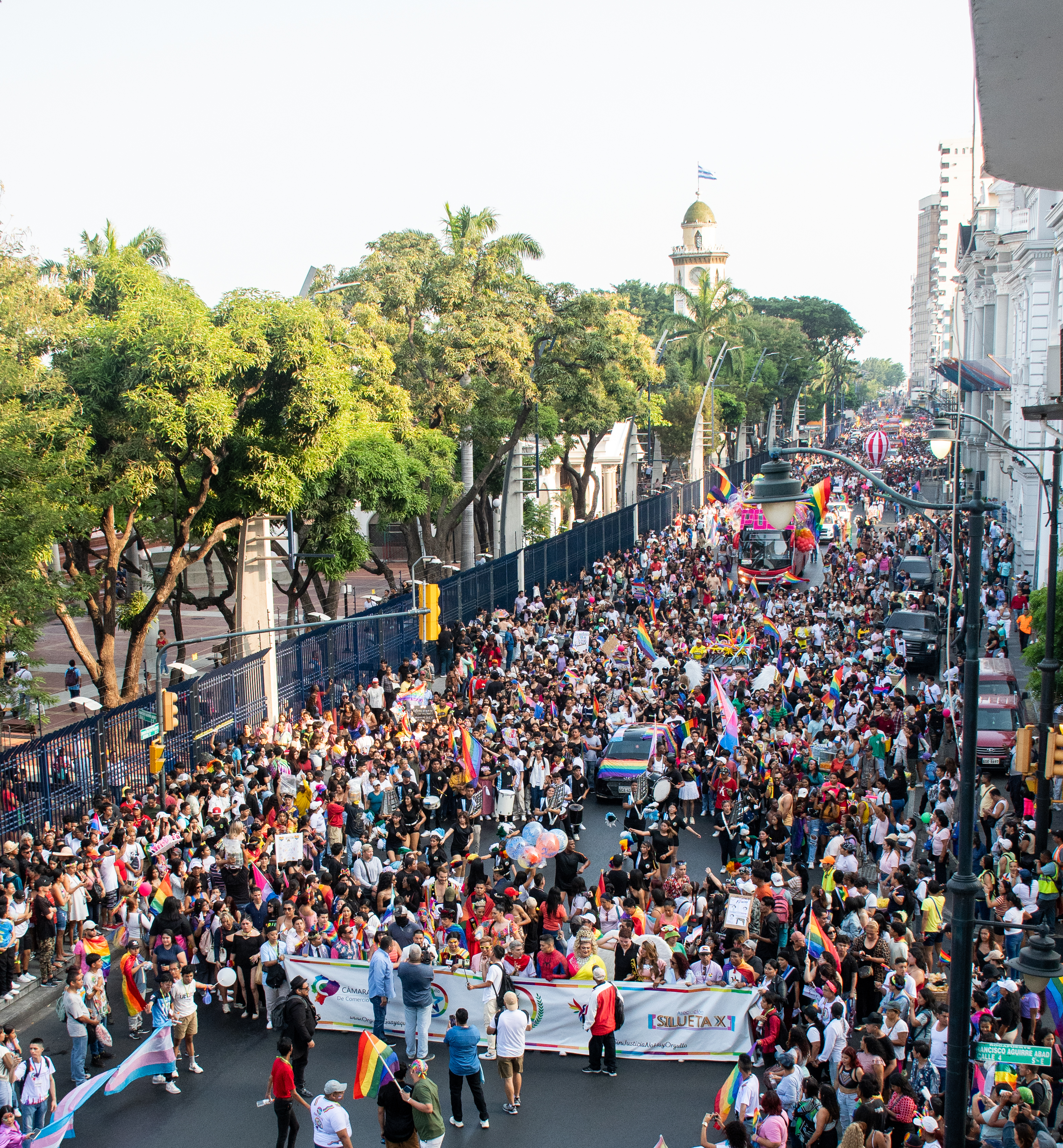
- Genre: pride parade
- Date: June
- Frequency: annually
- Location: Guayaquil
- Country: Ecuador
- Years active: 2008–present
- Inaugurated: 28 June 2008

The Guayaquil LGBT Pride March, commonly known as Guayaquil Pride, is a pride parade that is held annually in the Ecuadorian city of Guayaquil, within the framework of International LGBT Pride Day to commemorate the struggle for the rights of LGBTQ+ people. The event was held for the first time in 2008 and is one of the busiest annual parades in the city. Among the participants in the event there have been multiple important public figures, including artists and politicians such as the prefect of the province, National Assembly members and municipal councilors.

Every year, the march begins at the height of Avenida Olmedo and runs through part of Avenida Malecón Simón Bolívar, then continues along Avenida Nueve de Octubre and ends in the Centenario Park, in a route with an extension of about two and a half kilometers. After arriving at the final point, a pride festival takes place in which artistic shows are presented. During the march, parade floats participate and musical shows and dances take place. Additionally, each edition has a different theme related to respect and LGBT rights.

Attendance at the parade has grown gradually over the years and currently, in addition to local assistants, it receives participants from other cities and countries. The second edition, held in 2009, had 2000 attendees, while by 2018, it had reached 9,000. Attendance in the 2023 edition reached about 40,000 people.

== History ==
=== Background ===
The first public demonstration of LGBT people in Guayaquil took place in August 1997, although it was not related to International LGBT Pride Day but to the campaign to achieve the decriminalization of homosexuality in Ecuador, which was achieved that same year.

The first attempt to carry out a march for LGBT Pride in Guayaquil took place on June 28, 2000, and was organized by the Famivida foundation, the city's first LGBT organization. However, the police chief arrived at the scene and ordered the approximately 300 attendees to end the demonstration, then a group of approximately 60 police officers threw tear gas to disperse the crowd.

In 2001, LGBT groups requested permission to the local Police to hold a Pride march in the city, but the police chief verbally denied permission. However, two hours before the time requested to hold the event, the police chief changed his mind and accepted the request. Because of this, there was not enough time to organize the march and activists were only able to carry out a small gathering in a town square. During the following three years (from 2002 to 2004), activists asked Mayor Jaime Nebot for permission to carry out the march, but on all three occasions he refused by asserting that "society was not ready yet."

=== Art and Diversity Festival and first march (2005-2008) ===
Given the difficulty of obtaining permits from the mayor, the Famivida foundation, chaired by activist Neptalí Arias, decided not to try to obtain them in 2005 and instead commemorated the date with an event in which they delivered recognitions to public figures of the local LGBT community. The following year, Famivida organized an artistic festival called "Art and Diversity" in honor of International LGBT Pride Day at the intersection of Orrantia and Alcívar avenues, in the Kennedy neighborhood. According to activist Óscar Ugarte, coordinator of the festival, they decided to carry it out despite not having obtained the corresponding permits because on that same year there were presidential elections being held in the country, so the organizers knew that political figures would prefer not to interfere in any type of dispute. The festival was repeated without major problems in 2007 and 2008.

The third edition of the festival was the first to receive police authorization and the first to hold a parade. It was the first LGBT pride parade in the history of Guayaquil and took place on June 28, 2008. The route began at the intersection of Manuel Galecio and Los Ríos streets and took place along Delta Avenue, in the University of Guayaquil neighborhood, then continued along Francisco de Orellana Avenue and culminated in a platform next to the Radio Sucre facilities. The parade was made up of floats, buses and vans, and had delegations from LGBT organizations and establishments, such as the Vulcano nightclub, as well as a representative of Amnesty International. Although chronologically this was the first LGBT Pride March in Guayaquil, some media usually consider the first edition to be the 2009 march, which was the first to take place in the city's center.

=== First marches in the center of Guayaquil (2009-2013) ===
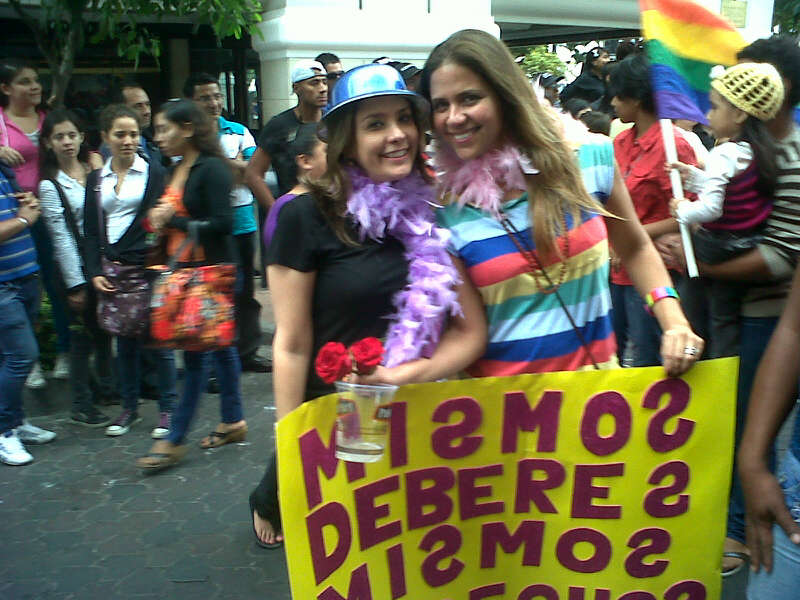
LGBT March 2013

The first Guayaquil LGBT Pride March in the city center took place in 2009. It began at Olmedo Avenue and traveled along Malecón Simón Bolívar Avenue. Among the attendees were public personalities such as National Assembly members Gina Godoy and Amanda Arboleda, in addition to councilors Gino Molinari and Octavio Villacreces. The march had a mishap when a cordon of metropolitan police blocked the way to the attendees at the height of the Guayaquil Municipality building. However, thanks to the intervention of the authorities present, the police finally let the march continue. The event had a turnout of approximately 2000 people.

The following year, the march began at the intersection of Lorenzo de Garaycoa and Víctor Manuel Rendón streets, covered a stretch of 9 de Octubre Avenue and ended on Rocafuerte Avenue, in the city's zona rosa.

In 2011, the march was attended by the National Police band, which sang traditional songs during the tour, such as "Guayaquileño, madera de guerrero". The event of that year had a similar route to that of the previous year, in addition to having the participation of figures such as TV personality Marián Sabaté, who was appointed queen of the parade, and the provincial vice prefect Luzmila Nicolalde, who read from a stage a resolution issued by the Provincial Council of Guayas in which June 28 was declared as the provincial day of the eradication and elimination of all forms of discrimination for reasons of a sexual nature, gender, race, religion or ethnic group.

The 2012 edition returned to the route of the 2009 march, while the 2013 one began in the building of the Governor of Guayas and ended in the Centennial Park. One of the main requests of the demonstration of that year was the legalization of same-sex marriage in the country. This edition was also notorious for having for the first time employees of the Governor of Guayas and the Provincial Prefecture on the route.

=== Marches with municipal authorization (2014-2022) ===
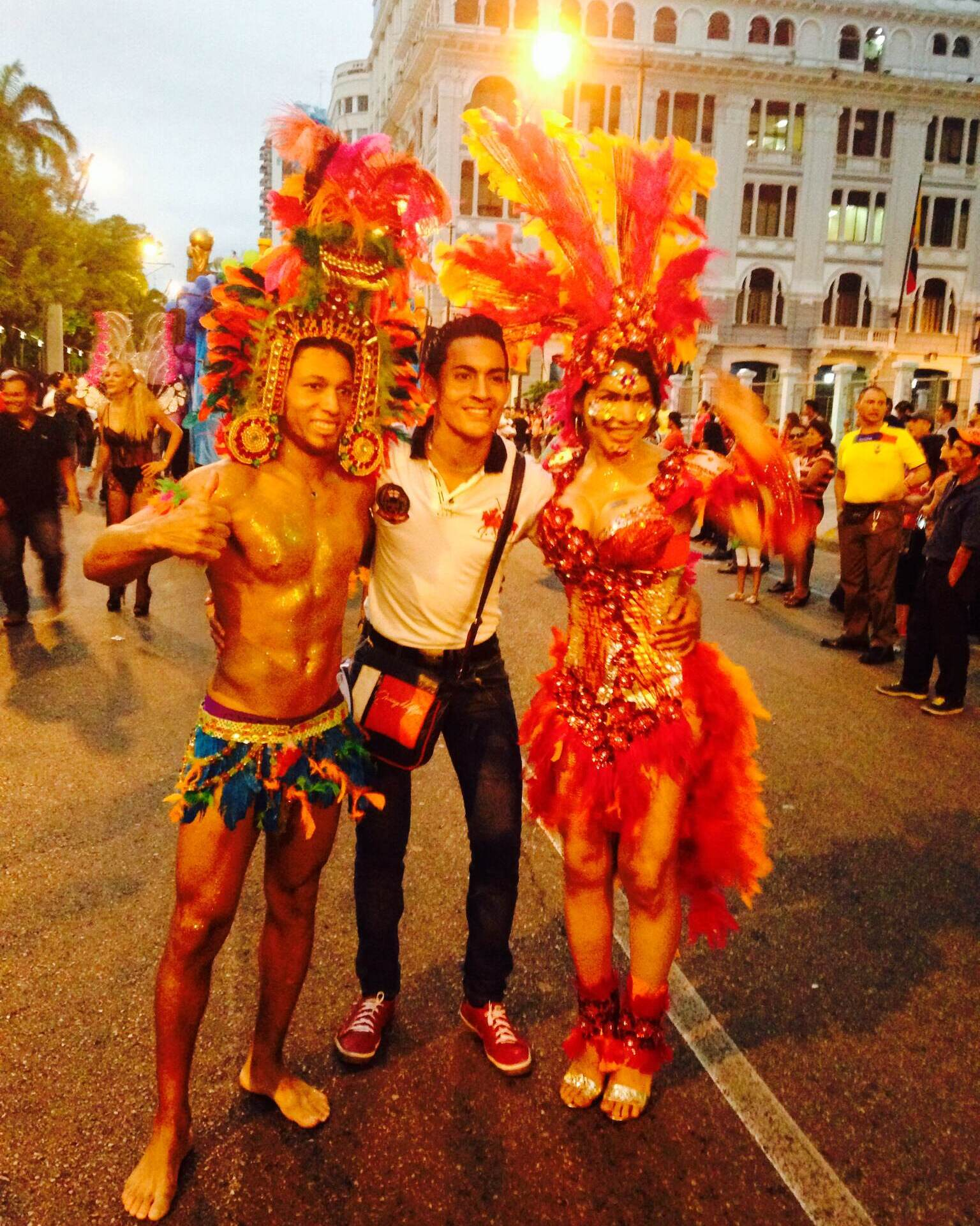
Marcha LGBT March 2014

On January 3, 2014, the municipality of Guayaquil issued a statement in which it announced the granting of the municipal authorization to carry out the pride march of that year, after a complaint filed by the organizations Asociación Silueta X, Fundación Ecuatoriana Equidad and Diverso Ecuador in December 2013. Thus, the 2014 march, held on June 28, became the first to have the official authorization of the mayor. The previous editions had been made with the authorization of the local Police Department. The route started again at the height of Olmedo Avenue, traveled through Malecón Avenue and 9 de Octubre and ended in the Centenary Park. Since then, the route has not been modified again.

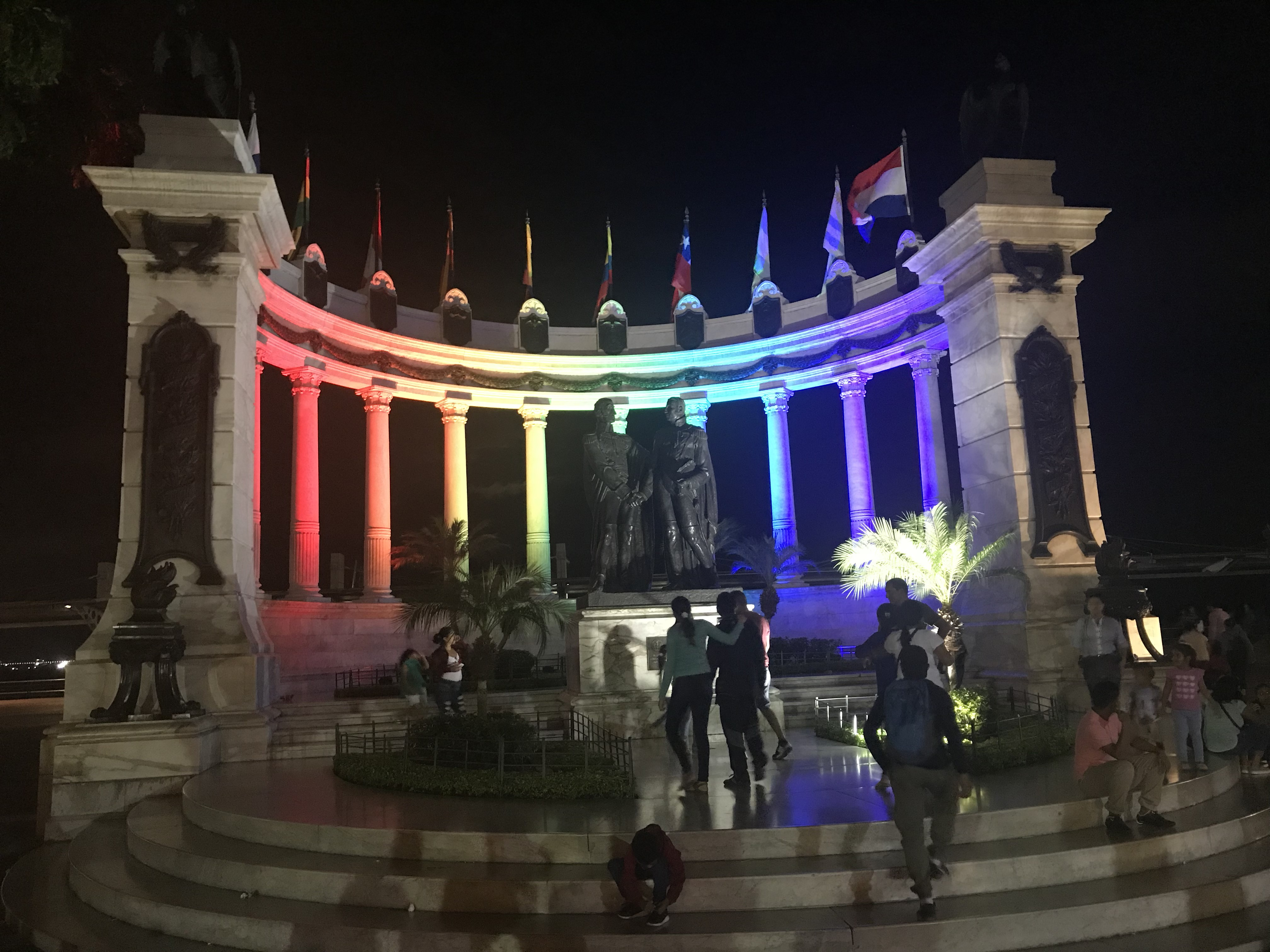
Hemicycle of the Rotunda illuminated with the colors of LGBT pride.

On July 1, 2017, the municipality of the city illuminated three iconic sites of Guayaquil with the colors of the LGBT flag: the Hemiciclo de la Rotonda, the Torre The Point and the La Perla ferris wheel. This happened on the same day of the 2017 Pride March and was held as a commemoration of International LGBT Pride Day. Days later, Mayor Jaime Nebot said that Guayaquil was a city of respect and that having illuminated the sites with the colors of the LGBT flag was a reflection of that position.

Over the years, the number of attendees at the march increased. For 2016 the figure was between 6,000 and 7,000 participants, while by 2018 it had exceeded 9000 people.

The march was canceled in 2020 and 2021 due to the COVID-19 pandemic and resumed in 2022. During that edition, in addition to the march, a platform was installed in the Centennial Park to hold a "Pride Fest" at the end of the parade, in which the LGBT Chamber of Commerce of Ecuador promoted entrepreneurship of queer people.

=== Banning attempt (2023) ===
Attendees of the Guayaquil LGBT Pride March in 2023.

In 2023, the newly elected mayor of Guayaquil, Aquiles Álvarez, denied the authorization to carry out the march on its traditional route and argued that it would lead to an increase in vehicular traffic in the city center. Instead, Álvarez suggested that the march take place in the Samanes Park. LGBT organizations rejected this suggestion and denounced it as an attempt to displace LGBT people by sending them to a sector on the outskirts of the city, which had no guarantees in terms of security or lighting. They also said they were surprised by the refusal considering that the previous mayors had given the permits every year without problems since 2014.

Faced with the mayor's refusal, LGBT organizations announced that they would insist on holding the march in the central streets of the city, due to its emblematic value as a stage for social demonstrations, and based on the freedom to demonstrate and the use of public space guaranteed in the Constitution of Ecuador. In the days before the march, the national government, through the Undersecretariat of Diversity and the National Council for Gender Equality, as well as the Ombudsman's Office, asked Mayor Álvarez to reconsider his position and comply with the constitutional provisions in this regard.

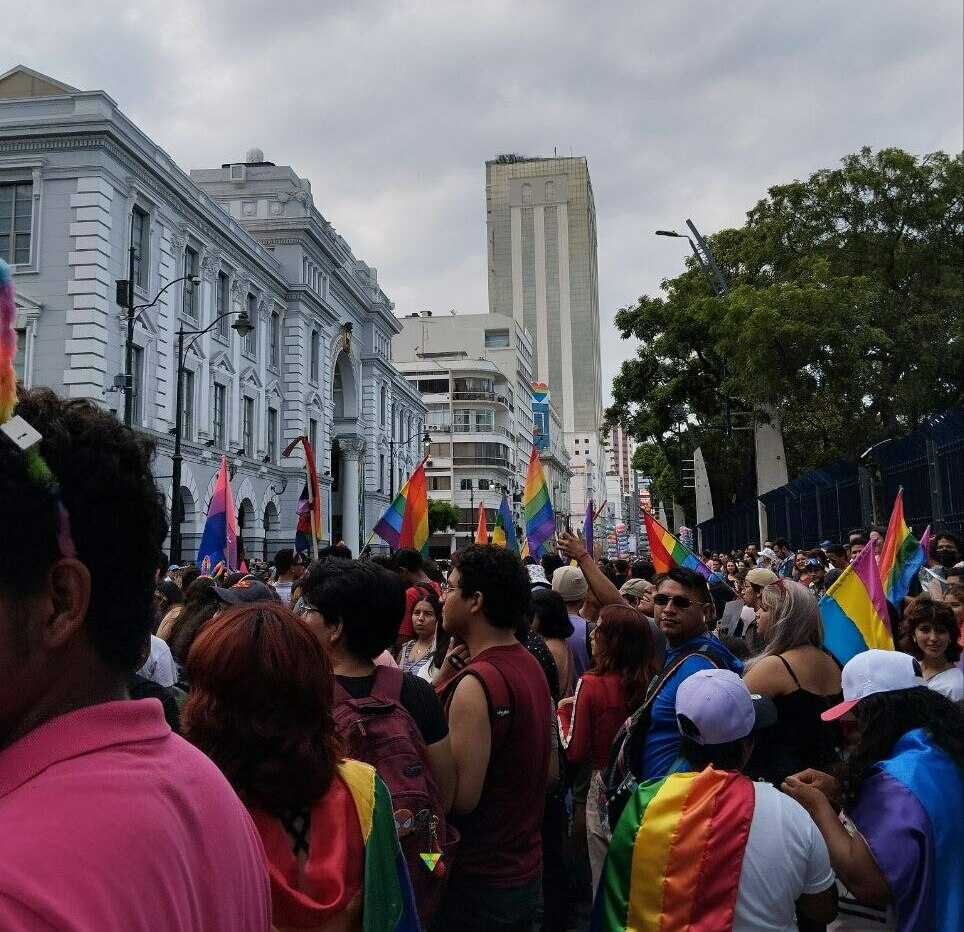
LGBT Pride March 2023

On June 22, a university student filed a recurso de amparo against the mayor's decision, while the LGBT Chamber of Commerce of Ecuador filed another the next day. On the morning of June 28, Mayor Álvarez announced again that he would not give the necessary permits. However, on the afternoon of the same day, Judge Angélica Jimbo issued her ruling for the first amparo and annulled the decision of the mayor's office. In her resolution, the judge allowed the march to take place in the center of the city and demanded that it receive police protection. She also stated that a possible affectation to traffic was not an objective reason to violate constitutional rights.

The march finally took place in the city center on July 1, 2023, as planned. The provincial prefect of Guayas, Marcela Aguiñaga, and activist Diane Rodríguez, led the event. After arriving at the Centennial Park, the march continued towards Plaza Colón, where the platform was installed for the pride festival. Due to the dispute over the granting of authorization to carry out the march in the center, the edition of that year attracted more attendance and attention from citizens in general compared to previous years, with an attendance of almost 40,000 people.

=== Since 2024 ===
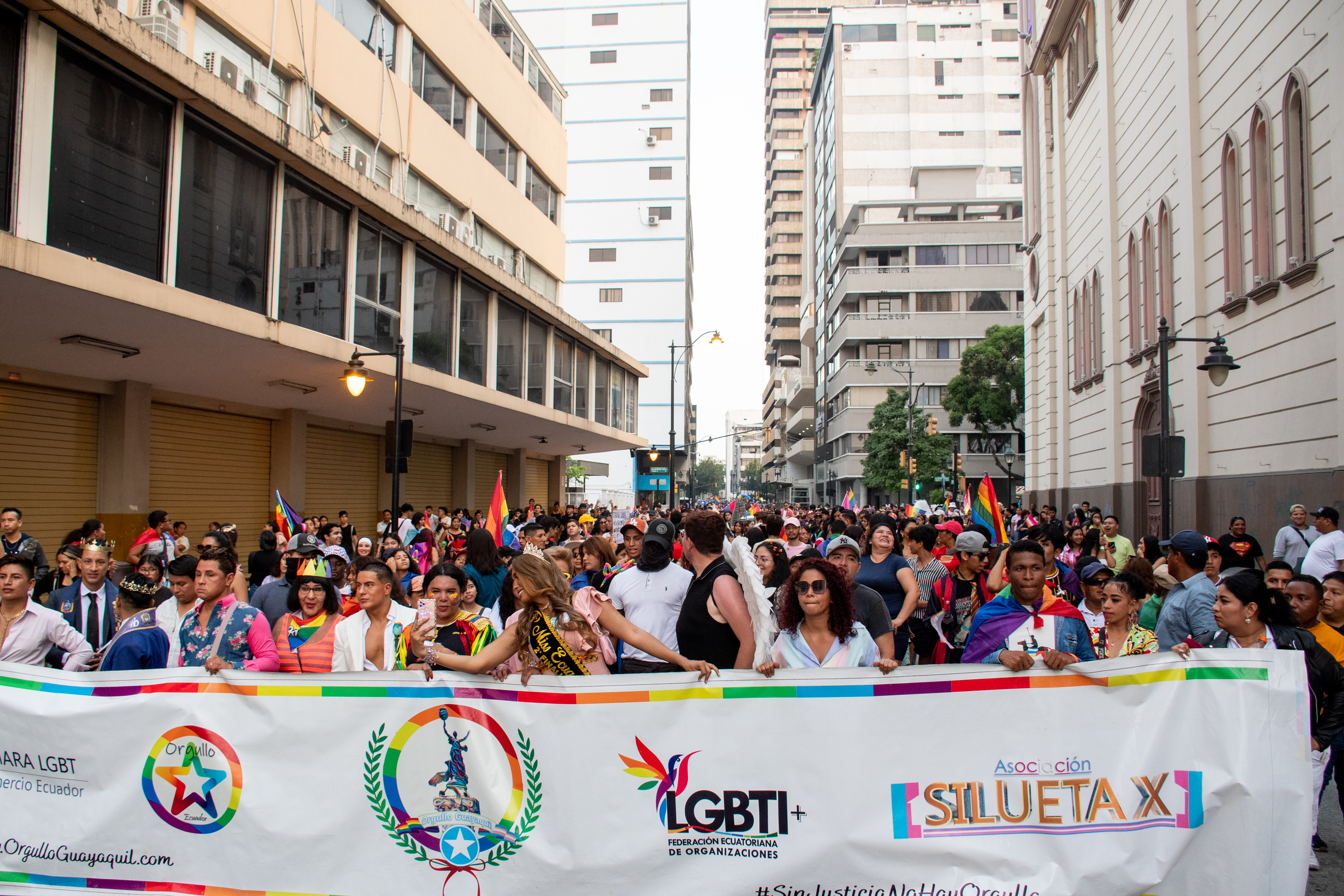
2024 edition of Guayaquil Pride.

Unlike the previous year, the 2024 edition of the march had no problems receiving the corresponding municipal permits for its realization in the city center. The march took place on June 29 and followed the original route until it reached the Centenary Park, then advanced through the streets Lorenzo de Garaycoa, Víctor Manuel Rendón and Pedro Carbo until it ended in Plaza Colón, where the Festival of Love was held in honor of LGBT Pride. The festival featured the participation of artists such as Oveja Negra and Jasú Montero. The march, which reached a turnout of approximately 50,000 people, had among its attendantsw the first lady of Ecuador, Lavinia Valbonesi, who attended the event as a sign of support and said on social networks that there was still a long way to go in terms of equal rights.

== Gallery ==
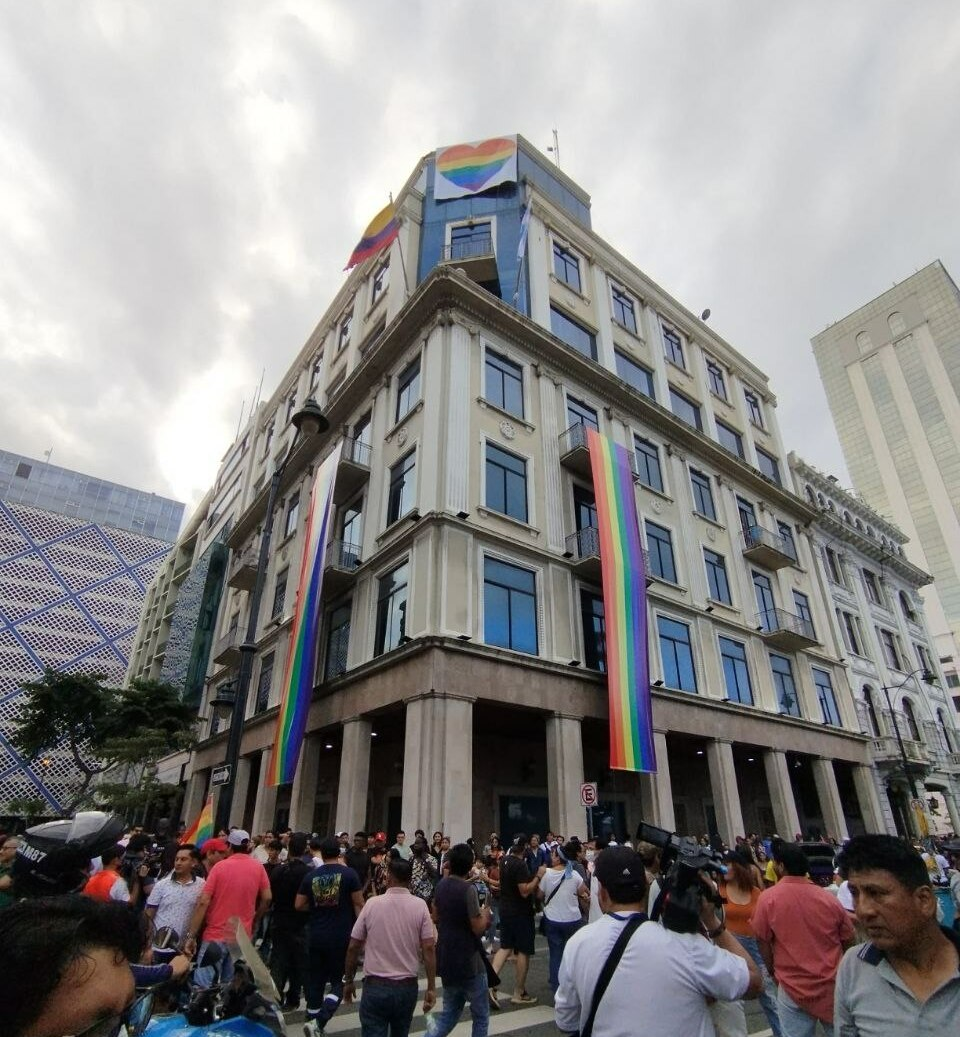
LGBT March 2023

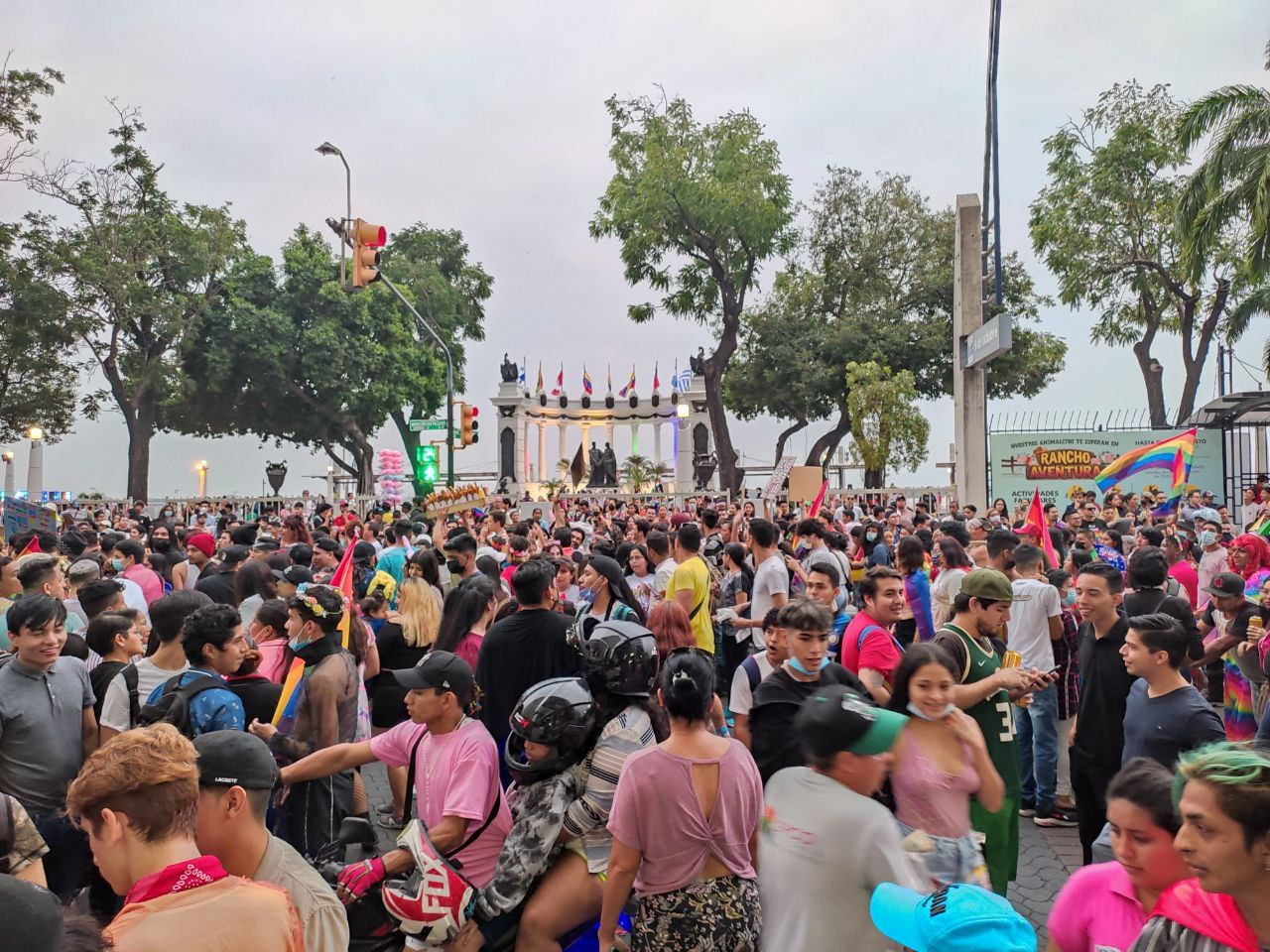
LGBT March 2022

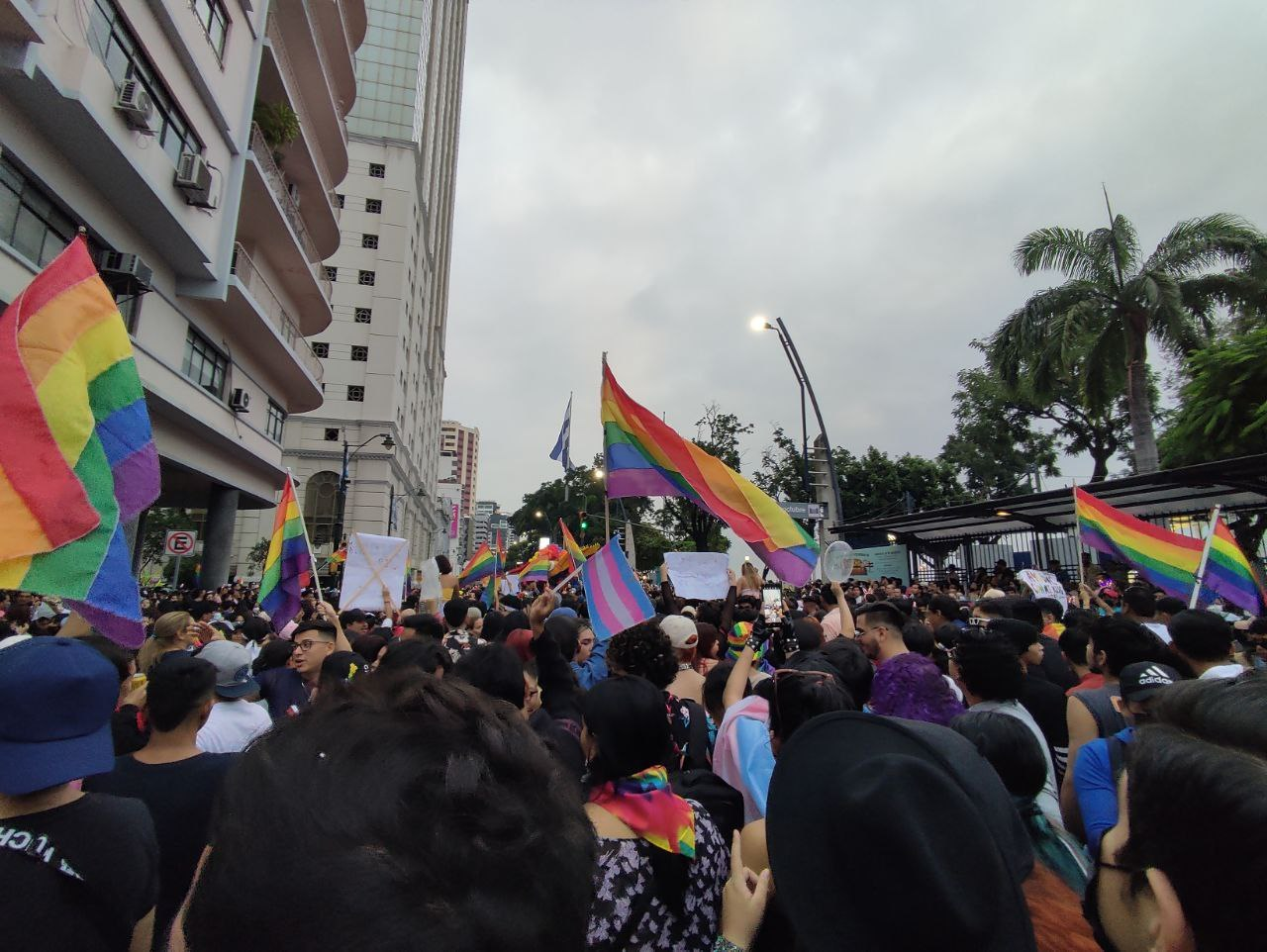
LGBT March 2022

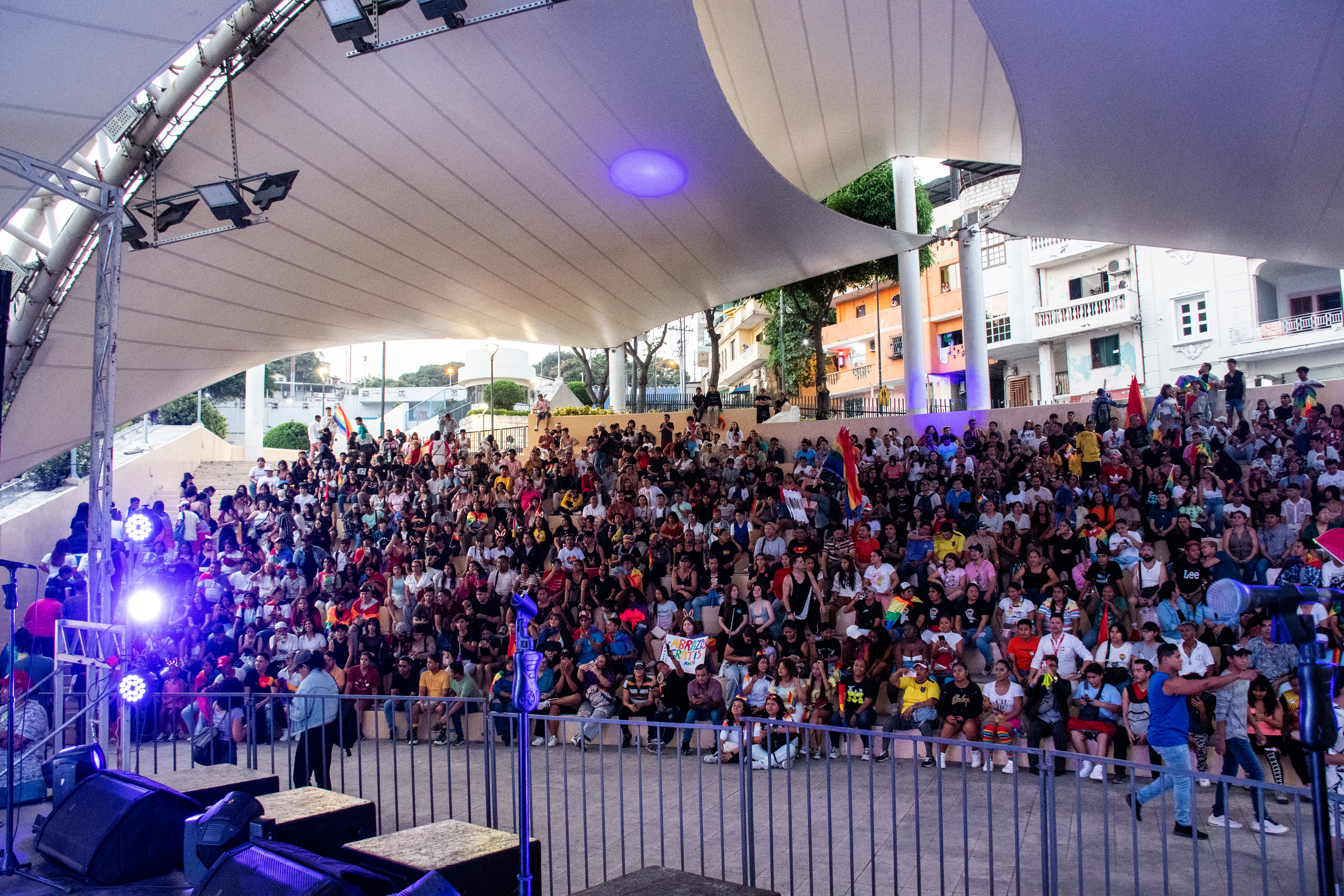
Love Festival 2024

== See also ==
- Quito Pride
- Cuenca Pride
- LGBT pride in Ecuador
- LGBTQIA+ in Guayaquil
