= Thalía Álvarez =

Ecuadorian anthropologist and feminist activist (1962–2011)

- Born: Thalía Álvarez Carvallo; 22 July 1962; Quito, Ecuador
- Died: 22 March 2011 (aged 48); Quito, Ecuador
- Occupation(s): Anthropologist, activist
- Partner: Janneth Peña

Thalía Álvarez Carvallo (1962–2011) was an Ecuadorian anthropologist and feminist activist. She was a member of organizations such as Proyecto Transgénero and Corporación Humanas Ecuador, and was co-founder of the latter. She was also one of the country's first openly lesbian women to be candidates for elected office.

After her death in 2011, her partner, activist Janneth Peña, successfully petitioned the Ecuadorian Institute of Social Security (Instituto Ecuatoriano de Seguridad Social; IESS) to grant her Álvarez's widow's pension benefits, marking a milestone for Ecuadorian same-sex couples.

== Early life and career ==
In 2002, Álvarez joined the organization Proyecto Transgénero, where she supported the creation of Casa Trans. Within the organization she was also a teacher of transfeminist activism.

In 2005, she and fellow feminists founded Corporación Humanas Ecuador. She also worked on several projects on sexual and reproductive health with the Ecuadorian Center for the Promotion and Action of Women. She was a member of Ecuador Adolescente until 2007.

For the 2007 Ecuadorian Constituent Assembly election, Álvarez was a candidate for assembly member for the alliance between the ¡Alfaro Vive, Carajo! and Pachakutik movements, as a representative of lesbian populations, which made her one of the first openly LGBT people to run for elected office in the country. During the work of the Constituent Assembly, she was an LGBT advisor on the preparation of the constitutional text, along with activists such as Elizabeth Vásquez and Sandra Álvarez. Specifically, Thalía Álvarez was an advisor to Assemblywoman María Augusta Calle on the workers' rights panel.

== Death ==
Thalía Álvarez died from pancreatic cancer in Quito on 22 March 2011. Her romantic partner, the activist Janneth Peña, whom Álvarez had met in 2005 and with whom she registered a domestic partnership in 2010, had difficulties completing the procedures to be able to cremate her. These were due to discriminatory policies against lesbian couples, including in the removal of her body from the morgue and the signing of family authorizations at the funeral home.

In August 2011, Peña made a request to the IESS for the montepío (worker's fund) and severance pension that was owed to her as the domestic partner of Álvarez. After a months-long process in which she received several refusals, on 14 December of that year, it was announced that Peña would receive these benefits, marking the first time in the history of the country that a same-sex couple received this recognition. As a result of the case, the IEES announced that from that moment on, other same-sex couples could also benefit.

== See also ==
- Same-sex marriage in Ecuador
