= Barrio Orellana =

Barrio Orellana is a barrio (neighborhood) located in the city of Guayaquil, Ecuador and one of the oldest in the city.

== History ==
It is more than 65 years old. Originally, it was a housing complex aimed at professionals and developed by the Pension Fund (current Ecuadorian Institute of Social Security).

Nowadays, Barrio Orellana is a commercial sector and very transited by vehicles. In its vicinity there are medical centers, financial, hotels, importers, buildings for office rental, ministerial, banking, and educational dependencies.

== Current Situation ==
Today, the Orellana neighborhood is a busy commercial area. Nearby are medical centers, financial institutions, hotels, import companies, office buildings for rent, government offices, banks, and educational institutions.
