= Ecuador National Trans March =

Annual LGBT event in Valencia, Spain

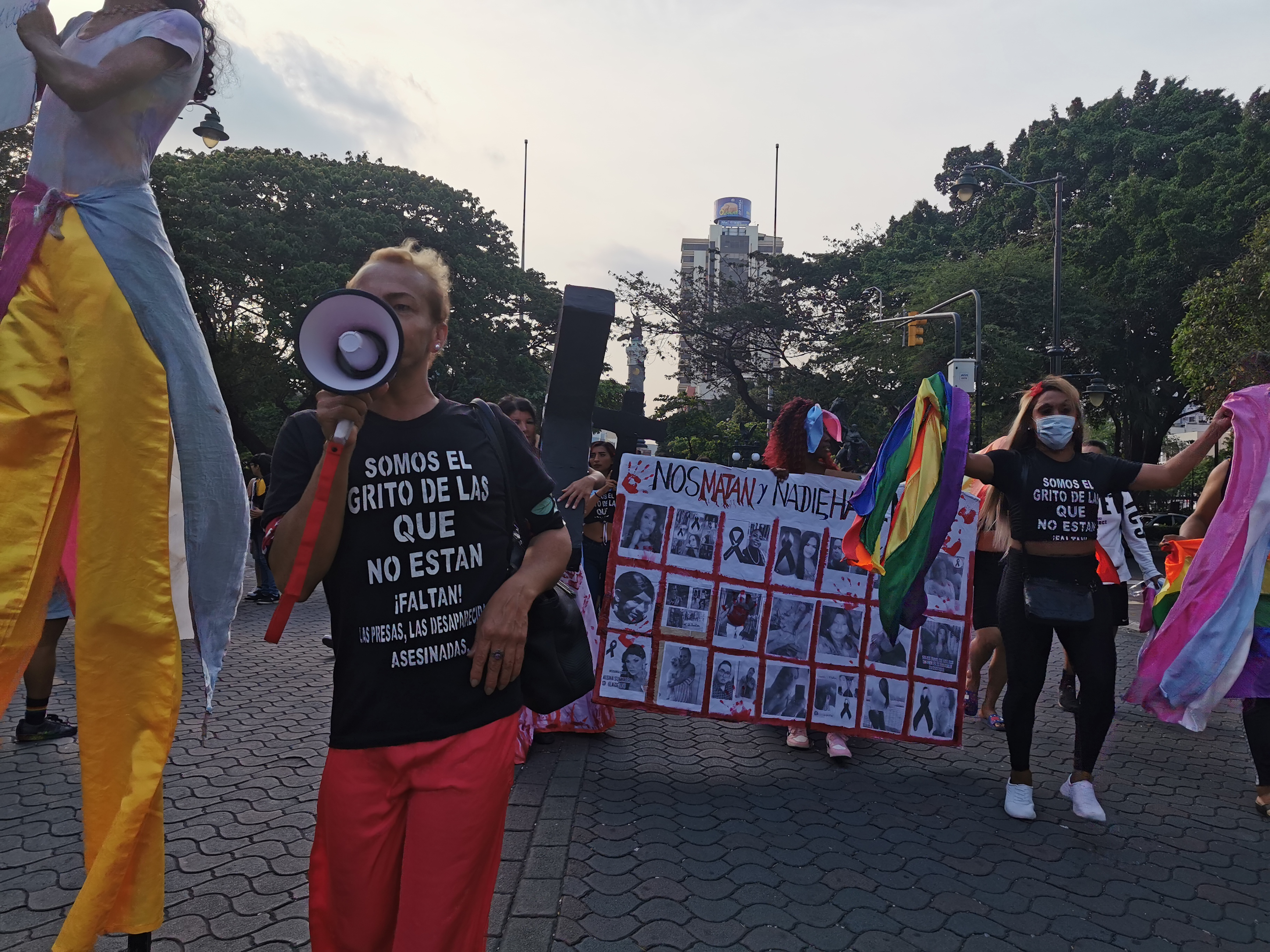
- During the 2023 Ecuador National Trans March in Guayaquil
- Native name: Marcha Nacional Trans de Ecuador
- Date: November
- Location: Ecuador
- Type: Pride festival
- Motive: Transgender Day of Remembrance (28 November)

The Ecuador National Trans March, also known as the Ecuador Trans Pride March, is a pride march held annually in several cities of Ecuador. The march is held in November every year to commemorate the Transgender Day of Remembrance, celebrated annually on 20 November, and the anniversary of the decriminalization of homosexuality in the country, which took place on 27 November 1997.

The first edition was held in 2020, and featured simultaneous marches in Quito and Machala, in addition to a demonstration in Guayaquil. Hundreds of people participated in the third march in Quito.

== History ==
The first Ecuador National Trans March was held on 20 November 2020 on the Transgender Day of Remembrance, and was organized by LGBTQ rights organizations to demand justice, equal rights, and protest against the cases of transphobia experienced by members of the community. In the city of Quito, the march began at Plaza Foch and proceeded to the building that housed the Attorney General's Office. Delegations from several cities of Ecuador including Santo Domingo, Guayaquil, Ambato, Riobamba, Loja, Cuenca, and Esmeraldas joined the march in Quito. Another march was held in the city of Machala, which began at Parque de Los Héroes, and proceeded along Rocafuerte Street towards the building that housed the Prosecutor's Office of El Oro Province. In Guayaquil, a demonstration was held at the city's Centennial Park.

The second edition of the march, which was held on 20 November 2021, concluded at La Alameda Park in Quito. On 27 November of the same year, the first such march was held in Guayaquil.

The third edition of the march took place on 19 November 2022. Hundreds gathered in Quito for a march that departed from the Attorney General's Office and proceeded to the Centro de Arte Contemporáneo (Center for Contemporary Art). In Guayaquil, the march took place on 26 November 2022. It began at Plaza Rocafuerte and ended at the building that housed the Asociación Silueta X (es).

The fourth edition, which in Quito took place on 18 November 2023, had among its demands the cessation of violence by the authorities against sex workers, access to healthcare for trans women, and comprehensive reparation for elderly trans women who survived police persecution during the twentieth century. The fifth edition of the march took place on 20 November 2024 in Guayaquil, and proceeded from the Centennial Park (es) to Plaza San Francisco, and had the improvement of the situation of trans women in the country's prisons as its main demand.
