= Sandra Álvarez =

Ecuadorian politician and LGBT rights activist (born 1967)

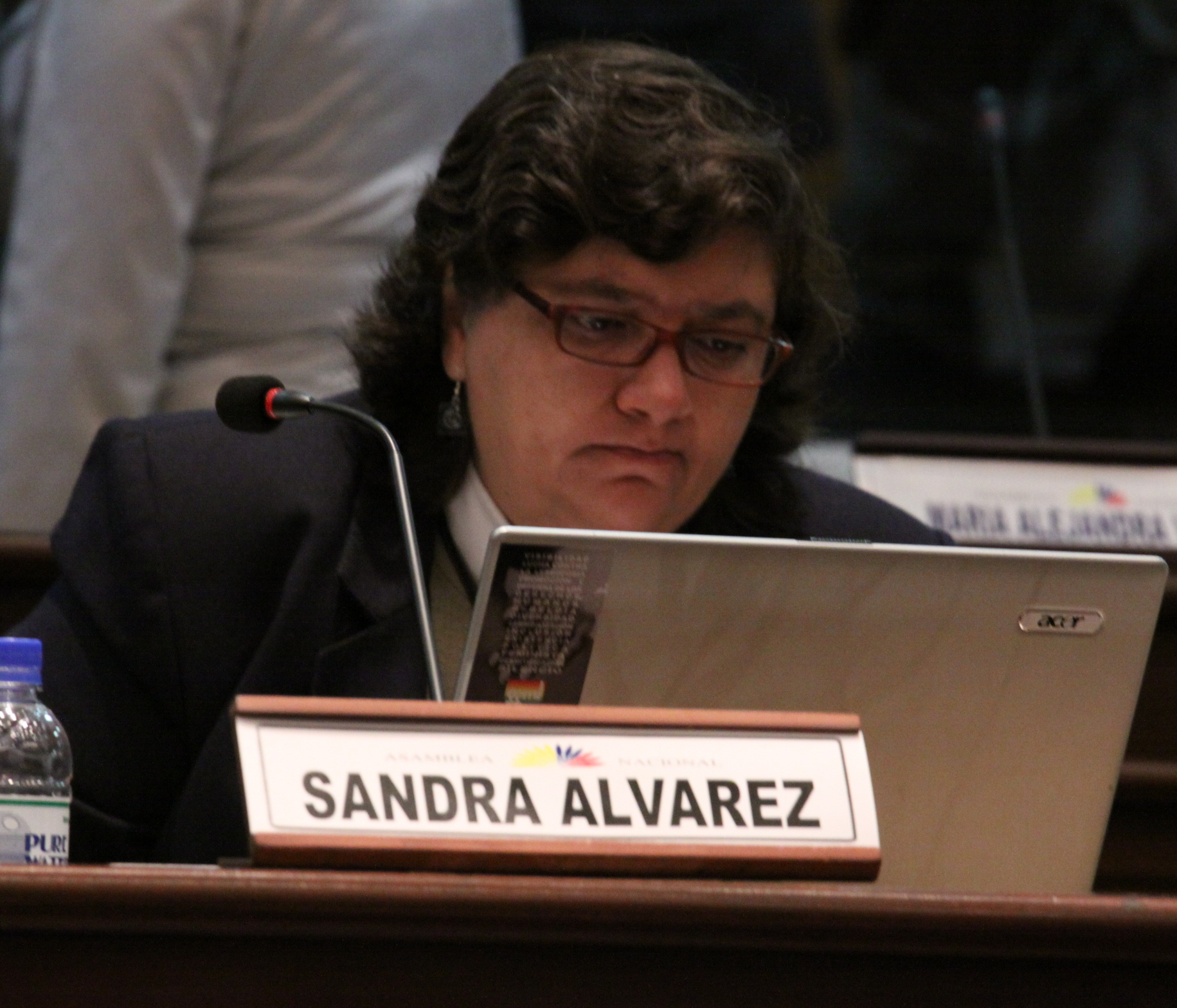
- Álvarez in 2010
- Born: Sandra Cecilia Álvarez Monsalve; May 30, 1967 (age 59); Quito, Ecuador
- Education: Central University of Ecuador
- Occupations: Politician; LGBT rights activist; social communicator
- Partner: Janneth Peña
- Awards: Patricio Brabomalo Award (2016)

Sandra Cecilia Álvarez Monsalve (born May 30, 1967) is an Ecuadorian politician and LGBT rights activist. She founded the Ecuadorian Organization of Lesbian Women, one of the country's first lesbian organizations. In the 2009 legislative elections, Álvarez became the alternate assembly member for Paco Velasco, making her the first openly LGBT person to hold an elected position in Ecuador’s National Assembly.

In 2016, she received the Patricio Brabomalo Award from the Municipality of Quito for her contributions to LGBT rights.

== Early life and education ==
Álvarez Monsalve was born on May 30, 1967, in Quito. She did her secondary studies in a religious school, from which she was expelled in her fifth year when she was accused of being a lesbian. She later earned a degree in social communication from the Central University of Ecuador.

== Career and activism ==
In 2000, Álvarez Monsalve joined the feminist organization Coordinadora Política de Mujeres Ecuatorianas to work as a social communicator, which marked her beginning as a feminist activist. When the Coordinator initiated an election for a leadership position in the organization, Álvarez ran and was elected. However, she suffered homophobic discrimination by other members of the organization due to her sexual orientation, including accusations of harassment, and the fact that her partner joined the same organization to work as an accountant.

After this experience, Álvarez Monsalve decided to create an organization that focused on defending the rights of lesbian women and helped make them visible, so, together with her partner, Janneth Peña, and other women, she founded in June 2002 the Ecuadorian Organization of Lesbian Women (OEML), which became one of the first lesbian organizations in the country. The OEML obtained its legal personality in April 2003 and since then, Álvarez has remained as executive director of the organization.

During the operation of the Constituent Assembly of Ecuador of 2007 and 2008, Álvarez was present in the process of preparing the constitutional text, as coordinator of the group of women's organizations that had brought recommendations for the article. Years later, Álvarez Monsalve said that the Assembly did not meet the expectations of women's and LGBT groups for trying not to make religious groups uncomfortable.

For the 2009 legislative elections, she was elected alternate assemblyman of legislator Paco Velasco representing Pichincha Province, which made her the first openly LGBT person to be elected to a position in the National Assembly in the history of Ecuador.

== Personal life ==
Despite early suspicions of her own sexuality, when she was younger, Álvarez believed herself to be heterosexual. It was at age 20 that she first accepted her sexuality and came out as a lesbian to others. In 1993, she began a relationship with Janneth Peña. After maintaining a long-distance relationship for several years, she moved to Cuenca with her. In 1997, Peña's family discovered their relationship and violently assaulted them in a homophobic attack. When they attempted to report the incident, police nearly arrested them, as homosexuality was still a crime in Ecuador at the time. Eventually, she moved with Peña to Quito.

== Recognition ==
On June 20, 2016, the Municipality of Quito named her the winner of that year's edition of the Patricio Brabomalo Award for her work in favor of the rights of LGBT populations.

== See also ==
- LGBTQ rights in Ecuador
- List of LGBTQ rights activists
- List of the first openly LGBTQ holders of political offices
