= Corporación Kimirina =

Ecuadorian nonprofit organization

Kimirina Corporation is an Ecuadorian nonprofit organization focused on HIV prevention and treatment. with an emphasis on LGBT populations. It is considered one of the most successful foundations in the region in terms of HIV prevention.

The organization has offices in the cities of Quito, Guayaquil, Machala, Portoviejo, Santa Elena and Santo Domingo. It has signed agreements with institutions such as the Municipality of Guayaquil, the Ministry of Public Health and the French Embassy in Ecuador.

The organization obtained legal status in December 1999 and is directed by Dr. Amira Herdoíza. Other notable people who have worked at Kimirina include LGBT activists Orlando Montoya and León Sierra Páez. Kimirina's name is a Quechuan word meaning "to walk or work together."

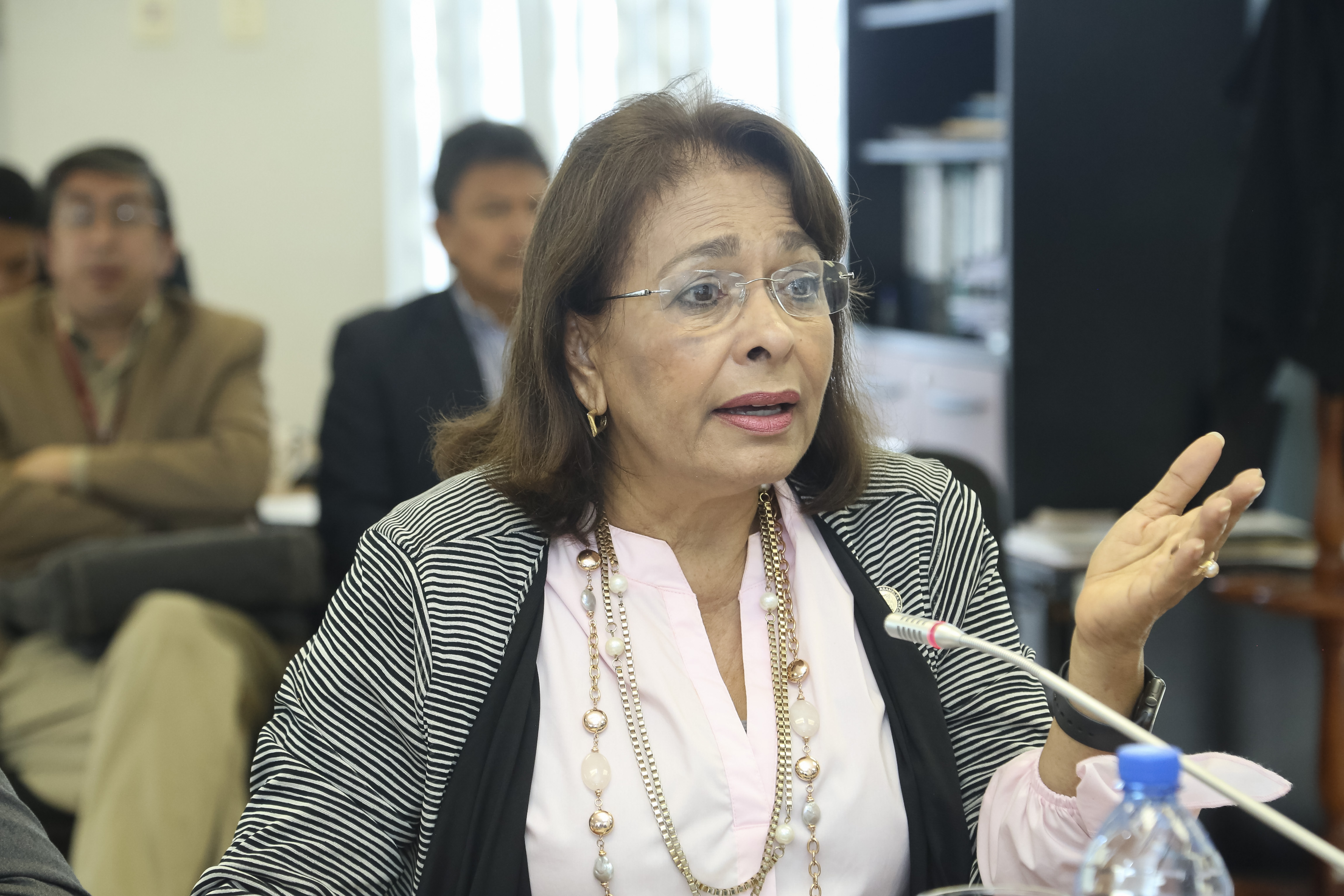
Amira Herdoíza, executive director of Kimirina, speaking before the Health Commission of Ecuador's National Assembly in 2019.

== Services ==
The organization offers talks and workshops on sexual health and the prevention of sexually transmitted diseases. In their offices they offer free HIV tests, and they have mobile testing points in cities such as Guayaquil.

In 2019, it became one of the first organizations in Ecuador to provide HIV pre-exposure prophylaxis (PrEP) treatment through a pilot program, which reached 200 treatment users in the Costa Region by 2022.

Kimirina also participates in events related to sexual diversity, such as the LGBTI Contranatura Arts exhibition and the creation of the LGBT comic strip "Víctor Victoria." They have also participated in organizing the Quito LGBT Pride March.
