= Lira Villalva =

Ecuadorian lawyer and politician

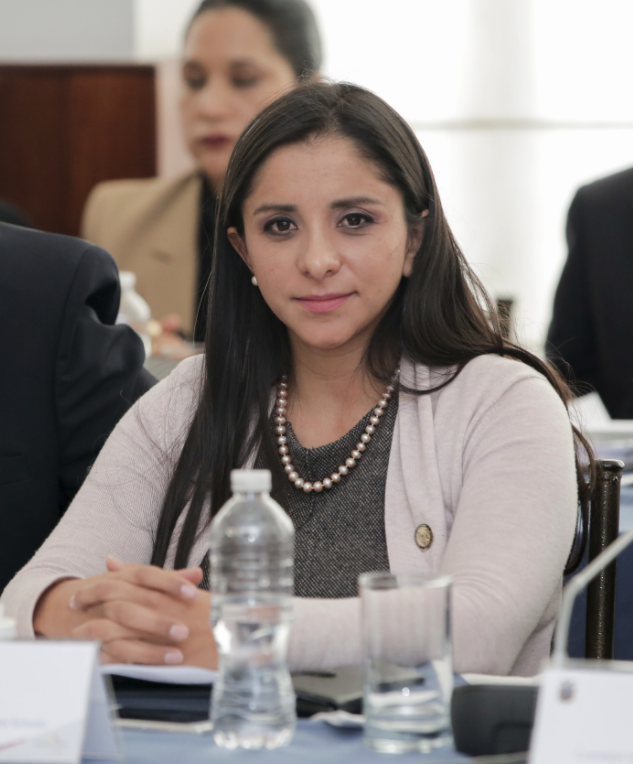
Villalva in 2017

Lira de la Paz Villalva Miranda (born 1983) is an Ecuadorian lawyer and politician who was the first woman to be appointed the post of governor of the Tungurahua Province. She served as a national assemblyman from 2017 to 2021.

== Biography ==
Villalva was born in 1983 in the community of Pillaro in the Tungurahua Province. She was educated at the Ambato and La Salle colleges and later went on to study at the Central University of Ecuador where she graduated with a law degree. Villalva's political career began when she became part of the University Feminine Association and as a Latin American delegate in the Socialist International. In 2009, she joined the political party PAIS Alliance. For the seasonal elections of Ecuador held that same year, Villalva was elected the cantonal councillor of Pillaro. She was appointed the governor of Tungurahua in December 2012, and her appointment to the posting made her the first woman to hold that particular office. Villalva resigned the governorship in November 2016 so she could participate in the legislative elections for the following year, in which she was elected a national assemblyman to represent Tungurahua for the political movement PAIS Alliance.
