= Eva García =

Eva García may refer to:

- Eva García Fabre (born 1953), Ecuadorian diplomat and politician
- Eva García Pastor (born 1976), Andorran politician
- Eva García Sempere (born 1976), Spanish politician
