= 2002 Ecuadorian general election =

Presidential and congressional elections

- Presidential election
- 20 October 2002 (first round); 24 November 2002 (second round)
- Registered: 8,154,425
- Turnout: 64.98% (first round); 71.21% (second round)
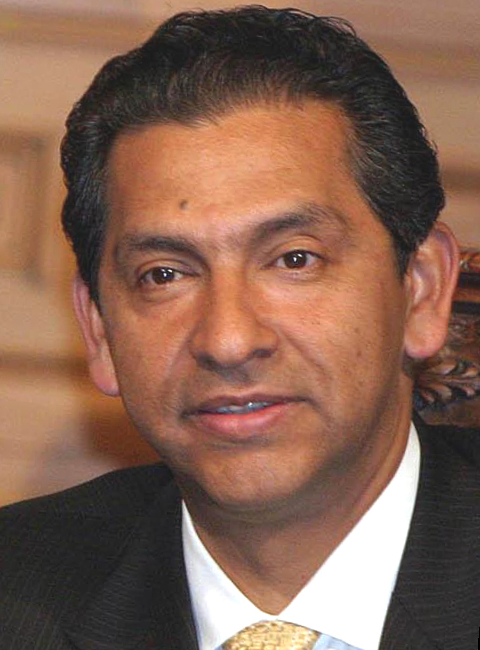

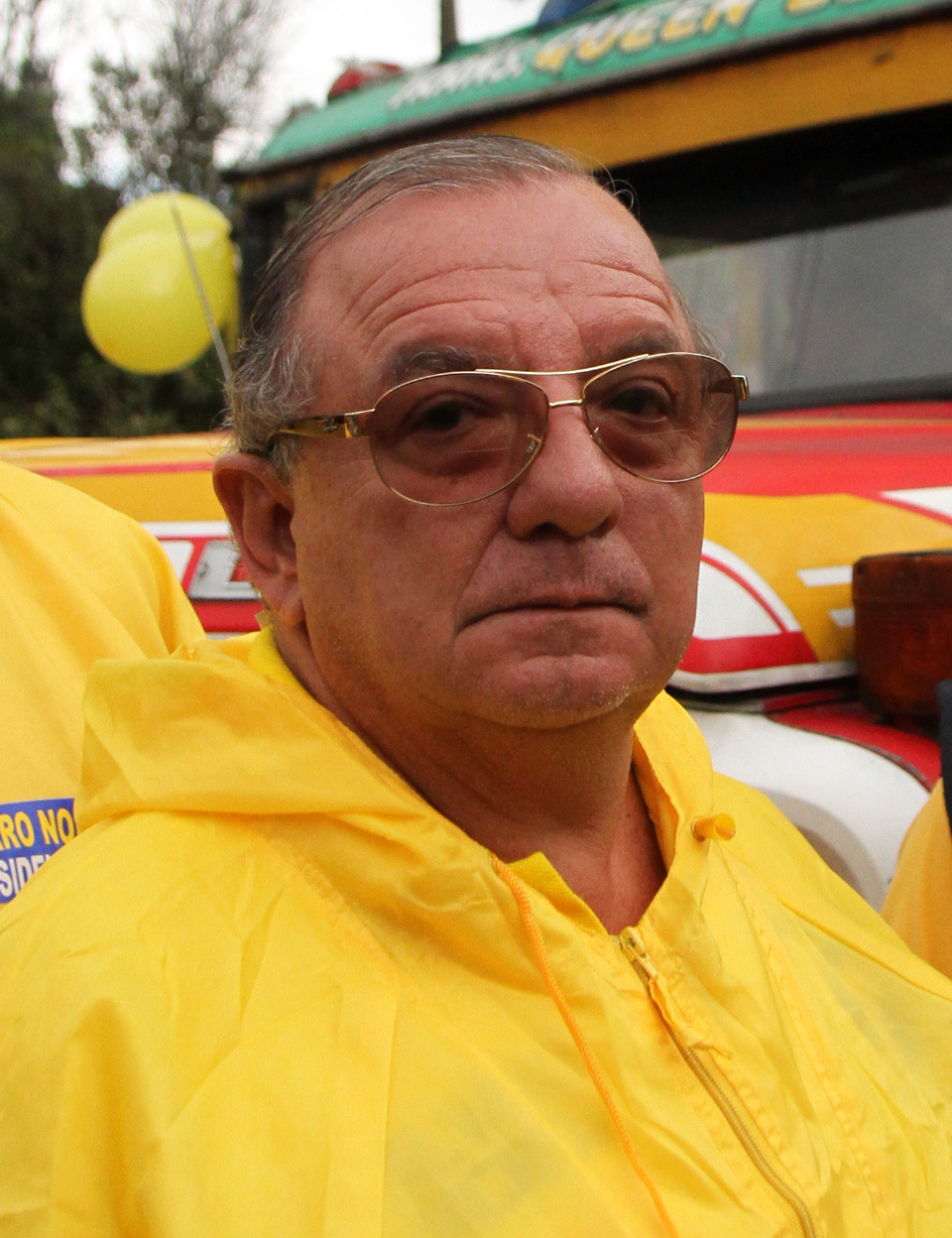
Nominee	Lucio Gutiérrez	Álvaro Noboa
Party	PSP	PRIAN
Running mate	Alfredo Palacio	Marcelo Cruz
Popular vote	2,803,243	2,312,854
Percentage	54.79%	45.21%
President before election
Gustavo Noboa
Democracia Popular
Elected President
Lucio Gutiérrez
PSP

General elections were held in Ecuador on 20 October 2002, with a second round of the presidential elections on 24 November. The result was a victory for Lucio Gutiérrez of the PSP–MUPP–NP alliance, who won the run-off with 54.8% of the vote. The Social Christian Party emerged as the largest party in the National Congress, winning 24 of the 100 seats.

== Results ==
=== President ===
Candidate	Running mate	Party	First round		Second round	
Candidate	Running mate	Party	Votes	%	Votes	%
Lucio Gutiérrez	Alfredo Palacio	PSP–MUPP–NP	943,123	20.64	2,803,243	54.79
Álvaro Noboa	Vicente Taiano	Institutional Renewal Party of National Action	794,614	17.39	2,312,854	45.21
León Roldós Aguilera	Dolores Padilla	Citizen Force Movement	703,593	15.40		
Rodrigo Borja Cevallos	Eva García	Democratic Left	638,142	13.97		
Xavier Neira	Álvaro Pérez	Social Christian Party	553,106	12.11		
Jacobo Bucaram	Frank Vargas Pazzos	Ecuadorian Roldosist Party	544,688	11.92		
Jacinto Velazquez	Patricio Larrea	Independent Social Transformation Movement	169,311	3.71		
Ivonne Baki	César Frixone	PLRE–Metamorfosis	79,598	1.74		
César Alarcón	Universi Zambrano	Freedom Party	54,793	1.20		
Osvaldo Hurtado	Gloria Gallardo	Solidarity Fatherland Movement	49,043	1.07		
Antonio Vargas	Modesto Vela	Independent Amauta Jatari Movement	39,171	0.86		
Total			4,569,182	100.00	5,116,097	100.00
Valid votes			4,569,182	86.23	5,116,097	88.10
Invalid/blank votes			729,399	13.77	691,012	11.90
Total votes			5,298,581	100.00	5,807,109	100.00
Registered voters/turnout			8,154,425	64.98	8,154,425	71.21
Source: Nohlen

=== National Congress ===
Party	Seats
Social Christian Party	24
Popular Democracy–Christian Democratic Union	19
Democratic Left	13
Institutional Renewal Party of National Action	10
PSP–MUPP	6
Pachakutik Plurinational Unity Movement – New Country	5
Democratic People's Movement	3
Patriotic Society Party	2
PSFA–MUPP	2
MPD–PSFA	2
AN–PSFA–DPUDC	1
Concentration of People's Forces	1
Democratic Left–DPUDC	1
Democratic Left–MCNP	1
Democratic Left–MIRE	1
Democratic Transformation	1
Freedom Party	1
MUPP–MCNP	1
Provincial Integration Movement	1
Socialist Party – Broad Front of Ecuador	1
PSP–MPD	1
Social Christian Party–AN	1
Solidarity Fatherland Movement	1
UN–PSC	1
Total	100
Source: Córdova
