= Nebraska Montenegro =

Ecuadorian LGBTQ+ rights activist (born 1955)

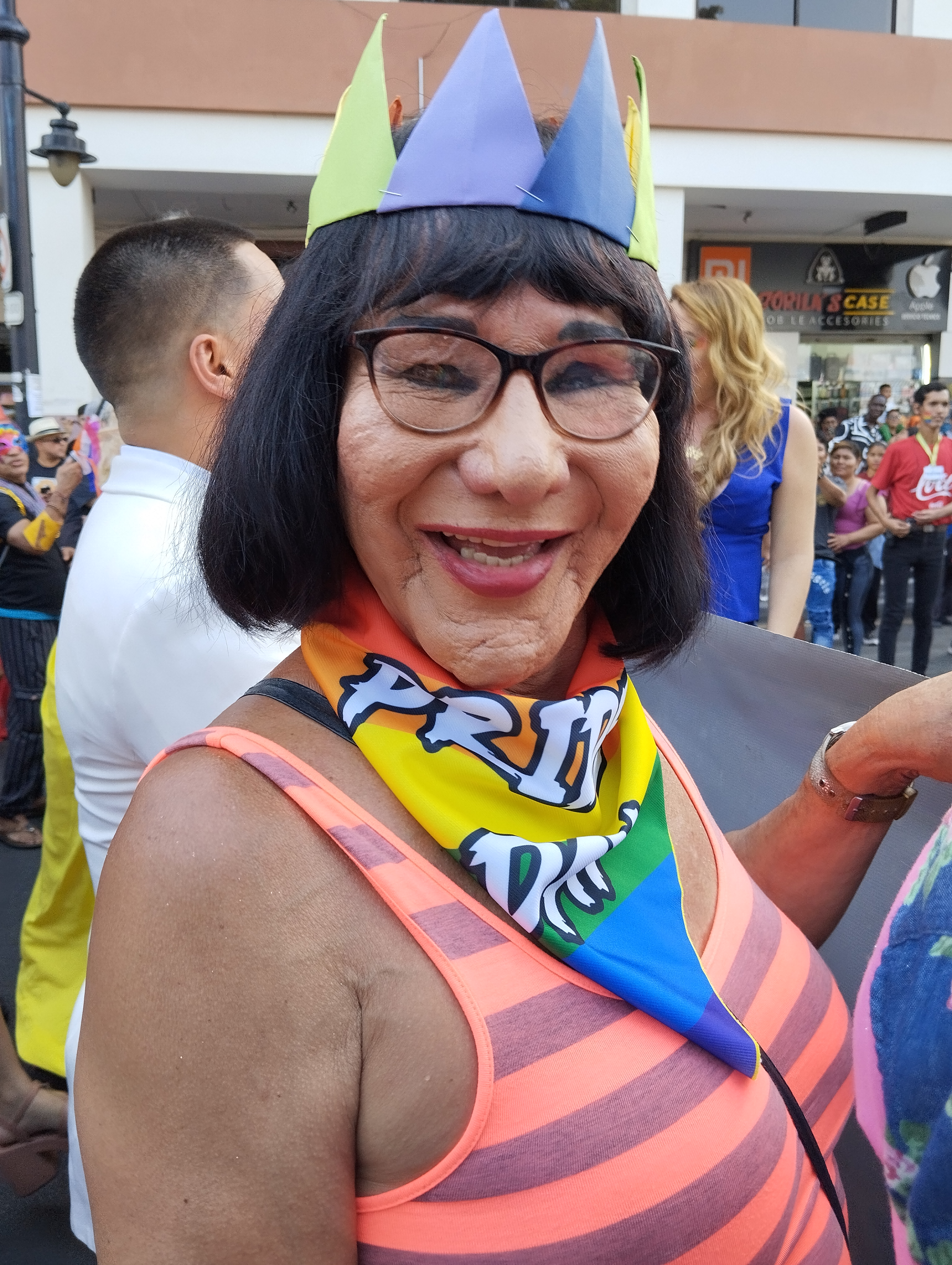
- Montenegro in 2024
- Born: Kerly Nebraska León Gurumendi; 1955 (age 69–70); Guayaquil, Ecuador
- Occupation: LGBTQ+ activist
- Awards: Patricio Brabomalo Award (2023)

Kerly Nebraska León Gurumendi (born 1955), more commonly known as Nebraska Montenegro, is an Ecuadorian LGBTQ rights activist. She was an activist for the decriminalization of homosexuality in Ecuador, which occurred in 1997, and is the current president of the Nueva Coccinelle Foundation, formed by members of the former Coccinelle Association.

Her activism has earned her awards such as the Patricio Brabomalo Award, which was awarded to her by the municipality of Quito in 2023.

== Life and career ==
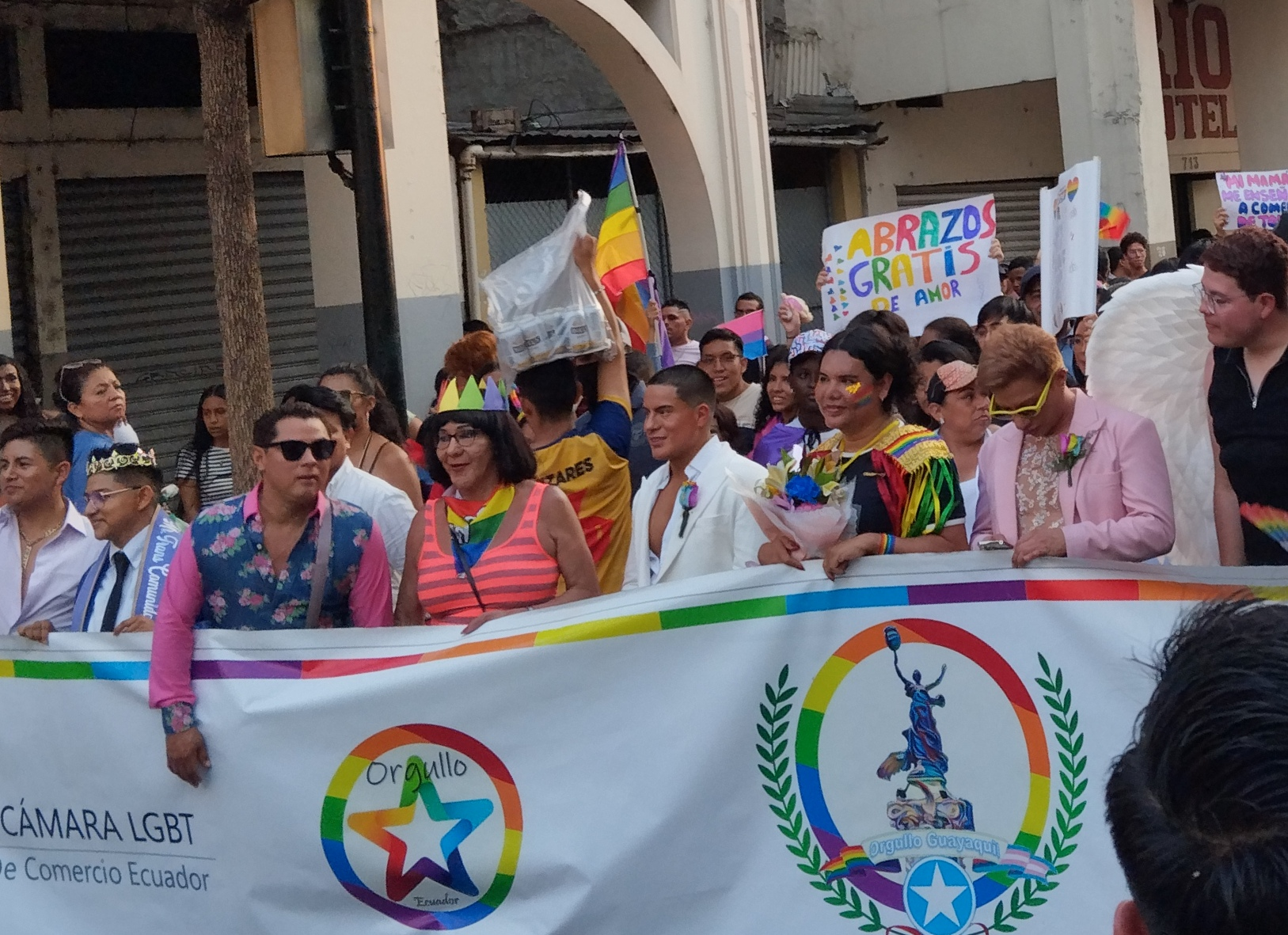
Montenegro during the 2024 Guayaquil LGBT Pride March.

Montenegro was orphaned at 15. She began working, intending to complete her secondary education at the César Borja Lavayen School. At 20, she moved to Quito, where she joined a group of transgender women who were engaged in sex work in El Ejido Park.

She worked for several years in the La Mariscal sector, where, starting in the 1980s, transgender women and transvestites began to suffer persecution and abuse from the authorities. Montenegro herself was detained several times by the police, who demanded money in exchange for not being locked up in cells with dangerous criminals.

Later, she began studying hairdressing at the Ecuador Beauty Academy and became a pupil of Orlando Montoya, a Colombian stylist and LGBTQ activist who created some of the first LGBTQ organizations in the history of Ecuador. She later opened her own hair salon.

In 1997, she joined the Coccinelle Association and, as a member, participated in the fight to decriminalize homosexuality in Ecuador, which, until 1997, was considered a crime punishable by up to eight years. The campaign was successful, and on November 25, 1997, the Constitutional Court declared the law unconstitutional, thus decriminalizing homosexuality.

In 2019, Montenegro and other Coccinelle survivors joined together to form the New Coccinelle Foundation, with Montenegro as its president. The organization filed a lawsuit against the Ecuadorian State for crimes against humanity on May 17 of the same year, within the framework of the International Day Against Homophobia and Transphobia, for the abuses committed by the police against LGBT people between 1980 and 2000. Montenegro was one of the main proponents of the lawsuit, seeking justice and helping to restore the historical memory of abused LGBT people. However, as of June 2023, the lawsuit had not progressed.

On November 27, 2023, the mayor of Quito, Pabel Muñoz, awarded Montegro the Patricio Brabomalo Award for her work supporting LGBTQ rights in the city. During the celebration of the recognition, Montenegro demanded that the authorities provide assistance for elderly transgender people and the creation of a shelter for them.

== Books ==
- Lobato, Fredy, ed. (2023). Cuéntame una historia. Despenalización de la homosexualidad en Ecuador. Fundación Ecuatoriana Equidad. ISBN 978-9942-7154-0-1.
