= Causana =

Ecuadorian lesbian organization

Causana Integral Human Development Foundation
- Fundación de Desarrollo Humano Integral Causana
- Established: 2002
- Type: Non-governmental organization
- Headquarters: Quito, Ecuador
- Fields: LGBT rights

Causana Integral Human Development Foundation (Spanish: Fundación de Desarrollo Humano Integral Causana) is an Ecuadorian lesbian feminist organization founded in 2002 that focuses on advancing the rights of LGBT people in Ecuador, with particular emphasis on issues affecting lesbian women. It was one of the first lesbian organizations in the country, and its name derives from the Quechua word meaning "life".

Among its founders and directors have been prominent figures in Ecuadorian LGBT activism, including Ana Lucía Barragán, Patricio Brabomalo, Carina Vance, and Leticia Rojas. Its headquarters are located in Quito.

== History ==
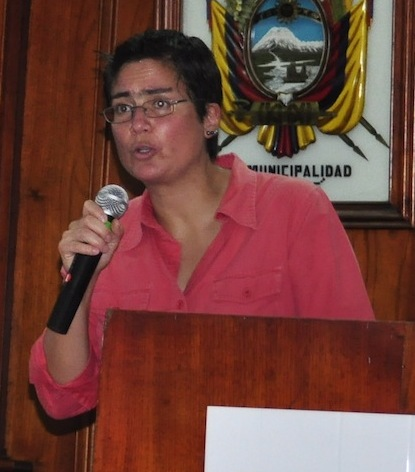
Carina Vance, former director of Causana.

Among the activities organized by the group during its early years were recreational activities for its members, including football matches for lesbian women. The organization also took over the responsibility for organizing national meetings of lesbian women. Over time, the foundation increasingly focused on political advocacy and the promotion and recognition of LGBT rights in Ecuador.

One of the principal areas of action of the foundation has been the denunciation of so-called "dehomosexualization clinics", institutions where LGBT people were subjected to torture and other forms of abuse in attempts to change their sexual orientation. As part of this initiative, Causana reported cases involving lesbian women who had been confined in such detention facilities, as well as organizations that promoted these practices such as Exodus International.

In 2012, activist and former director of Causana, Carina Vance, was appointed as the Minister of Health of Ecuador and pledged to continue efforts to close these clinics. Shortly after her appointment, the ministry conducted raids on three clinics near Quito and rescued dozens of women.

On 8 March 2016, the radionovela Mariana sí es lesbiana premiered on Radio Pública. Produced by Causana, it was the first radio programme in Ecuador with a lesbian theme. The script was written by writer María Auxiliadora Balladares and was based on testimonies collected by the foundation from 24 lesbian women concerning their experiences during the period surrounding the decriminalisation of homosexuality in the country.

The foundation has also organised artistic exhibitions in Quito against homophobia. It has also supported the mothers involved in the Satya case, in which a lesbian couple sought legal recognition by the Ecuadorian government as the legitimate parents of their daughter.

== See also ==
- LGBTQ history in Ecuador
