= Xavier Neira Menéndez =

Ecuadorian politician

Xavier Neira Menéndez (born 25 July 1947) is an Ecuadorian economist, politician, and member of the Social Christian Party (PSC).

In August 1984, Neira was appointed Minister of Industry, a position he held for 33 months, when a scandal involving the Ecuahospital ended the government. In the aftermath, Neira moved to Miami, Florida, to avoid an arrest warrant. He lived in the United States for three years until he was acquitted of all corruption charges by the Supreme Court of Ecuador.

Neira joined the Social Christian Party (PSC) in 1993 and returned to politics. He was elected to the National Congress in 1994 and re-elected in 1998, ultimately serving in Congress from 1994 until 2002.

Neira was the PSC nominee for President of Ecuador in the 2002 presidential election. Neira picked Álvaro Pérez Intriago, a former Mayor of Quito, as his running mate of Vice President. Neira placed fifth in the first round of presidential election with 553,106 votes, or 12.1%. He did not advance to the presidential runoff, which was won by Lucio Gutiérrez.
