= Luisa Delgadillo =

Ecuadorian news presenter

Luisa Marieta Delgadillo Cobos (Guayaquil, June 16, 1969) is an Ecuadorian news presenter who worked for the RTS channel from 1994 to 2024.

== Life ==
Luisa Marieta Delgadillo Cobos was born on June 16, 1969, in the city of Guayaquil, Ecuador. She studied at the Escuela Letras y Vida and at the Colegio Nacional de Misses Dolores Sucre in Guayaquil, and after completing her secondary studies, at the age of 17, she had her first work experience in radio where her father, Luis Delgadillo Avilés, directed a space on Radio América, there Luisa stayed for a short period of five months, with an agricultural theme, this experience served her later in her career, learning about broadcasting and agricultural topics. It was at the age of 19, when her father was editor of a newspaper in Guayaquil, that she decided to follow in his footsteps in communications.

== Career ==
=== In the Television ===
She had a closer approach to television with her second job, where she worked as a reporter for a production company run by Gloria Gallardo, which was owned by businessman Luis Noboa Naranjo. Her first coverage with a camera was at this production company and her reports dealt with agricultural issues, in which she included her voice, thanks to the experience obtained in her first job in radio.

She went on to work on national television for the Telecentro channel, after Gloria Gallardo was assigned as national news director of said media and brought her to work there. There Luisa worked for two years, again dealing with issues related to agriculture, since at that time news about said agricultural sector was very current.

She then went on to work for the TV channel Telesistema, as the host of La Feria de la Alegría for a short period of time, alongside Carla Sala and Marco Vinicio Bedoya. She then established herself as a news reporter for the channel and presenter of the program La Noticia al despertar from 5:50 to 7:30 in the morning, where she has remained for more than 30 years in said medium, which changed its name to RTS.

When she had been practicing journalism empirically for about seven years, she resumed her studies thanks to the semi-presential regime agreement for five years with the National Federation of Journalists, where she obtained the degree of Bachelor of Social Communication at the National University of Loja.

She also works as an interviewer for radio Élite 99.7 FM, public relations for the Association of Banana Exporters of Ecuador and is one of the collaborators of the institutional magazine Bananotas.

== Personal life ==
One of her passions is the music, which she would have dedicated herself to if she had not been a journalist. She has a son named Carlos Aníbal, who is studying to be a lawyer.

On March 25, 2020, it was announced that Luisa Delgadillo was infected with the COVID-19 disease, caused by the SARS-CoV-2 virus, during the 2020 coronavirus disease pandemic in Ecuador. She started with a throat condition, leading to fever, headache, chills, and general malaise, until she had two crises where she felt her chest was closing, which did not allow her to breathe and led her to think that she would not wake up alive. When she underwent the COVID-19 test and tested positive, she was told that if she has this coronavirus, it is certain that the people around her also have it, such as her son Carlos Aníbal, a niece and a godmother at that time, so Luisa stated that it would not be necessary for them to take the test, in the meantime they remain isolated.

Left the TV channel on August 15, 2024.
