= Pabel Muñoz =

Mayor of Quito since 2023

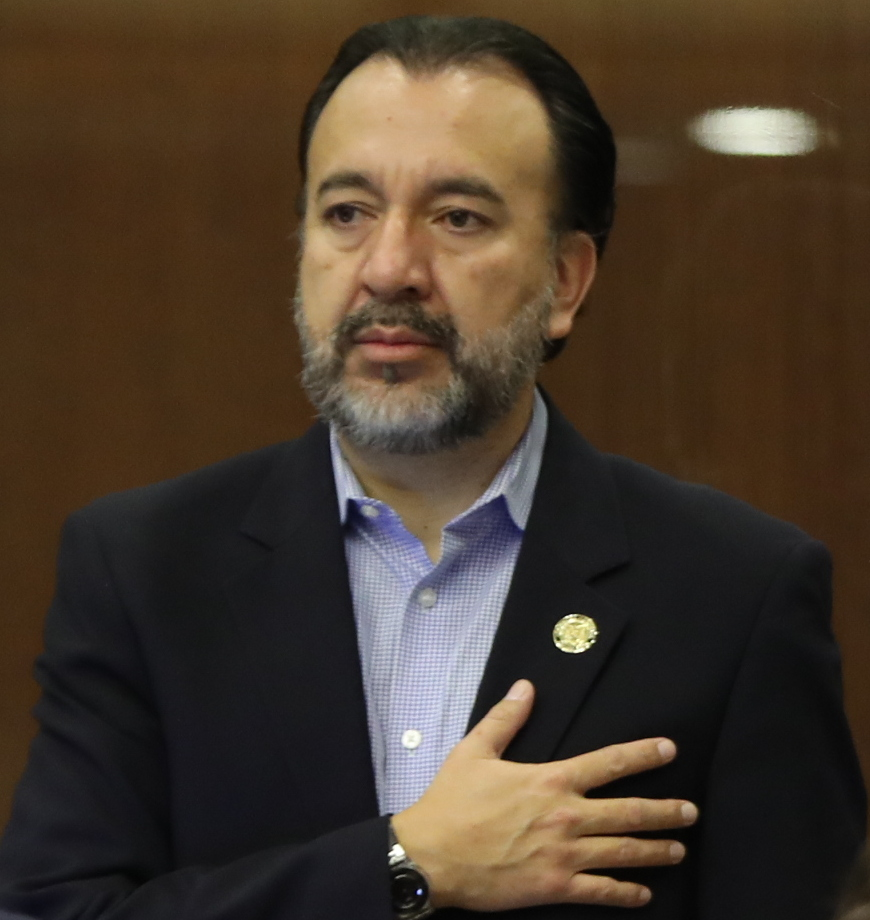
- Muñoz in 2022

Metropolitan Mayor of Quito
- Incumbent
- Assumed office 14 May 2023
- Preceded by: Santiago Guarderas

Member of the Ecuadorian National Assembly (for district 1 of Pichincha)
- In office 14 May 2017 – 8 September 2022
- Succeeded by: Jahiren Noriega

National Secretary of Planning and Development of Ecuador
- In office 13 August 2013 – 15 October 2015
- President: Rafael Correa
- Preceded by: Fander Falconí
- Succeeded by: Sandra Naranjo

Personal details
- Born: 6 September 1975 (age 51) Quito, Ecuador
- Party: Citizen Revolution Movement (since 2018)
- Other political affiliations: Mover (2006–2018)

Christian Pabel Muñoz López (born 6 September 1975) is an Ecuadorian politician, sociologist, and academic who has served as the Mayor of Quito since 14 May 2023.

== Biography ==
Pabel Muñoz holds a degree in sociology from the Catholic University of Ecuador. He also has a master's degree in social sciences from the International University of Andalucía.

With the arrival of Augusto Barrera to the Mayor's Office of Quito in 2009, he joined his team as Secretary of Planning.

He served in various government offices during the presidency of Rafael Correa, such as National Secretary of Planning and Development of Ecuador. He later became a member of the Ecuadorian National Assembly for District 1 of the Pichincha Canton of Ecuador.

== Personal life ==
Pabel Muñoz has been passionate about soccer since childhood.

He is Catholic.

== Enternal links ==
- CIDOB biography (in Spanish)
