= Augusto Barrera =

Ecuadorian politician

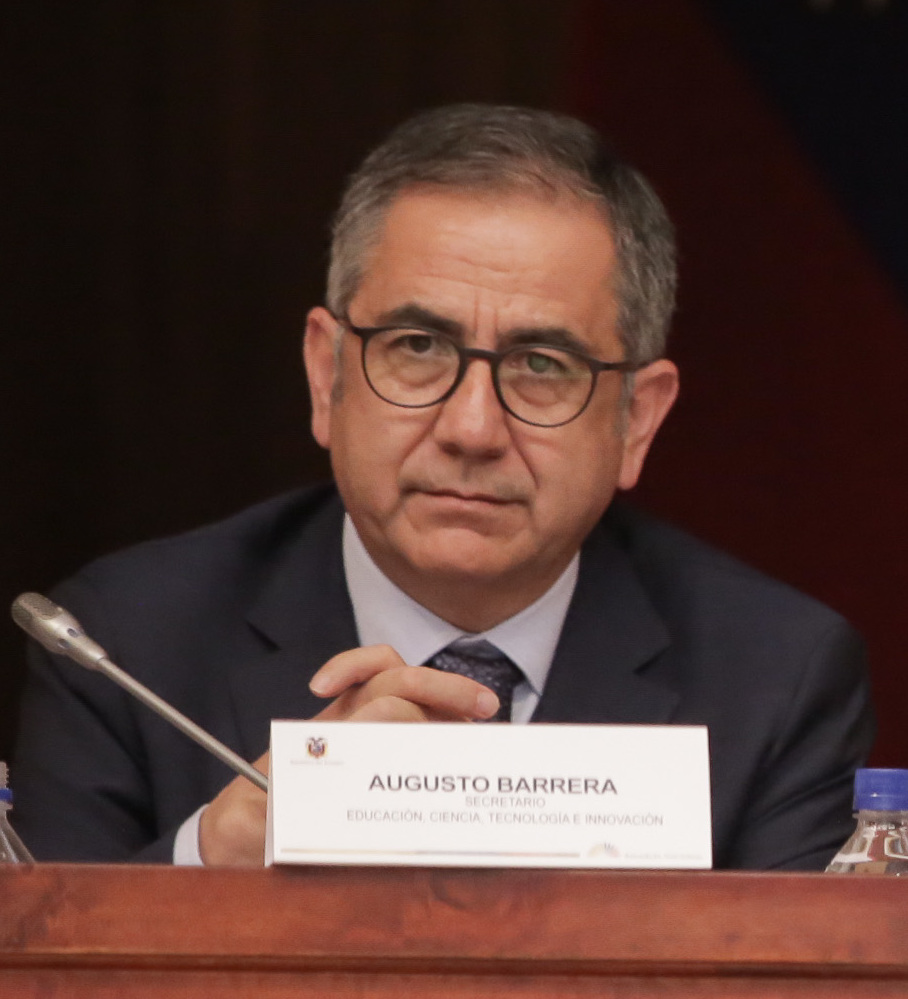

Metropolitan Mayor of Quito
- In office July 31, 2009 – May 14, 2014
- Preceded by: Andrés Vallejo
- Succeeded by: Mauricio Rodas

Personal details
- Born: December 11, 1961 (age 64) Quito, Ecuador
- Education: Central University of Ecuador; International University of Andalucía
- Occupation: Politician
- Profession: Doctor
- Website: web.archive.org/web/20090831092350/http://augustobarrera.revolucionciudadana.com.ec:80/

Adrián Augusto Barrera Guarderas is an Ecuadorian professor and politician who served as the Metropolitan Mayor of Quito from 2009 to 2014.

He has worked as a researcher and professor at several Ecuadorian and foreign universities. He is currently a professor at the Pontifical Catholic University of Ecuador.
