= Patricio Brabomalo =

Ecuadorian LGBT actor, writer and activist (1977–2005

- Born: September 7, 1977; Esmeraldas, Ecuador
- Died: October 17, 2005 (aged 28); Quito, Ecuador
- Occupations: LGBTQ activist; actor; writer

Patricio Brabomalo Molina (Esmeraldas, September 7, 1977 – Quito, October 17, 2005) was an Ecuadorian actor, writer, and activist. As a prominent member of the LGBTQ+ community, he was one of the founders of the Causana Foundation and the Patricio Brabomalo Award was named in his honor.

== Biography ==
Brabomalo completed his secondary studies in Portoviejo. He later moved to Quito, where he studied engineering.

In 1998 he premiered the play 516 caricias in the Casa de la Cultura Ecuatoriana. The title of the work referred to article 516 of the Ecuadorian Criminal Code which at the time criminalized homosexuality in the country.

He published the work Homosexualidades. Plumas, maricones y tortilleras en el Ecuador del siglo XXI in 2002, which became the first Ecuadorian non-fiction book to address sexual diversity.

In 2003 he founded, together with other activists, the Causana Feminist Lesbian Foundation, whose name in Quechua means "live" and which seeks to promote the rights of LGBT people by emphasizing giving spaces to lesbian women. He also was part of the Fedaeps LGBT organization and founded the Quito's Drag Group in 1996, which conducted transformism workshops, and which included members such as Pablo Gallegos, Ecuador's first professional drag queen, who was also Brabomalo's romantic partner at that time.

Brabomalo died on October 17, 2005 in a car accident between Riobamba and Quito, days after having participated in the opening of the headquarters of Causana. On February 14, 2013, the Quito Metropolitan Council approved the creation of the Patricio Brabomalo Award for people who have contributed to the struggle for the rights of the LGBT community in the city, named in honor of Brabomalo in recognition of his years of activism.

== Works ==
- 516 caricias (1998), Theatrical play
- Homosexualidades. Plumas, maricones y tortilleras en el Ecuador del siglo XXI (2002), essay
