= Monserrat Bustamante Chán =

Ecuadorian professor and academic

Monserratt Bustamante Chán
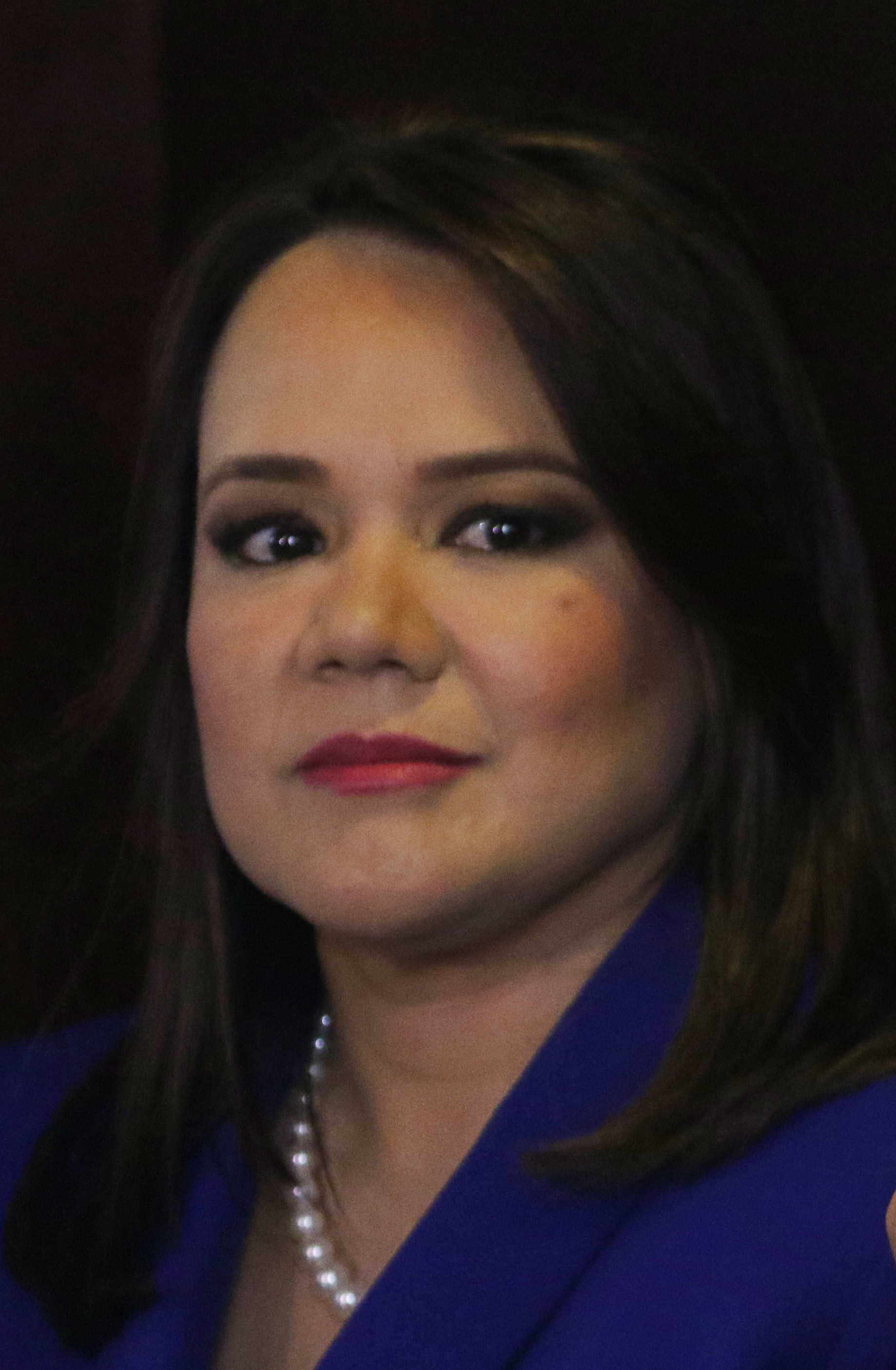
- Monserratt Bustamante Chán in 2018

Professor at Universidad Católica de Santiago de Guayaquil
- In office Oct 2004 – May 2013

Project Manager for the creation of Institutos Técnicos y Tecnológicos for Secretaría Nacional de Educación Superior, Ciencia, Tecnología e Innovación
- In office May 2013 – Sept 2013

Consultat for the implementation of the curricula of DUAL education system in Ecuador for the Cámara Alemano Ecuatoriana
- In office Oct 2013 – Nov 2013

Planning Director at Universidad Tecnológica ECOTEC
- In office Apr 2014 – Apr 2017

Academic Controller at Universidad Tecnológica ECOTEC
- In office May 2017 – Currently

Personal details
- Born: 15 April 1976 (age 50) Guayaquil, Ecuador
- Party: Centro Democrático Nacional
- Education: Universidad de Cadiz
- Website: https://www.centrodemocratico.org/formacionpolitica/#Monserrat-Bustamante

Monserratt Bustamante Chán (born April 15, 1976) is an Ecuadorian professor and academic. In 2017 she ran as a candidate for Vice President of Ecuador alongside presidential candidate Paco Moncayo, in alliance with Izquierda Democrática, Centro Democrático Nacional and Acuerdo Nacional por el Cambio.

== Biography ==
Monserrat Bustamante Chán was born in Guayaquil, Ecuador on April 15, 1976. She is the daughter of Jorge Luis Bustamante Guevara and Monserrat Chán Ramírez (deceased), and is the elder of their two children. She also has another sister from her father’s next marriage.

Monserratt is married to Patricio Alfredo Agreda Aguirre and has a son, Johnny Andres.

== Career ==
Her professional teaching career began at the age of 18. In 2002, she was a professor of English in Literature and Sciences at the Unidad Educativa Santiago Mayor until 2016. In 2007, she also worked as the administrative coordinator at the Faculty of Philosophy of the Universidad Católica de Santiago de Guayaquil (UCSG). In 2009, she participated in a portfolio product design and a marketing plan called “Fibra de banana-Mujeres Trabajadoras Del Triunfo” of the Corporation for the Promotion of Exports and Imports (CORPEI).

A year later, she was a trainer for the second and third editions of Cerveceria Nacional’s Siembra Futuro.

She provided consulting services to the National Secretariat for Higher Education, Science, Technology and Innovation (Senescyt), also the German Chamber on curricular design.

From October 2004 to May 2011, she was a professor in the International Business Management Career at the Universidad Católica de Santiago de Guayaquil (UCSG). Between October 2008 and August 2011, she was the curricular coordinator of the Academic Vice-Rectorate of this institution. From May 2008 to March 2014, she taught in the career of Ingenieria de Empresas Formation Dual at the same university. She has also been a visiting Professor for the Postgraduate System in the Master's Degree in Higher Education, as well as a conference translator.

Since April 2014, she has been the director of Institutional Planning and a full-time professor of the Faculty of Marketing and Communication at ECOTEC University. As of August 2017, she is currently the Academic Controller at ECOTEC University.

== Education ==
Her primary studies began at the American School of Guayaquil and finished at La Moderna. She obtained the bachelor's degree in Accounting and Administrative Sciences. Her higher studies were carried out at Brookdale Community College, University of South Carolina, and at the Universidad de Especialidades Espíritu Santo (UEES), where she obtained her degree in Business Sciences with a major in Marketing.

She has a master's degree in Educational Management and Educational Leadership from the Universidad Técnica Particular de Loja (UTPL) and a Higher Diploma in Marketing Management from the Universidad Católica de Santiago de Guayaquil.

Currently, she handled her thesis as a PhD candidate in the field of teacher's training, at the University of Cadiz in Spain, with expected graduation date October 2018.

== Awards ==
- Paul Harris Prize awarded by the International Rotary Foundation for the execution of the Integral Development Project of the Commune of Santa Martha de Samborondón.

== Projects ==
Monserrat participated in the elaboration of the first EVADO project (Evaluación de Competencias Docentes de Ecuador) which is carried out jointly with the University of Córdoba-Spain and is financed by Banco Santander, of that country. She is also involved in Social Inclusion and Human Development projects. She is the founding director of the Arista Cultural Group, which runs the first Rural Education Program in the canton Samborondón.

She has been a speaker at the IV International Scientific Congress, at the 1st International Scientific Congress Knowledge Society: Challenges and Perspectives, at the III International Scientific Congress the Challenges of the University before the Knowledge Society and the University of the XXIst Century. She has also written scientific articles on different academic topics.

== Political career ==
Monserratt Bustamante got into politics on November 10, 2016 when presidential candidate Paco Moncayo announced her name as his running mate by the alliance of Izquierda Democrática, Centro Democrático and Acuerdo Nacional por el Cambio.

She was registered in the National Electoral Council (CNE) on November 12 to participate in the elections of February 2017.

She believes that education and politics go hand by hand. "It is the education that generates the different contexts of development".

In February 2018, she embarked on a 10 province tour to promote the "yes" option at the Constitutional Referendum held on Ecuador, as her party's national spokeswoman, the only one of its kind.
