= Patricio Brabomalo Award =

Ecuadorian award for LGBTQ+ activists

- Coat of arms of Quito
- Native name: Premio Patricio Brabomalo Molina
- Country: Ecuador
- Presented by: Metropolitan District of Quito
- Eligibility: Prominent LGBTQ+ rights activists
- Established: 11 April 2012

Highlights
- Total recipients: 7
- Related: Patricio Brabomalo

The Patricio Brabomalo Award (Spanish: Premio Patricio Brabomalo Molina) is an award presented by the Metropolitan District of Quito to Ecuadorians who have stood out in the defense of LGBTQ+ rights. The award was created by Municipal Ordinance 224 (Article 31), which was approved on 11 April 2012. It is managed by the Social Equity and Gender Commission of the municipality.

Originally, the official name of the award was the "GLBTI Community Award", but was renamed in honor of Patricio Brabomalo, an Ecuadorian LGBTQ+ rights activist, on 26 February 2013.

== Recipients ==
Year	Recipient	Ref.
2015	León Sierra Páez	
2016	Sandra Álvarez	
2017	Daniel Moreno	
2018	Geovanni Augusto Jaramillo	
2021	Purita Pelayo	
2022	Karla Pillajo Rodríguez	
2023	Nebraska Montenegro	
2025	MoTa Fajardo	

== See also ==
- Patricio Brabomalo
- LGBTQ rights in Ecuador
