= Carina Vance =

Government minister of Ecuador and LGBT activist

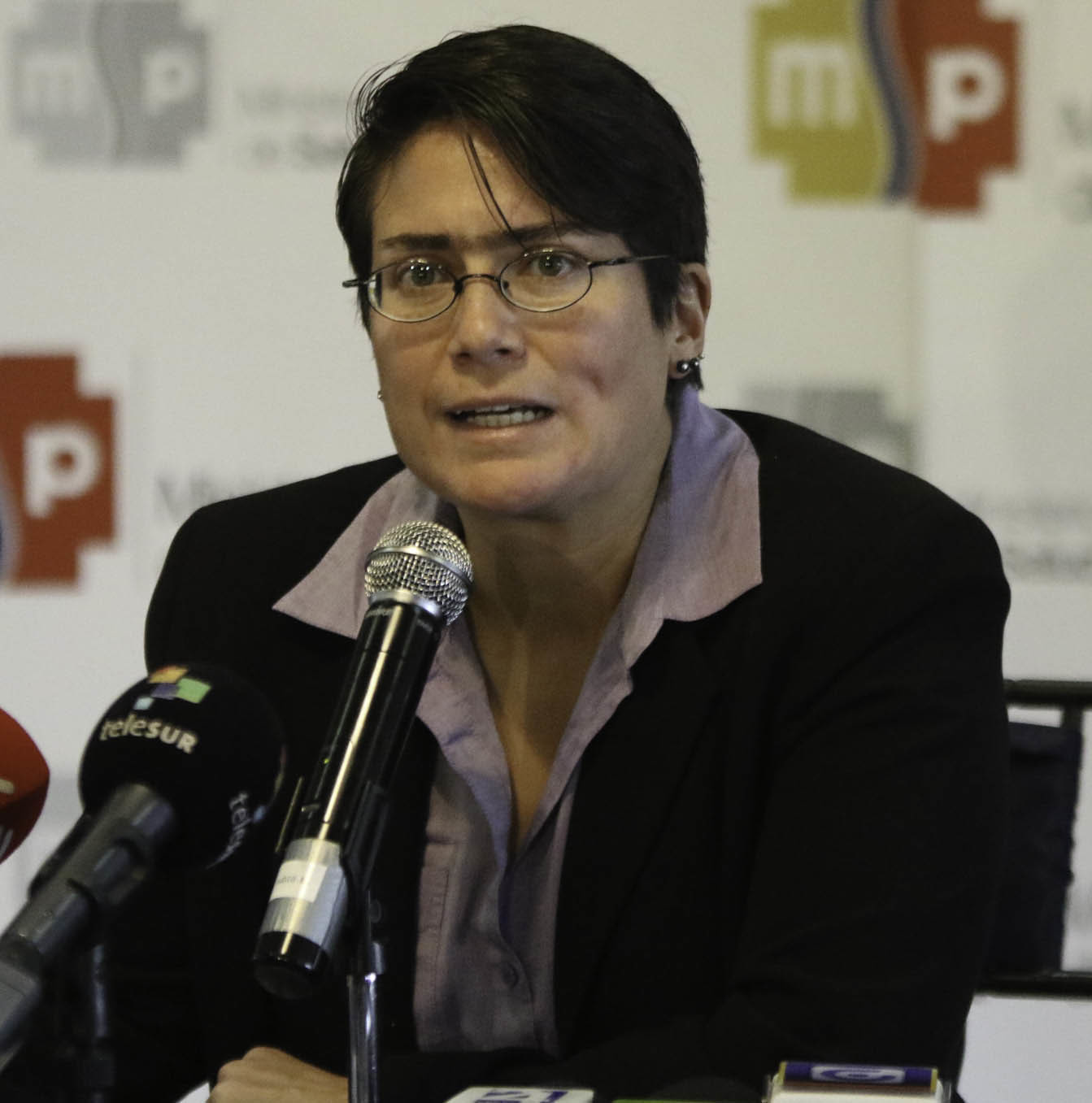
- Vance in 2014
- Born: Carina Isabel Vance Mafla; 1977 (age 48–49); Oakland, California, U.S.
- Education: Williams College, University of California, Berkeley
- Occupation: Minister for Public Health
- Known for: Lesbian, gay, bisexual, and transgender rights activism

Carina Isabel Vance Mafla (born 1977) is a former Minister for Public Health of Ecuador. Vance was born in Oakland, California. She went to high school in Ecuador and attended university in the United States. After attending Williams College for her undergraduate degree and earning a master's degree in public health from the University of California, Berkeley, she returned to Ecuador in 2004.

Vance is openly lesbian. She spent time in Europe as a girl, where, at the age of thirteen, she and her first girlfriend were attacked by homophobic youths. Vance had already begun to understand and accept her identity as a lesbian, but said that this incident "was not only a discovery of my homosexuality, but also society's reaction to it." She subsequently worked as a lesbian, gay, bisexual, and transgender (LGBT) rights activist and was the executive director of Fundacion Causana, a lesbian rights organization.

Vance was appointed to the Cabinet by President Rafael Correa in January 2012, after her predecessor David Chiriboga resigned amid concerns that he was unable to fix the problems in Ecuador's national healthcare system. Vance announced her intent to shut down a system of religious "clinics" which said they could "cure" gays and particularly lesbians of their homosexuality and which had been reported to torture inmates physically and psychologically and to hold them against their will. Fundacion Causana had been working to close these types of institutions for ten years. When a network of almost 200 such illegal "clinics" was discovered four years earlier, Vance's organization and other LGBT rights and progressive organizations pressured Correa's government to shut them down. This led to the closure of thirty such clinics in September 2011 and a plan, presented by Chiriboga before his resignation, to continue the work. Soon after Vance was appointed to the Cabinet, the ministry raided three of the "torture clinics" near Quito and rescued dozens of women. She also discussed plans to reform the administration of the country's hospitals.

== See also ==
- Health in Ecuador
- LGBT rights in Ecuador
