= Paco Moncayo =

Ecuadorian politician and general

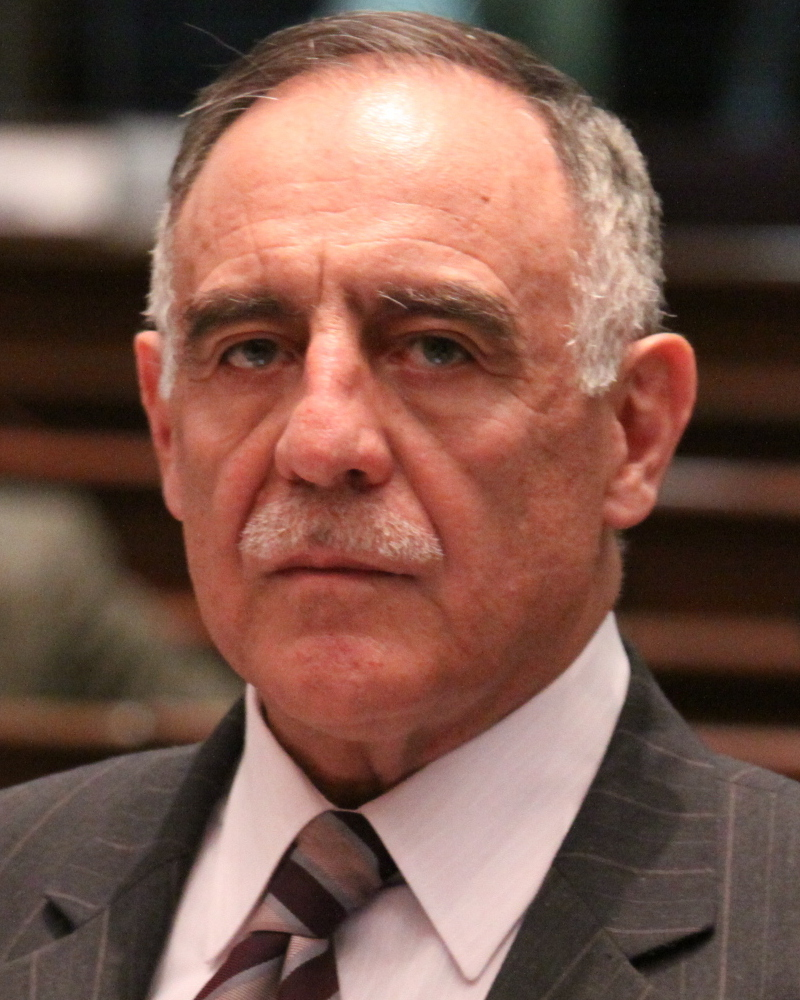
- Moncayo in 2010

Metropolitan Mayor of Quito
- In office August 10, 2000 – January 29, 2009
- Preceded by: Roque Sevilla
- Succeeded by: Andrés Vallejo Arcos

Personal details
- Born: October 8, 1940 (age 85) Quito, Ecuador
- Party: Democratic Left
- Spouse: Martha Miño de Moncayo
- Children: 4
- Education: Colegio Militar "Eloy Alfaro" Universidad Central del Ecuador Inter American Defense College
- Profession: Military, politician
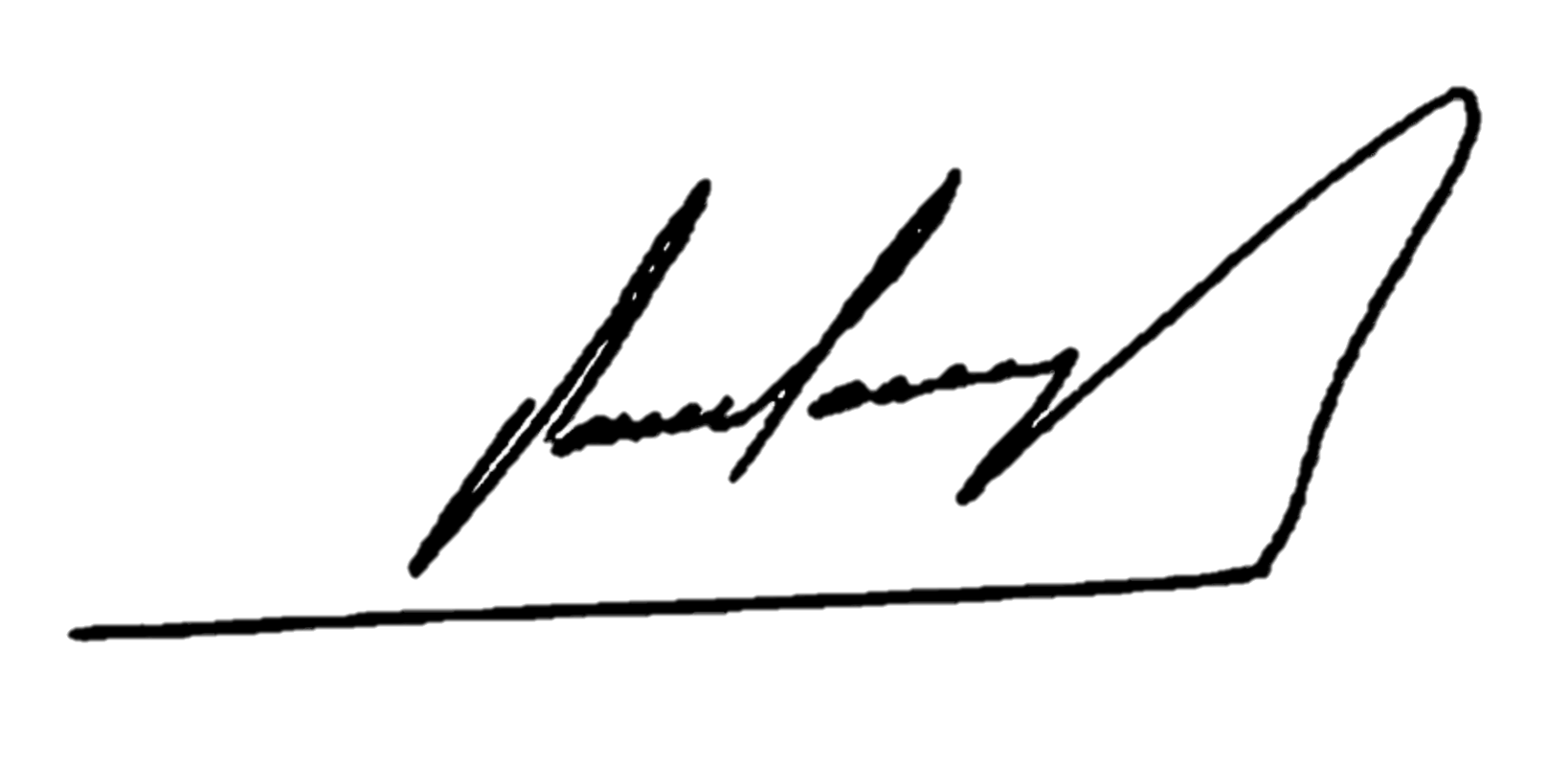
- Signature
- Website: http://www.pacomoncayo.com/

Paco Rosendo Moncayo Gallegos (born October 8, 1940) is an Ecuadorian politician and retired general who was Metropolitan Mayor of Quito from 2000 to 2009.

== Career ==
During his military career, he was the Commander in Chief of the Army in the Alto Cenepa War between Ecuador and Peru. He served as a National Deputy from 1998 to 2000 and was a member of both the National Security Council and its Consultative Assembly for Foreign Affairs. In 2000 Paco Moncayo was elected Metropolitan Mayor of Quito on behalf of the Party of the Democratic Left, and he was re-elected for a second term in 2004. He was co-president of United Cities and Local Governments as of November 2007 and was longlisted for the 2008 World Mayor award.

Between 2009 and 2013 Moncayo was a representative for Pichincha Province in the National Assembly under the Alianza Libertad. He ran for a seat in the Assembly again in the 2013 general election with the Ruptura 25 movement, but failed to win a seat.

=== 2017 Ecuadorian presidential election ===
Moncayo was a candidate in the February 2017 presidential election, in alliance with Izquierda Democrática, Centro Democrático and Acuerdo Nacional por el Cambio. He placed fourth in the election. His running mate was Monserrat Bustamante Chán, director of Institutional Planning and full-time professor of the Faculty of Marketing and Communication in ECOTEC University.

== Honors ==
He is a Legion of Merit recipient and has been awarded military and civilian Ecuadorian and international decorations.

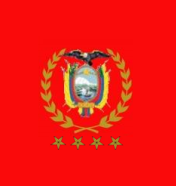
Seal of an Ecuadorian General of the Army

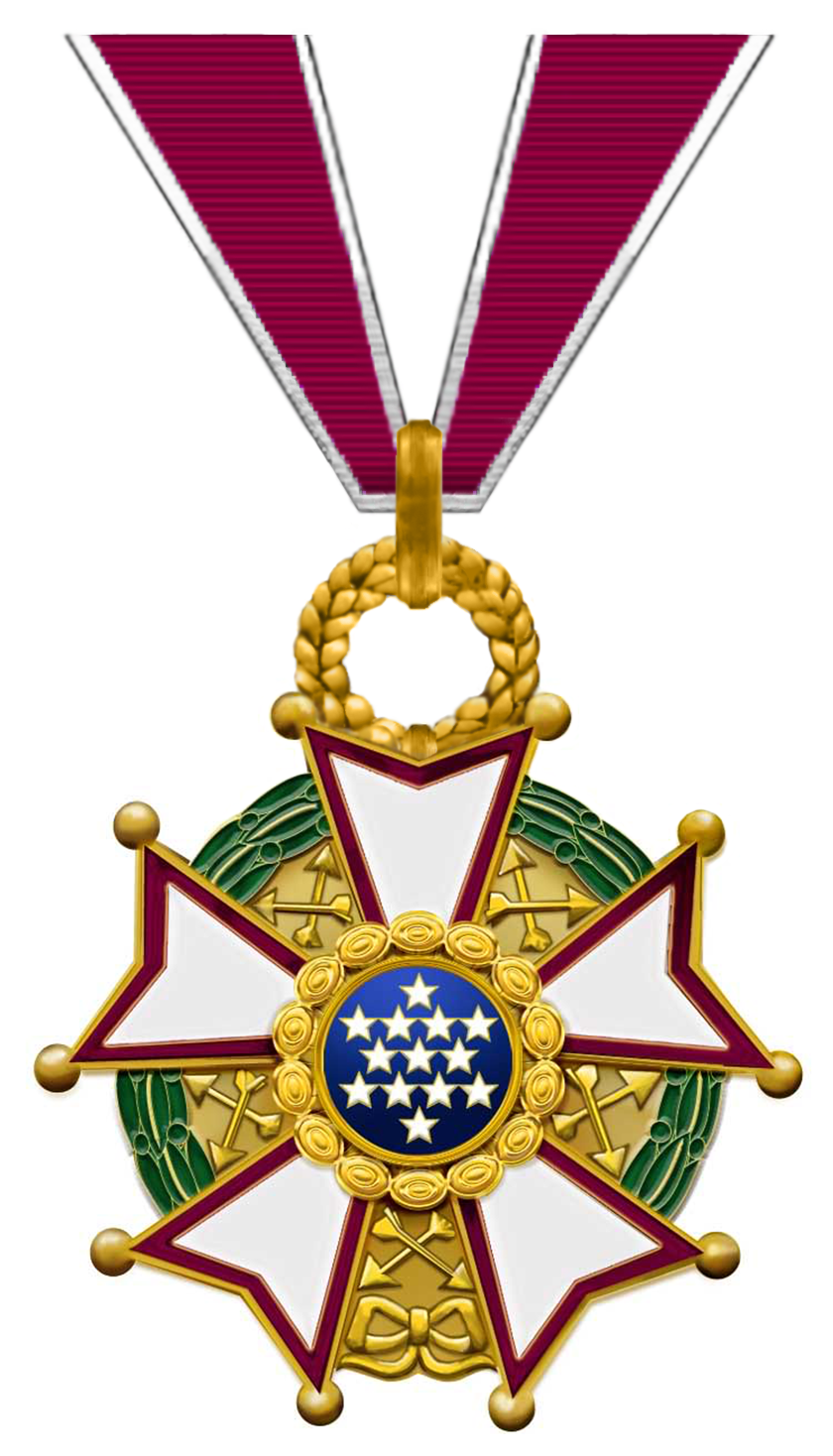
Legion of Merit, Commander Degree

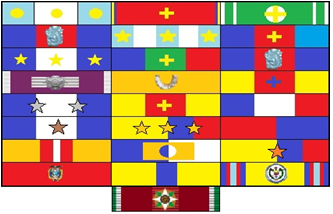
General Moncayo's Ribbons
- Order of Abdon Calderón de Primera Clase (two times).
- Order of Abdon Calderón de Tercera Clase.
- Condecoración Vencedores de Tarqui en Grado de Comendador.
- Cruz de Honor Militar.
- Gran Cruz de Honor Militar.
- Condecoración Fuerzas Armadas de Tercera Clase.
- Condecoración Fuerzas Armadas de Segunda Clase.
- Condecoración Fuerzas Armadas de Primera Clase.
- Cruz de Honor Militar de la República de Brasil.
- Cruz al Mérito Militar República de Argentina.
- Condecoración al Mérito Militar de la República de Chile.
- Condecoración Coronel Francisco Bolognesi de la República del Perú.
- Orden de Carabobo al Mérito Militar República Bolivariana de Venezuela.
- The Legion of Merit (Degree of commander) United States of America.
- Gran Collar de la Armada del Ecuador.
- Cruz al Mérito de Guerra en el grado de Gran Cruz (por participación en el Alto Cenepa).
- Condecoración a la excelencia professional otorgada por el Congreso Nacional.
- Condecoración de la Academia de Guerra del Ecuador.
- Gran Collar de Honor Militar.
