= Roque Sevilla =

Ecuadorian economist and politician

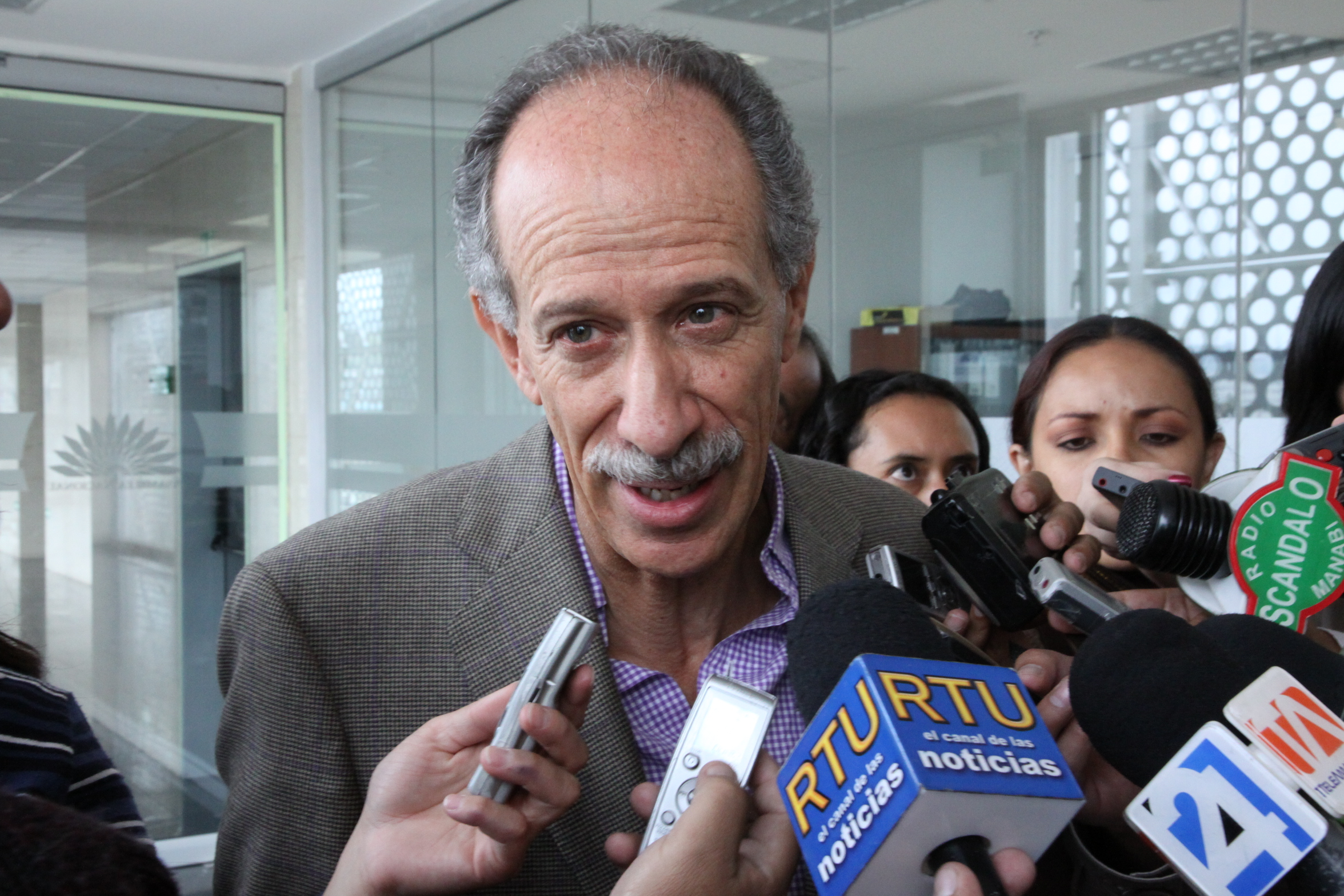
- Roque Sevilla in 2010

Metropolitan Mayor of Quito Member of the National Congress of Ecuador

Personal details
- Born: Roque Sevilla Larrea; July 16, 1947 (age 79) Quito, Ecuador
- Party: Christian Democratic Union
- Education: Pontifical Catholic University of Ecuador, Harvard University John F. Kennedy School of Government
- Occupation: Environmentalist, hotel owner and manager
- Profession: Economist, businessman, politician
- Known for: Environmentalism, entrepreneurship, politics
- Website: Roque Sevilla

Roque Sevilla Larrea (born July 16, 1947, in Quito) is an Ecuadorian economist, businessman, environmentalist and politician. He was the Metropolitan Mayor of Quito between 1998 and 2000. He is President of the "Grupo Futuro" that brings together various companies including tourism, insurance, and the environment.

== Education ==
He studied at the Colegio Cardenal Spellman and then at the Colegio Alemán.

He studied economics at the Pontifical Catholic University of Ecuador, graduating as an economist in 1984.

He earned a Master's degree of Public Administration from Harvard University's John F. Kennedy School of Government.

== Career ==
In 1976, he founded the "Fundación Natura".

In 1991, he was appointed Director of the World Wide Fund for Nature (WWF) in the United States.

In 1997, he was appointed to the Board of the World Wide Fund for Nature International (WWF-I).

He was a councilor for the Metropolitan District of Quito in 1992.

He was a member of the National Congress of Ecuador in 1998, and Metropolitan Mayor of Quito between 1998 and 2000.

In 2012, he built and inaugurated the luxury eco hotel "Mashpi Lodge" deep inside the Chocó forest, a cloud forest in the Andes, 100 km northwest of Quito.

Political offices
| Preceded by Jamil Mahuad | Metropolitan Mayor of Quito; August 10, 1998-August 10, 2000 | Succeeded by Paco Moncayo |
