= Álvaro Pérez Intriago =

Ecuadorian politician (1936–2016)

Member of the National Congress
- In office 1996–2002

Member of the National Congress
- In office 1984–1986

Mayor of Quito
- In office 1978–1982
- Preceded by: Alberto Donoso Darquea
- Succeeded by: Luis Andrade Nieto

Provincial Prefect of Pichincha
- In office 1970–1974
- Preceded by: Manuel Córdova Galarza
- Succeeded by: Agustín Patiño

Member of the Quito city council
- In office 1967–1970

Personal details
- Born: August 10, 1936 Quito, Ecuador
- Died: August 2, 2016 (aged 79) Quito, Ecuador
- Party: Liberal Party

Álvaro Pérez Intriago (August 10, 1936 – August 2, 2016) was an Ecuadorian politician. Perez served as the Mayor of Quito from 1978 to 1982. He also served as a deputy in the National Congress from 1984 to 1986 and again from 1996 to 2002. In 2002, Pérez became a candidate for Vice President of Ecuador as the running mate of presidential hopeful Xavier Neira Menéndez.

Álvaro Pérez Intriago was born in Quito, Ecuador, on August 10, 1936. He became a lawyer before entering politics. Pérez served on the Quito city council from 1967 to 1970. He then became the Provincial Prefect of Pichincha Province, the head of the province, from 1970 to 1976.

Pérez served as Mayor of Quito, the nation's capitol, from 1978 to 1982. Pérez oversaw the construction of the highway to the Valle de Los Chillos, as well as two of the city's major avenues, Occidental and Eloy Alfaro. He also spearheaded the building of the Mercado Mayorista and moved one of the city's bus terminals, Terminal Terrestre de Cumandá, to the outskirts of Quito.

In 2002, Xavier Neira Menéndez, the presidential candidate for the Social Christian Party, chose Pérez as his running mate for Vice President of Ecuador. The Neira-Pérez ticket placed fifth in the 2002 presidential election, receiving 553,106 votes, or 12.1%, and did not advance to the presidential runoff election (which was won by Lucio Gutiérrez).

In 2005, Pérez was appointed Ambassador to the United States by President Alfredo Palacio, but Perez never took office.

Pérez died in Quito on August 2, 2016, at the age of 79.
