= Andrés Vallejo =

Ecuadorian lawyer, journalist and politician

Andrés Vallejo Arcos
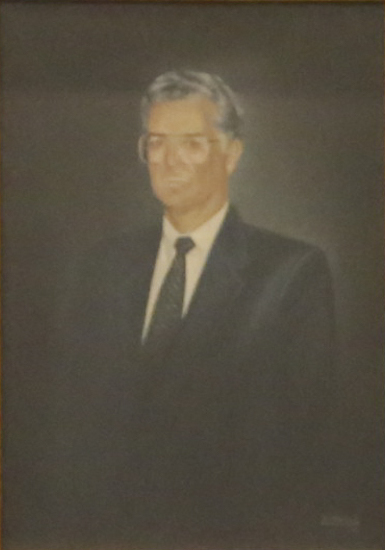

Metropolitan Mayor of Quito
- In office January 29, 2009 – July 31, 2009
- Preceded by: Paco Moncayo
- Succeeded by: Augusto Barrera

Personal details
- Education: Universidad Central del Ecuador
- Occupation: Politician
- Profession: Lawyer

Andrés Vallejo Arcos is an Ecuadorian lawyer, journalist and politician who served as the Metropolitan Mayor of Quito. He assumed the role after the previous mayor, Paco Moncayo, resigned to run for congress. Vallejo previously served as a city councilman. Vallejo has also served in high-profile roles such as the President of the National Congress from 1986 to 1987, and the minister of the Ministerio de Gobierno from 1988 to 1990.
