= Provincial Integration Movement =

Political party in Ecuador

The Provincial Integration Movement (Movimiento Integración Provincial) was a minor political party in Ecuador. At the legislative elections on October 20, 2002, the party won just 1 out of 100 seats to Congress, having elected Andrade Endara Vinicio to it.
