= Jorge Yunda =

Ecuadorian politician

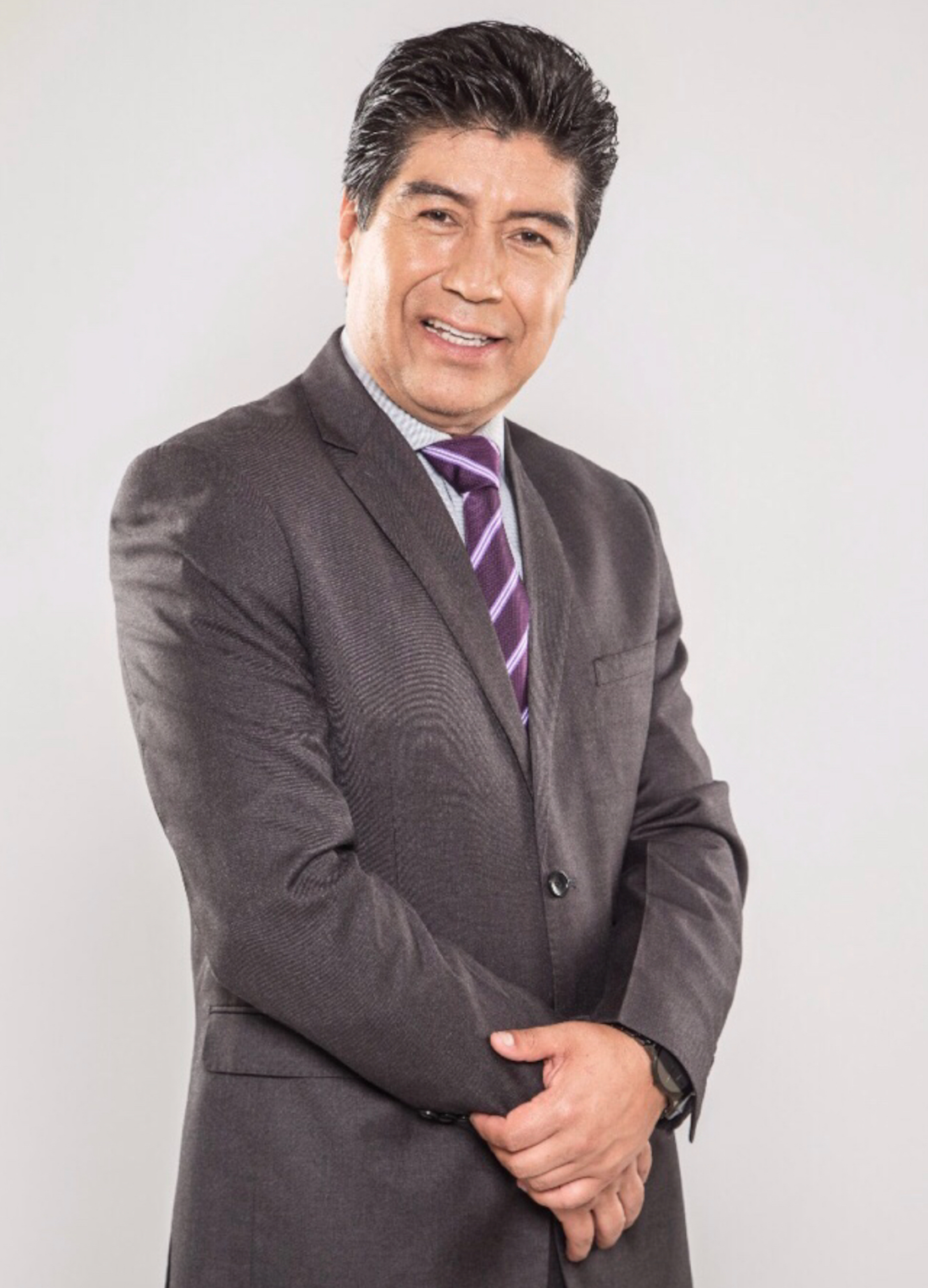

Metropolitan Mayor of Quito
- In office 14 May 2019 – 29 September 2021
- Preceded by: Mauricio Rodas
- Succeeded by: Santiago Guarderas

Member of the National Assembly from the Pichincha Province
- In office 14 May 2017 – 12 December 2018

Personal details
- Born: Jorge Homero Yunda Machado; 28 August 1965 (age 60) Guano, Ecuador
- Occupation: Physician, politician, radio broadcaster

Jorge Homero Yunda Machado (born 28 August 1965) is an Ecuadorian politician, physician, musician and radio broadcaster. He was a member of the PAIS Alliance but then changed parties to Centro Democrático. From 2017 until 2018, he served as a member of the National Assembly, when he run for the position as Metropolitan Mayor of Quito, under the Unión Ecuatoriana movement. He occupied the post from 2019 until 2021 when the municipal council decided to remove him from office due to several allegations of corruption against him.

== Professional career ==
He completed his higher education at the Faculty of Medical Sciences of the [Central University of Ecuador, where he graduated with a degree in medicine. He worked as a surgeon at the Eugenio Espejo Hospital, the Hospital del Sur, and the Isidro Ayora Maternity Hospital.

He combined his medical career with broadcasting, an activity he pursued since his student days. In 2005, he decided to devote himself fully to the broadcasting profession. He worked for the radio stations Jesús del Gran Poder, Francisco Stereo, América, Cordillera, and Radio Canela. He led his own radio broadcasting projects under the “Canela” brand, consolidating it as one of the most listened to stations in its coverage areas. In his radio career, he is known by the pseudonym “Loro Homero,” inherited from his grandmother and his middle name, Homero.

== Political career ==
During the administration of Rafael Correa, Yunda headed the former Conartel (National Radio and Television Council) between 2007 and 2009.

In February 2017, he was elected to the National Assembly (Ecuador) representing the province of Pichincha as part of the Alianza PAIS (AP) Movement.

In 2019, he was elected Mayor of Quito under the Unión Ecuatoriana movement. According to the National Electoral Council (CNE), Yunda obtained 296,096 votes (21.4% of valid votes) in the local election.

In the early hours of June 3, 2021, with 14 votes in favor, the Quito Metropolitan Council approved his removal from office due to several allegations of corruption against him. Following this decision, Deputy Mayor Santiago Guarderas took office as acting mayor of Quito until the respective review and appeal processes are completed and a decision is made by the Council. The decision made by the Quito Metropolitan Council was unanimously ratified by the Electoral Court on the morning of July 1, 2021, thus confirming Yunda's removal from office.

On July 30, 2021, the Court of Pichincha overturned the process to remove Jorge Yunda, rendering Guarderas' appointment null and void. However, on September 29, the Constitutional Court accepted the protective action filed by Guarderas, overturning the court rulings in favor of Yunda and confirming Guarderas' succession as mayor, this ruling being final.

On September 22, 2025, The Provincial Court of Pichincha upheld the innocence ofYunda and other 13 defendants in the case involving the purchase of PCR tests by the Municipality of Quito during the COVID-19 pandemic.
