= Santiago Guarderas =

Ecuadorian politician

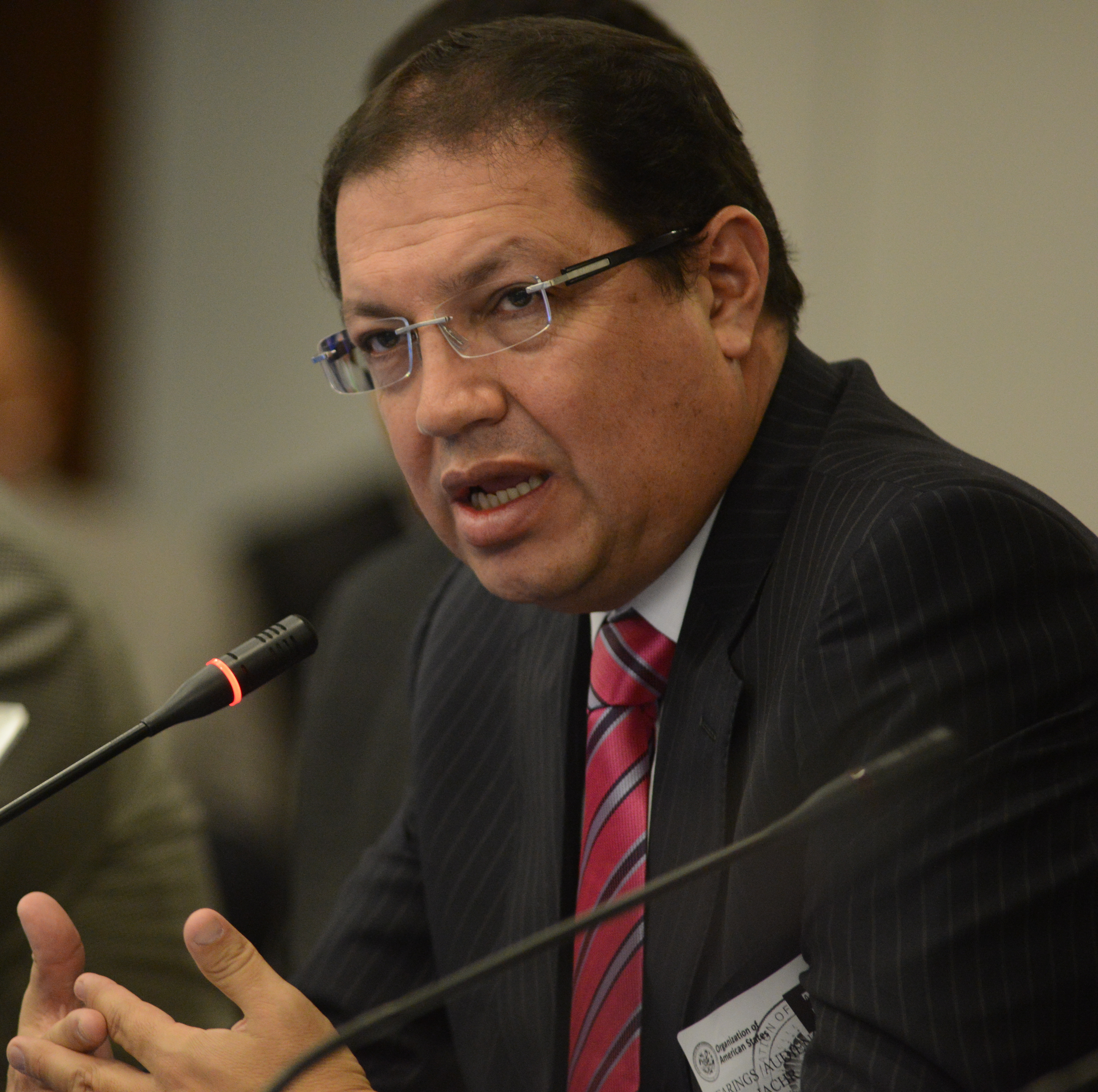

Metropolitan Mayor of Quito
- In office 30 September 2021 – 14 May 2023
- Preceded by: Jorge Yunda
- Succeeded by: Pabel Muñoz

Vice Metropolitan Mayor of Quito
- In office 14 May 2019 – 29 September 2021
- Preceded by: Eduardo del Pozo
- Succeeded by: Brith Vaca

Member of the National Congress from the Pichincha Province
- In office 5 January 2007 – 30 November 2007

Personal details
- Born: Santiago Guarderas Izquierdo; 1964 (age 61–62) Quito, Ecuador
- Party: Ecuadorian Union Party (since 2019)
- Other political affiliations: Democratic Left (before 2007); Social Christian Party (2007–2019)
- Education: Pontifical Catholic University of Ecuador
- Occupation: Lawyer and politician

Santiago Guarderas Izquierdo (born 1964) is an Ecuadorian politician and lawyer. He was the Metropolitan Mayor of Quito from 30 September 2021 to 14 May 2023.

== Early life ==
Born in 1964, he studied law at Pontifical Catholic University of Ecuador in Quito. He worked on the faculty at the same institution.

== Career ==
Guarderas was elected to the National Congress in January 2007 as a member of the Social Christian Party. He left office when the assembly was dissolved in November 2007. He unsuccessfully ran for the National Assembly in 2017.

In 2019, he became Vice Mayor of Quito alongside Jorge Yunda as Mayor. In July 2021, he assumed the role of mayor when there was a leadership dispute with Yunda during protests.

On 30 September 2021, Guarderas succeeded Yunda as Quito's mayor. He was succeeded by Pabel Muñoz on 14 May 2023.
