= Solidarity Fatherland Movement =

Political party in Ecuador

The Solidarity Fatherland Movement (Movimiento Patria Solidaria) is a Christian-democratic political party in Ecuador. At the 2002 legislative elections, the party won 1 seat, of a possible 100.
