= Mauricio Rodas =

Ecuadorian politician

Mauricio Esteban Rodas Espinel
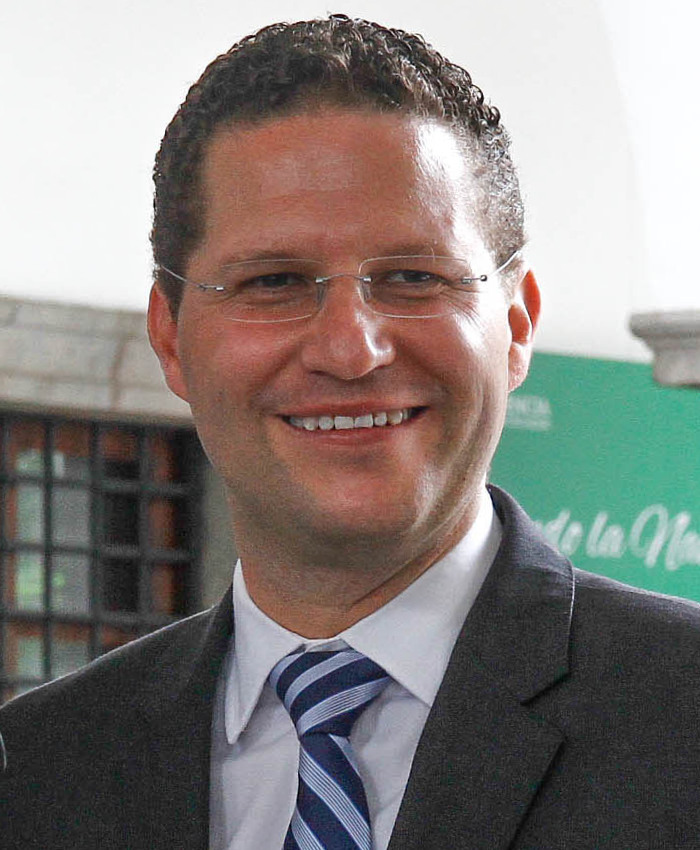

Metropolitan Mayor of Quito
- In office 14 May 2014 – 14 May 2019
- Preceded by: Augusto Barrera
- Succeeded by: Jorge Yunda

Personal details
- Born: 15 April 1975 (age 51) Quito, Ecuador
- Party: SUMA
- Spouse: Andrea Vivero
- Children: Adriana, Mauricio, Ana Cristina and Leonor
- Education: Pontificia Universidad Católica del Ecuador
- Occupation: Politician
- Profession: Lawyer, political analyst
- Website: www.quito.gob.ec/index.php/municipio/alcalde

Mauricio Esteban Rodas Espinel (born 15 April 1975) is an Ecuadorian lawyer, social policy consultant, and politician who served as the Metropolitan Mayor of Quito between May 2014 and May 2019. After working in other Latin American cities, including Mexico City, he returned to Ecuador to enter politics. He founded the SUMA Party, and was the youngest person every to be elected as Mayor of Quito.

== Early life, education and marriage ==
Born in Quito on April 15, 1975, Rodas is a Doctor in Law from the Pontifical Catholic University of Ecuador in Quito. Thanks to a Fulbright fellowship and a scholarship from the Organization of American States (OAS), he earned two master's degrees at the University of Pennsylvania, in Government Administration and Political Science. He is the father of four children. In 2021 he got remarried to Andrea Vivero.

== Career ==
After graduation, he began his professional career at the Economic Commission for Latin America and the Caribbean in Santiago de Chile, where he published works on sustainable development in Latin America.

Later, he moved to Mexico, where he founded DS Consultores, a public policy consulting firm based in Mexico City. He advised different Federal government ministries in Mexico, as well as state and local governments in that country.

In 2007, Dr. Rodas founded Fundacion Ethos, a public policy think tank in Mexico City. Since 2008, Dr. Rodas promotes a political concept called "Responsible Government Model", an innovative and modern vision that seeks to go beyond the traditional left-right wing divide to foster prosperity based on responsible policies.

Dr. Rodas has worked as analyst for various international media enterprises, including: CNN, Televisa, TV Azteca, Foreign Policy, BBC World, Reforma, Revista Poder, among others.

Between 2011 and 2019 Rodas was a high-profile political figure in Ecuador. Since 2019, after finishing his mayoral term, Rodas has been a Visiting Scholar at the University of Pennsylvania, where he lectures on cities climate infrastructure financing. Also, he is currently a Senior Advisor on Heat and City Diplomacy at the Adrienne Arsht-Rockefeller Foundation Resilience Center at the Atlantic Council, where he leads the "City Champions for Heat Action Initiative". Rodas is the co-Chair of the World Economic Forum's Global Commission on BiodiverCities, and a member of the United Nations' Committee of Experts on Public Administration. He coordinated the creation of the SDSN Global Commission for Urban SDG Finance, co-Chaired by the Mayor of Paris, Anne Hidalgo, the Mayor of Rio de Janeiro, Eduardo Paes, and Prof. Jeffrey Sachs. Rodas is the Executive Secretary of this Commission, which is exploring and promoting reforms to the global financial architecture to increase cities' access to climate finance.

== Political career ==
In 2011, Rodas returned to Ecuador to enter national and local politics. He is the founder and president of Movimiento Sociedad Unida Más Acción (SUMA), a national political party. He ran for president of Ecuador in the 2013 general elections, obtaining the fourth place among eight candidates, a surprise result in the election.

On May 14, 2014, Rodas took office as Metropolitan Mayor of Quito, after winning the election against the incumbent candidate with 61% of the votes. He was the youngest mayor in the history of the city.

Rodas was the hosting mayor of the United Nations Conference on Urban Sustainable Development Habitat III, receiving almost 30,000 international delegates.

He has been very active in the most important city networks. In 2015 he was elected World co-President of United Cities and Local Governments (for which he was reelected for a second term). He was a member of the Global Executive Committee of Local Governments for Sustainability, the Board of the Global Covenant of Mayors for Climate & Energy, and Vice Chair of C40 Cities Climate Leadership Group.

He was a Global Young Leader and a member of the Global Future Councils of the World Economic Forum.

== Mayoral achievements ==
=== First METRO Line in the city and country ===
In 2016 Rodas began the construction of the largest infrastructure project in the city's history: the Metro. After only three years of construction, the first Metro trial trip with passengers took place in March 2019.

During Rodas' mayoral term, international economic figures, such as the president of the Interamerican Development Bank and the vice-president of the World Bank, recognized Quito's Metro as an international example of a project of its kind: it was completed on schedule, on budget and using the latest technology.

When Rodas left office in May 2019, the Metro had 93% construction progress and a ready-to-implement roadmap for its operation within 6 months. However, due to subsequent technical and administrative failures, it took three municipal administrations and almost 5 years for having the Metro operating on December 1, 2023. The World Bank has praised the important social, economic and environmental benefits the Metro is bringing to Quito's citizens.

=== Turn Down Harassment ===
Quito's transportation system has gender policies to promote a safer environment for all. "Turn Down Harassment" is a program directed at suppressing sexual harassment in the public transportation system. Persons may report harassment by SMS text messages and activate alarms in buses by text. The World Economic Forum recognized this program as one of the top 20 global social innovations in 2017.

=== Social policies ===
Mayor Rodas has also focused on social policies. For example, "Health on the Way" is an initiative to control malnutrition and non-communicable chronic diseases, the leading causes of death in the city. Health kiosks are located in public spaces so that residents may track their health indicators and also access free advice on healthy habits. With a low budget, this program has delivered more than one million free messages to individuals in three years

=== Heritage conservation and Light Festival ===
During his term, Mayor Rodas has worked deeply on the conservation of the city's heritage, especially in the Historic District, where nearly 2 kilometers of streets were transformed into pedestrian lanes.

In 2016 Mayor Rodas launched the light festival in the Historic District. Heritage buildings and public spaces served as gigantic canvases for this magical show. The light festival boosted domestic and international tourism. In 2018, during its third edition, this celebration attracted more than 3.2 million people, becoming the second-largest festival of light in the world.

=== Environment ===
Mayor Rodas was the hosting mayor of the United Nations Conference on Sustainable Urban Development – Habitat lll, the largest UN conference in history, making Quito the gathering point for hundreds of mayors and the center for discussion of the most relevant urban issues. On the climate change arena, he has fostered avant-garde regulations regarding the reduction of single use plastics, the preservation of natural protected areas, and incentives to promote the use of electric vehicles.

In 2017, during the One Planet Summit organized by President Emmanuelle Macron and UN Secretary General Antonio Gutierrez, Mayor Rodas launched a global Call to Action to redesign the international financing architecture and channel resources into cities for an effective climate change fight. Mayor Rodas has played a major leadership international role.

In April 2019, he was selected as of the 100 World's Most Influential People for Climate Policy by Apolitical.
