= LGBTQ history in Ecuador =

History of LGBTQ people in Ecuador

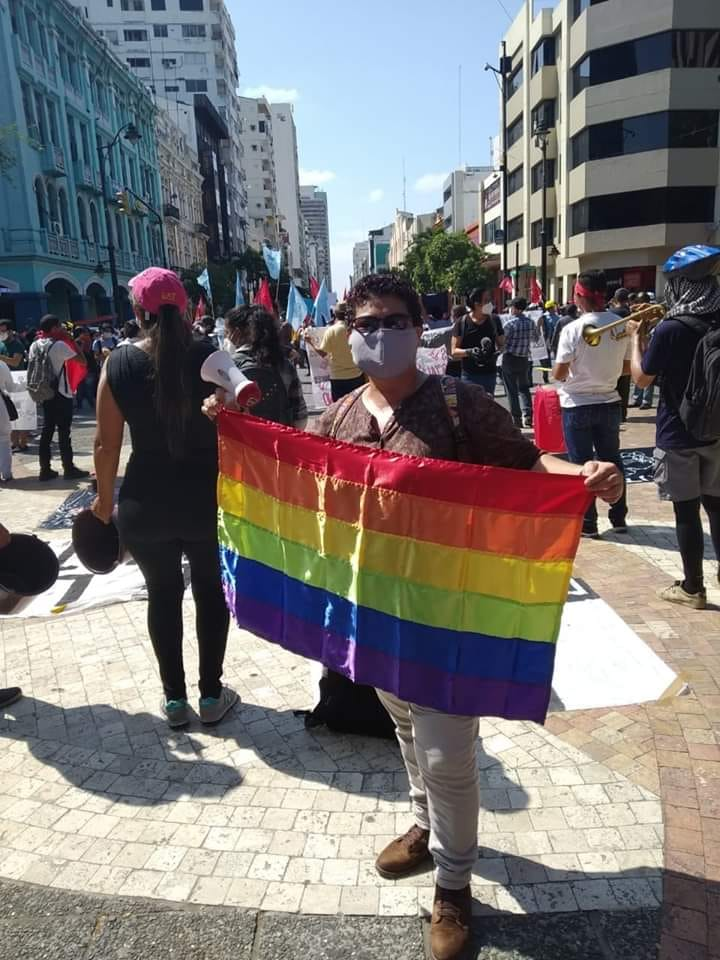
An LGBT activist during a protest in Ecuador in 2020.

The history of LGBTQ people in Ecuador includes pre-Columbian cultural practices, colonial repression, the criminalisation of same-sex sexual activity in the republican period, the emergence of organised activism in the late 20th century, and later legal changes concerning anti-discrimination protections, civil unions, gender identity and same-sex marriage.

Archaeological and ethnohistorical studies have suggested that some pre-Columbian cultures in the territory of present-day Ecuador represented same-sex relations, gender ambiguity or non-binary gender roles in ways that differed from later colonial Catholic norms. Spanish colonisation introduced legal and religious forms of repression against sexual practices condemned as sodomy. In the republican period, same-sex sexual activity was first criminalised in Ecuador in the Penal Code of 1871, during the government of Gabriel García Moreno, with a penalty of four to eight years' imprisonment.

The visibility of LGBT people increased in the 1970s and 1980s, particularly in Quito and Guayaquil, but this was accompanied by police repression, arbitrary arrests and violence. During the presidency of León Febres-Cordero from 1984 to 1988, special police units known as escuadrones volantes were accused by activists and human rights organisations of abuses against sex workers, gay men, transgender women and other people considered socially undesirable.

A decisive moment in the country's LGBT movement came after the police raid of the Abanicos bar in Cuenca on 14 June 1997. The arrests, abuses and reported sexual violence suffered by detainees led several LGBT organisations to coordinate a national campaign against the criminalisation of homosexuality. On 25 November 1997, the Constitutional Tribunal declared the first paragraph of Article 516 of the Penal Code unconstitutional, thereby decriminalising same-sex sexual activity in Ecuador.

In 1998, Ecuador included sexual orientation among the protected categories against discrimination in its Constitution. The 2008 Constitution later recognised same-sex civil unions and added gender identity as a protected category. In 2019, the Constitutional Court of Ecuador legalised same-sex marriage, ruling in favour of two constitutional cases decided on 12 June 2019.

== Pre-Columbian period ==
Archaeological interpretations of several pre-Columbian cultures of the Ecuadorian coast have identified figurines and ceramic pieces that may represent same-sex relationships, gender ambiguity or ritualised gender roles. Cultures mentioned in this context include the Valdivia culture, the Tumaco-La Tolita culture and the Bahía culture.

Archaeologist María Fernanda Ugalde has argued that some paired female figurines from the Tumaco-La Tolita and Bahía cultures have often been described as "Siamese sisters" despite appearing in positions similar to those used for heterosexual couples. Ugalde has suggested that some of these figures may instead represent female same-sex couples or non-normative gender roles.

Among Amazonian peoples, ethnographic sources have also described sexual practices and myths among the Shuar that did not necessarily associate anal sex with feminisation in the same way as European colonial categories did.

=== Huancavilca culture ===
Spanish chroniclers described the Huancavilca as one of the Indigenous groups in which same-sex practices appeared more openly than among other peoples encountered during colonisation. These descriptions were filtered through the moral and religious views of the chroniclers, who generally condemned the practices they observed.

A central figure in these accounts was the enchaquirado, a term used for men associated with the use of beads and ritual functions. According to the chronicler Pedro Cieza de León, enchaquirados served as religious figures or guardians of deities and had sexual relations with chiefs during religious festivities. Anthropologist Hugo Benavides has argued that their use of highly valued objects, including gold and Spondylus shell beads, suggests an elevated status within Huancavilca social hierarchies.

== Colonial period ==
Spanish colonial rule introduced legal persecution of sodomy in the territory of the Real Audiencia of Quito. Surviving records from the colonial period are limited, but several cases involving accusations of sodomy or same-sex relations have been studied by historians.

One of the most notable cases involved Manuel Barros de San Millán, president of the Real Audiencia of Quito from 1587 to 1593. In 1590, Andrés Cupín, a former slave of Barros who was being tried for sodomy in Lima, accused Barros of having had sexual relations with him years earlier. Barros was arrested and sent to Lima; in 1597 he was sentenced in Spain to pay a fine and was prohibited from returning to the Indies.

Several trials concerning sodomy or same-sex relations were also held in the late 18th century. Historian Lucía Moscoso has linked the increased prosecution of sexual offences in this period to Bourbon reforms and broader efforts at social control. Cases included accusations against women in Quito in 1782 and 1787, and a male sodomy case in 1788.

== Republican period and criminalisation ==
The first Penal Code of Ecuador, enacted in 1837, did not prohibit consensual same-sex sexual relations. Criminalisation began in 1871, when a new Penal Code promulgated under President Gabriel García Moreno punished male same-sex relations, described as sodomy, with four to eight years in prison when no violence or threats were involved.

The Liberal Revolution led by Eloy Alfaro at the end of the 19th century brought secular legal reforms, including civil marriage, divorce and freedom of worship. However, the 1906 Penal Code maintained the prohibition on sodomy. In 1938, the term "sodomy" was replaced by "homosexualism", extending criminalisation beyond male same-sex relations. The provision was later placed under Article 516 of the Penal Code.

During the first half of the 20th century, homosexuality was rarely discussed publicly in Ecuador. It appeared, however, in literature and public scandals. In 1926, Pablo Palacio published "Un hombre muerto a puntapiés", often identified as one of the earliest representations of male homosexuality in Ecuadorian literature. In 1930, Joaquín Gallegos Lara published "Al subir el aguaje", which has been discussed as an early literary representation of female homosexuality in Ecuador.

A widely publicised scandal occurred in 1963, after poet and diplomat Francisco Granizo shot Wilfrido Villamar in Quito. The press coverage was strongly homophobic, and police investigations led to the publication of lists of people alleged to be homosexual, affecting the employment and public lives of many of those named.

== Return to democracy and early activism ==
In the second half of the 1970s, LGBT visibility increased in Ecuador's major cities. Informal networks appeared in Quito and Guayaquil, partly due to urban migration during the oil boom and the influence of international events such as the Stonewall riots. One early group in Quito was known as the "Chicas Bolivia", formed by gay men who met in a garage on Bolivia Street; this environment later contributed to the creation of El Hueco, one of Quito's first gay discos.

Police repression also intensified. In 1979, when Abdalá Bucaram was appointed police intendant of Guayas, he led public campaigns against people he considered morally undesirable, including sex workers, gay men and transgender women. Detainees were reportedly forced to walk through the streets of Guayaquil while being insulted by bystanders.

The first case of HIV/AIDS in Ecuador was reported in 1984, at a time when the disease was strongly associated with homosexuality in public discourse. Government campaigns and media narratives often reproduced stigma against gay men and other LGBT people.

=== Police repression under León Febres-Cordero ===
During the presidency of León Febres-Cordero, the escuadrones volantes were created as elite police units. Human rights activists later described these units as responsible for arbitrary arrests, torture and sexual violence, particularly against transgender women and gay men considered effeminate by the police.

Although these units were abolished under President Rodrigo Borja in 1988, police harassment of LGBT people continued into the 1990s. Bars, discos, parks and streets used as meeting places by LGBT people became frequent sites of police raids and violence.

=== Emergence of LGBT organisations ===
The violence of the 1980s contributed to the creation of informal support networks that raised money to pay fines and secure the release of detained LGBT people. One prominent figure was Orlando Montoya, a Colombian stylist living in Ecuador, who used his social connections to help obtain the release of detainees. In 1986, Montoya appeared on Ecuadorian television to denounce hate crimes and impunity affecting sexual minorities.

On 25 December 1986, a group led by Montoya formed "Entre Amigos". With the spread of HIV/AIDS, the group shifted toward prevention work and became SOGA, later associated with FEDAEPS. These organisations established links with international LGBT organisations and became central to later campaigns for legal reform.

== Decriminalisation of homosexuality ==
In 1997, social protests, human rights activism and opposition to police abuses created a favourable context for the campaign to decriminalise homosexuality. The police raid of the Abanicos bar in Cuenca became the immediate catalyst for national coordination among LGBT organisations.

The raid occurred on 14 June 1997, during an event at an LGBT bar in Cuenca. Several people were detained, and detainees later reported abuse, torture and sexual violence while in custody. The events were taken up by activists as evidence of the dangers created by criminalisation.

Organisations including FEDAEPS, Coccinelle, Famivida and Tolerancia formed a coalition known as Triángulo Andino. They decided to file an unconstitutionality claim against Article 516 of the Penal Code and gathered more than the required number of supporting signatures. The collection of signatures marked one of the first times that LGBT people in Ecuador visibly occupied public spaces for political purposes.

On 24 September 1997, the claim was filed before the Constitutional Tribunal as Case No. 111-97-TC. The arguments included that homosexuality was neither a crime nor a disease, that criminalisation violated constitutional rights, and that sexual rights were human rights.

On 25 November 1997, the Constitutional Tribunal unanimously declared the first paragraph of Article 516 unconstitutional. The decision was published in the Official Registry two days later and ended the criminalisation of consensual same-sex relations in Ecuador.

== Constitution of 1998 ==
After decriminalisation, LGBT organisations participated in debates surrounding the 1998 Constitution. They advocated for sexual orientation to be included among the protected categories against discrimination. The proposal was adopted in Article 23, making Ecuador one of the first countries in the world to include sexual orientation as a constitutionally protected category.

Proposals concerning broader recognition of diverse family forms were more controversial and were not approved. However, the inclusion of sexual orientation in the constitutional text became a major legal basis for later claims against discrimination.

== Twenty-first century ==
During the early 2000s, LGBT visibility grew in media, culture and public life, though discrimination and police abuses continued. In 2000, an attempted LGBT pride march in Guayaquil organised by Famivida was dispersed by police using tear gas, according to Amnesty International.

In Quito, local advocacy led to the approval of an anti-discrimination ordinance in 2007, making the city one of the first in Ecuador to adopt local protections for LGBT people.

In cultural life, the 2000s saw increased representation of LGBT people in literature, radio, television and film. Examples include the radio programme Voces de la diversidad, the LGBT film festival El Lugar Sin Límites, and novels such as Salvo el calvario by Lucrecia Maldonado and Eses fatales by Sonia Manzano.

== Constitution of 2008 and later reforms ==
The 2008 Constitution of Ecuador recognised the family "in its diverse types", included gender identity and sexual orientation among protected categories against discrimination, and recognised same-sex civil unions. Article 68 granted stable and monogamous unions between two people the same rights and obligations as marriage, except for joint adoption, which remained limited to different-sex couples.

After the adoption of the Constitution, reforms to criminal law established penalties for discrimination and hate crimes based on sexual orientation and other protected categories. Same-sex civil unions began to be registered, although activists continued to criticise administrative barriers and inconsistent implementation.

In 2015, the National Assembly approved reforms allowing de facto unions to be recorded as a civil status and permitting transgender people to request that the sex field on their identity card be replaced by gender. The reform was celebrated by some activists as an advance, while others criticised it for creating different forms of identification for cisgender and transgender people.

== Conversion therapy and detention centres ==
In the 2000s and 2010s, Ecuadorian lesbian and feminist organisations denounced the existence of so-called clinics that claimed to "cure" homosexuality. These centres, often operating as drug rehabilitation facilities, were accused of holding people against their will and subjecting them to abuse and torture. Activist Carina Vance, who became Minister of Public Health in 2012, had previously denounced these centres and later oversaw actions against some of them.

In 2012, Ministerial Agreement No. 767 prohibited the offering or practice of sexual reorientation therapies. Later, the Organic Integral Penal Code treated such practices as an aggravating circumstance in cases of torture.

== Same-sex marriage and constitutional rulings ==
The campaign for same-sex marriage in Ecuador began publicly in 2013, when activist Pamela Troya and her partner requested a marriage appointment at the Civil Registry and were denied. Later cases relied heavily on the 2018 advisory opinion of the Inter-American Court of Human Rights, which held that states party to the American Convention on Human Rights should recognise same-sex marriage.

On 12 June 2019, the Constitutional Court of Ecuador ruled in cases 11-18-CN and 10-18-CN in favour of same-sex marriage. The rulings were approved by narrow five-to-four majorities and came into force upon publication in the Official Registry on 8 July 2019.

The first same-sex marriage in Ecuador took place on 18 July 2019 in Guayaquil, between Michelle Avilés and Alexandra Chávez. The first marriage between two men was registered one week later, also in Guayaquil.

== 2020s ==
In 2021, President Guillermo Lasso created the Subsecretariat of Diversity, the first public body in Ecuador created specifically to address problems affecting LGBT populations. The same year, the National Assembly ratified the Inter-American Convention against All Forms of Discrimination and Intolerance, a regional instrument that explicitly recognises sexual orientation, gender identity and gender expression as protected categories.

Openly LGBT political representation also increased. In 2023, José Arroyo Cabrera was elected mayor of Pujilí canton and was described by Ecuadorian press as the first openly LGBT person elected mayor in the country's history.

The security crisis that affected Ecuador in the 2020s also had consequences for LGBT people, especially transgender women involved in sex work. Activist organisations reported killings, extortion and sexual exploitation by criminal groups, although the available figures often come from civil society monitoring rather than official state statistics.

== See also ==
- Timeline of LGBTQ history in Ecuador
- LGBTQ rights in Ecuador
- Decriminalization of homosexuality in Ecuador
- Same-sex marriage in Ecuador
- LGBT rights in the Americas
