= Eva García Pastor =

Andorran politician

Personal details
- Born: 27 September 1976 (age 49)
- Party: Liberal Party of Andorra

Eva García Pastor (born 27 September 1976) is an Andorran politician. She is a member of the Liberal Party of Andorra. She was first elected to the General Council in 2005 and served until 2009.
