= International University of Andalucía =

Public university in Andalusia, Spain

Coordinates: 37.3985°N 6.0073°W

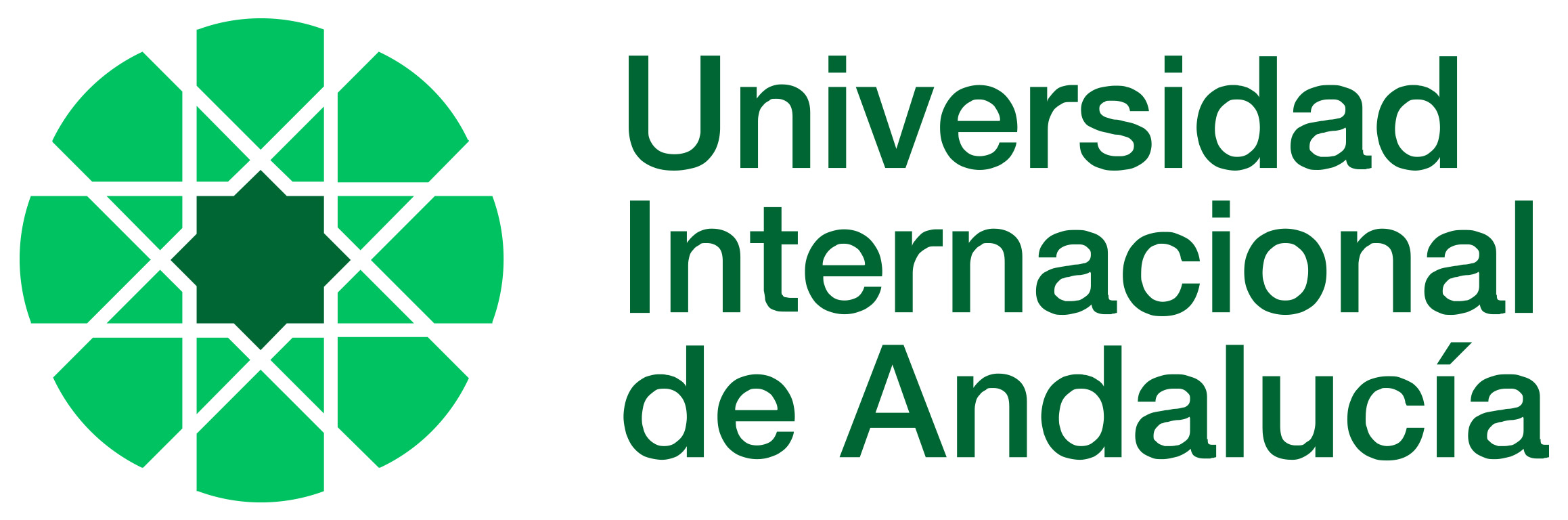
- Motto: Expanding Knowledge
- Type: Public, Postgraduate and Specialty
- Established: 1994; 32 years ago
- Location: Seville, Andalusia, Spain

The International University of Andalucía (Spanish: Universidad Internacional de Andalucía) or UNIA is a university in Andalusia, set up in 1994 to complete the region's educational system. It offers postgraduate and specialty courses. It has campuses in four Andalusian provinces: Huelva, Jaén, Málaga, and Seville.

UNIA has campuses in four cities in Andalusia: Baeza, La Rábida, Málaga, and Sevilla. Each campus has its own specific focus and facilities, and all of them offer a range of programs and services to students, researchers, and the wider community.

The university offers postgraduate programs in a wide range of fields, including humanities, social sciences, law, engineering, health sciences, and natural sciences. These programs are designed to meet the needs of both Spanish and international students.

== Campuses ==
UNIA has campuses in four of the provinces of Andalusia:

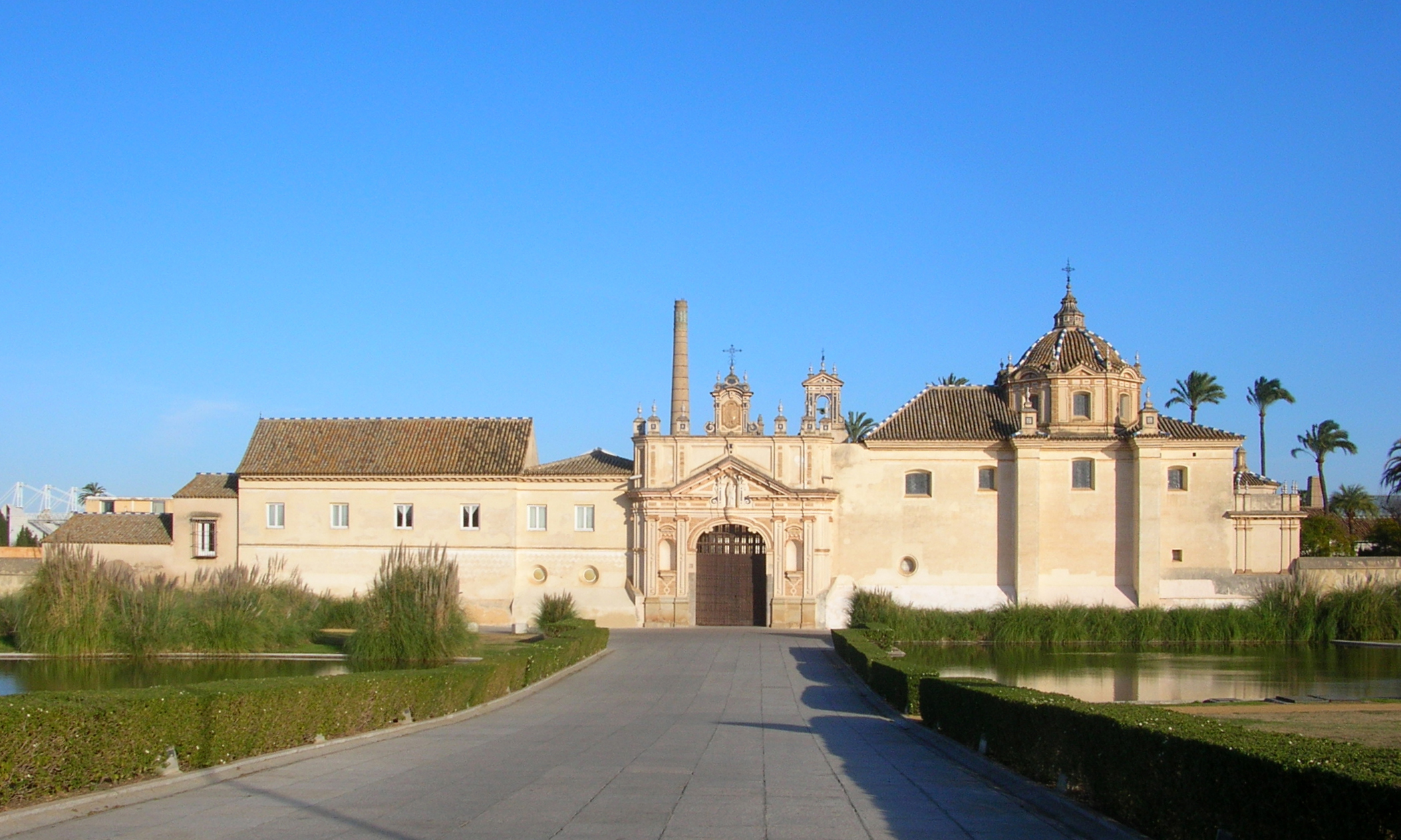
Santa María de las Cuevas Campus in La Cartuja Monastery, Seville

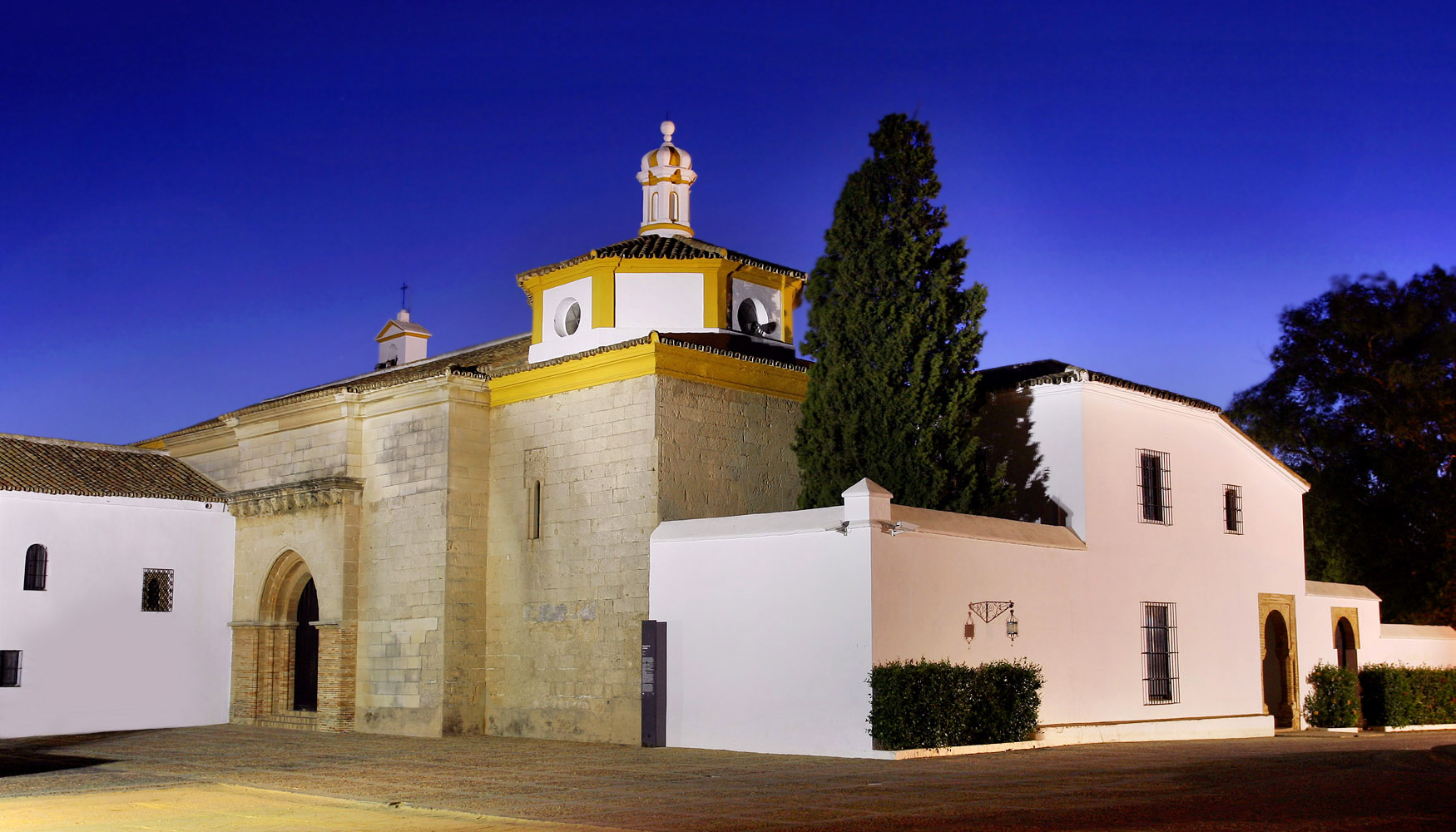
Santa Maria de La Rábida Campus, Palos de la Frontera (Huelva)

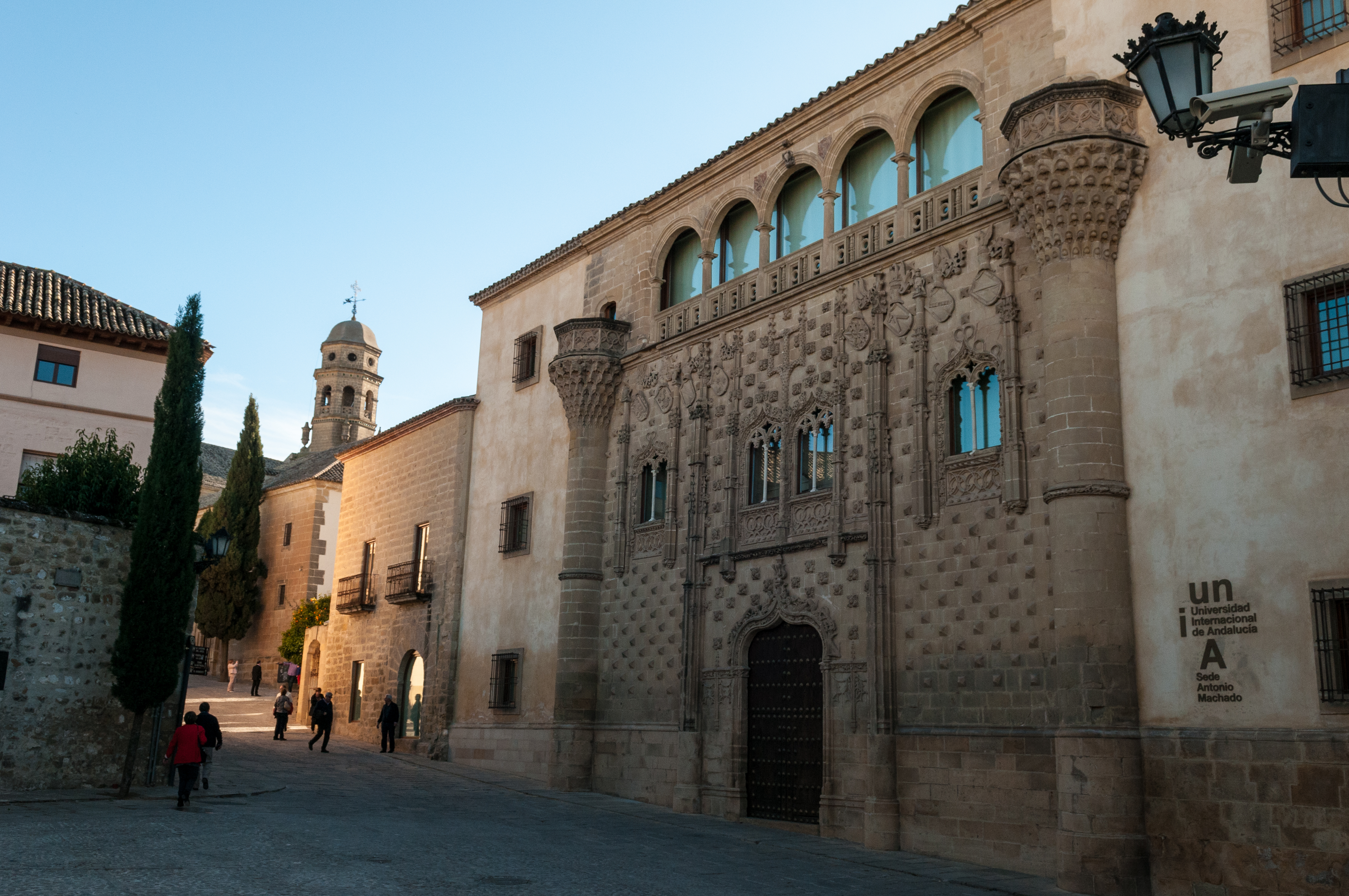
Antonio Machado Campus, Baeza (Jaén)

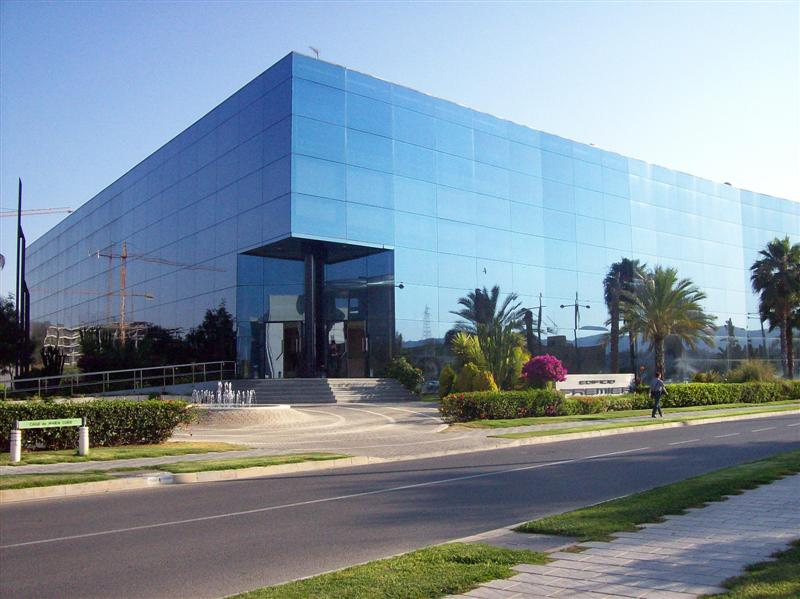
Technological Campus in the PTA, Málaga
