= Metropolitan Mayor of Quito =

Head of the executive branch of the Metropolitan District of Quito

- Alcalde Metropolitano de Quito
- Coat of Arms of Quito

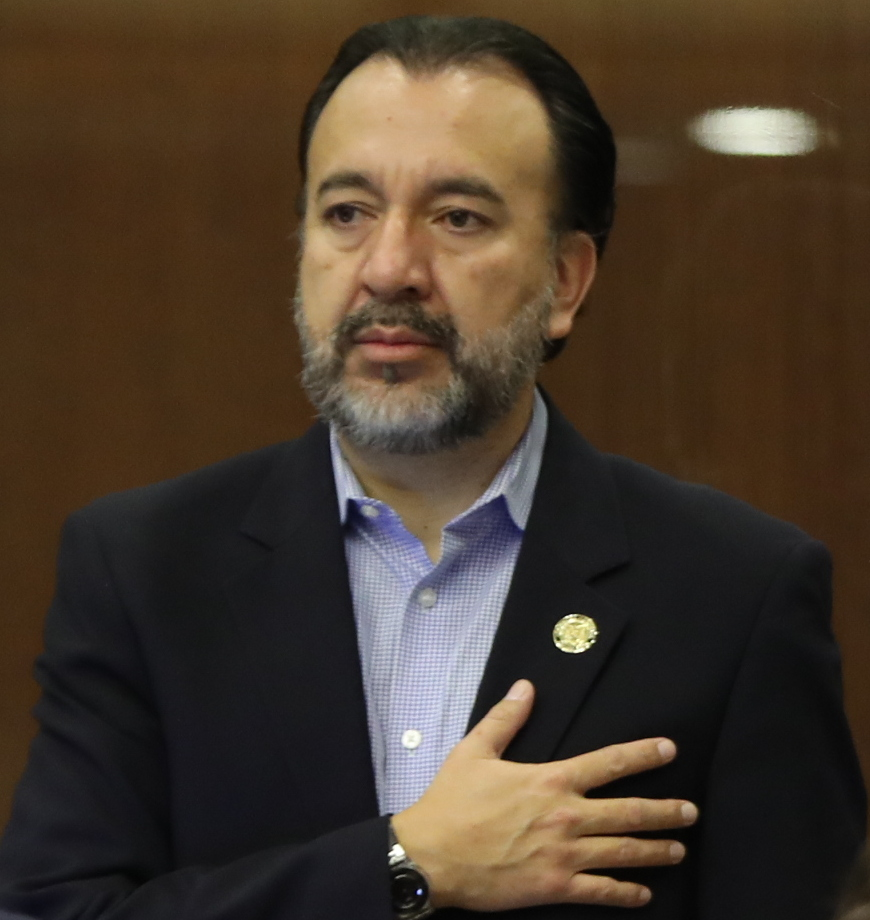
- Incumbent; Pabel Muñoz since 14 May 2023
- Term length: 4 years
- Formation: 1946
- Website: www.quito.gob.ec

The Metropolitan Mayor of Quito (Spanish: Alcalde Metropolitano de Quito) is the head of the executive branch of the Metropolitan District of Quito, and is the highest-ranking official on the Council of the Metropolitan Municipal District of Quito, which is the chief legislative body of the city and canton. The Council consists of the mayor and 15 other council members, each of whom is elected to their position by a general election of the people of Quito for a term of four years. Members may be re-elected.

== Mayor ==
The Metropolitan Mayor of Quito is the highest administrative and political authority of the Metropolitan District of Quito. He is the President of the Metropolitan Council and representative of the Metropolitan Government.

The current Mayor is Pabel Muñoz who has been in office since 14 May 2023.

== History of the office ==
In Quito the first use of the title of mayor, or alcalde in Spanish, was established in 1946. Since then, 24 men have held the position with an average time in office of just over 3 years.

Prior to 1946, and dating back to the mid-18th century, the chief executive was known only as President of the Metropolitan Council of Quito.

In 1993, under the administration of Mayor Jamil Mahuad, the title was renamed to "Metropolitan Mayor" due to the enactment of the Regime Law for the Metropolitan District of Quito.

== List of mayors of Quito ==
Name	First Year	Final Year	Notes
Pabel Muñoz	2023		Chosen as a pre-candidate by the Citizen Revolution Movement to participate in the 2023 local elections. In those elections, he won with 25.18% of the votes, becoming the elected Metropolitan Mayor of Quito.
Santiago Guarderas	2021	2023	Succession by removal of Jorge Yunda.
Jorge Yunda	2019	2021	On September 29, the Constitutional Court accepted the protection action filed by Guarderas, nullifying the judicial rulings favorable to Yunda.
Mauricio Esteban Rodas Espinel	2014	2019	
Augusto Barrera Guarderas	2009	2014	
Andrés Vallejo Arcos	2009	2009	Assumed mayorship when Paco Moncayo resigned to run for congress.
Paco Moncayo Gallegos	2000	2009	
Roque Sevilla	1998	2000	Assumed mayorship when Jamil Mahuad became President of Ecuador.
Jamil Mahuad	1992	1998	
Rodrigo Paz Delgado	1988	1992	
Gustavo Herdoíza	1984	1988	
Luis Andrade Nieto	1982	1984	
Álvaro Pérez	1978	1982	
Sixto Durán Ballén	1970	1978	
Jaime del Castillo Álvarez	1967	1970	
Luis Pallares Zaldumbide	1966	1967	
Luis Román Pérez	1965	1966	
Gonzalo Pérez Bustamante	1963	1965	
Jorge Vallarino Donoso	1962	1963	
Julio Moreno Espinoza	1959	1962	
Carlos Andrade Marín	1955	1959	
Rafael León Larrea	1952	1954	
José Ricardo Chiriboga Villagómez	1949	1951	
Alfonso Pérez Pallares	1948	1949	
Jacinto Jijón y Caamaño	1946	1947	
