= Eva García Fabre =

Ecuadoran politician and diplomat

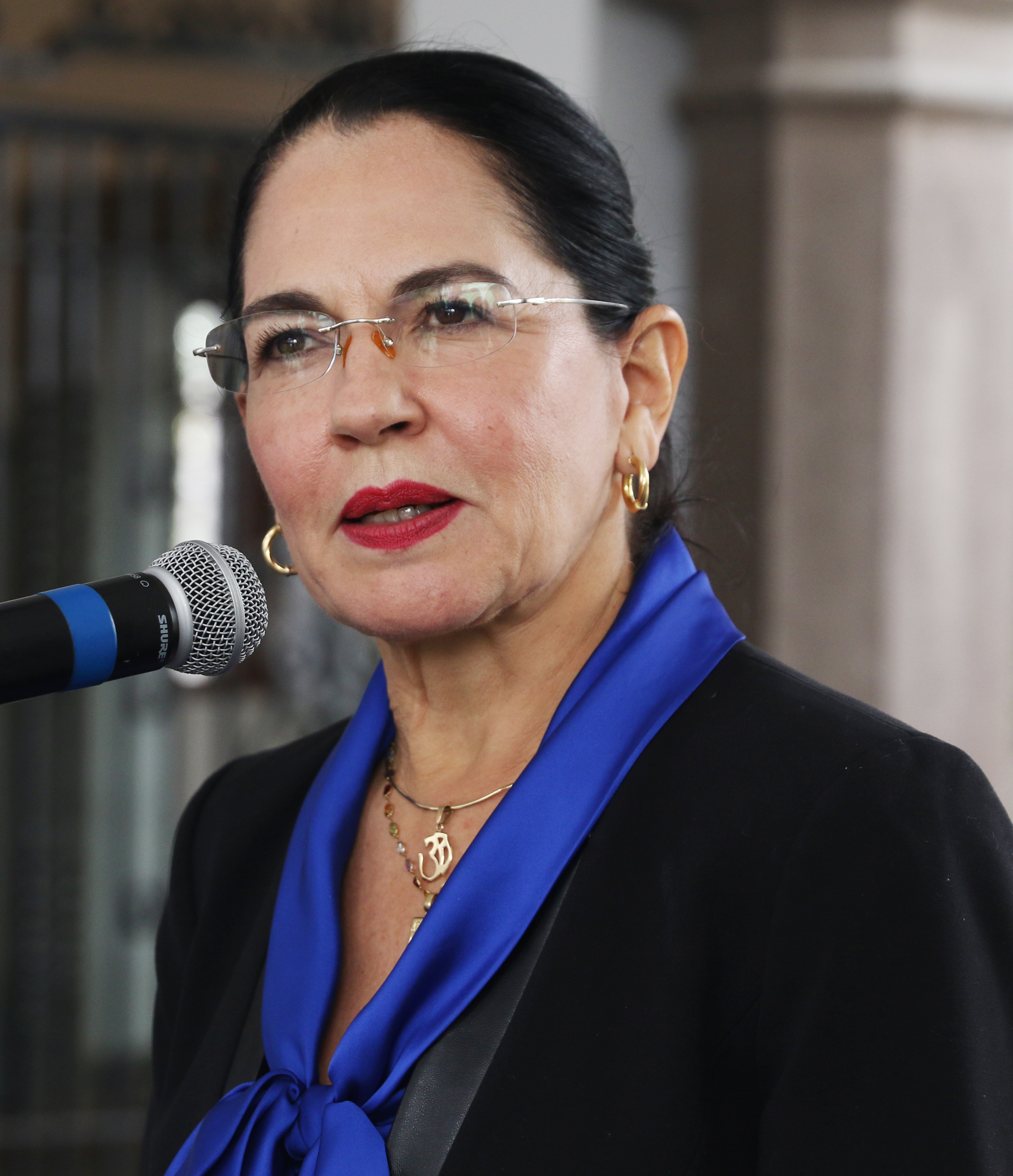
- Eva García Fabre in 2018

Ambassador of Ecuador to Peru
- In office March 8, 2019 – May 24, 2021
- President: Lenín Moreno

Minister of Industries and Productivity
- In office May 24, 2017 – August 23, 2018
- President: Lenín Moreno
- Preceded by: Santiago León
- Succeeded by: Pablo Campana

Personal details
- Born: Eva Irene de los Ángeles García Fabre; August 2, 1953 (age 72) Guayaquil, Ecuador
- Party: Democratic Left
- Education: University of Guayaquil
- Occupation: Businesswoman, diplomat, politician

Eva Irene de los Ángeles García Fabre (born August 2, 1953), is an Ecuadorian businesswoman, diplomat, and politician, currently serving as her country's ambassador to Peru.

== Biography ==
Eva García Fabre was born in Guayaquil on August 2, 1953. She graduated from the University of Guayaquil with a degree in economics, and completed a master's in international business and foreign trade. She worked as director of economic studies and foreign trade for the Guayaquil Chamber of Commerce from 1990 to 2004.

In 2002, she was a candidate on the Democratic Left's presidential ticket, together with Rodrigo Borja.

In 2005, she became Ecuador's permanent representative to the World Trade Organization in Geneva.

In 2017, President Lenín Moreno appointed her Minister of Industries and Productivity. After Vice President Jorge Glas was sentenced to prison for his role in the Odebrecht scandal, Moreno delegated her the presidency of the Production Sector Council, which is in charge of regulating public policies for production and industry at the national level.

On August 23, 2018, Eva García Fabre resigned as minister.

On September 3, 2018, she became general manager of the Bank of the Ecuadorian Social Security Institute (BIESS).

President Moreno named her Ecuador's ambassador to Peru on March 8, 2019.
