= Gloria Gallardo (politician) =

Ecuadorian politician and journalist

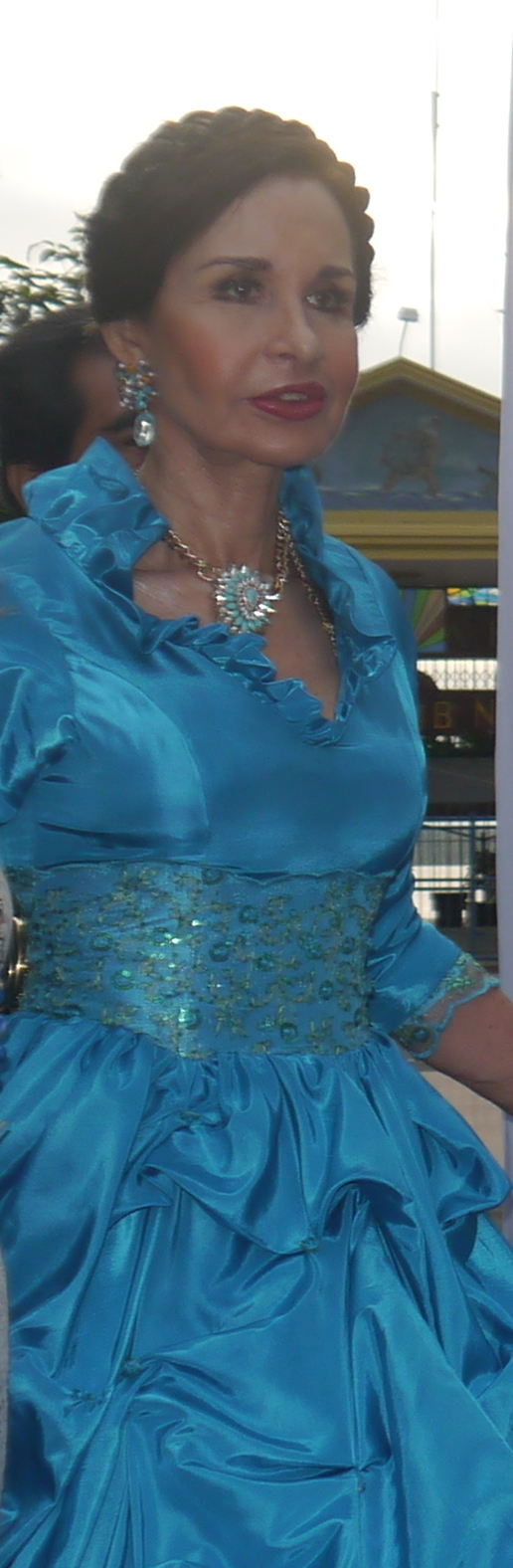
Gloria Gallardo

Gloria Ana Gallardo Zavala is an Ecuadorian politician and former journalist.

Gallardo was formerly a news director of Ecuavisa. She was a civic promoter of the mayoralty of León Febres Cordero in Guayaquil, from 1992 to 2000. She participated on behalf of the Social Christian Party as a candidate for the Constituent Assembly of Ecuador in 1997 and 1998, and was appointed one of the assembly members with the highest number of votes. In 2000 she was elected councilor of the municipality of Guayaquil, a position to which she resigned four days later to run for vice president together with Osvaldo Hurtado.

Later, Gallardo won a seat in the National Congress of Ecuador after the legislative elections, representing PRIAN, but was dismissed one year later by the Supreme Electoral Tribunal of Ecuador. She is currently the Director of Tourism and Civic Promotion of Guayaquil municipality.
