= LGBTQ people in Guayaquil =

LGBTQ history in Guayaquil, Ecuador

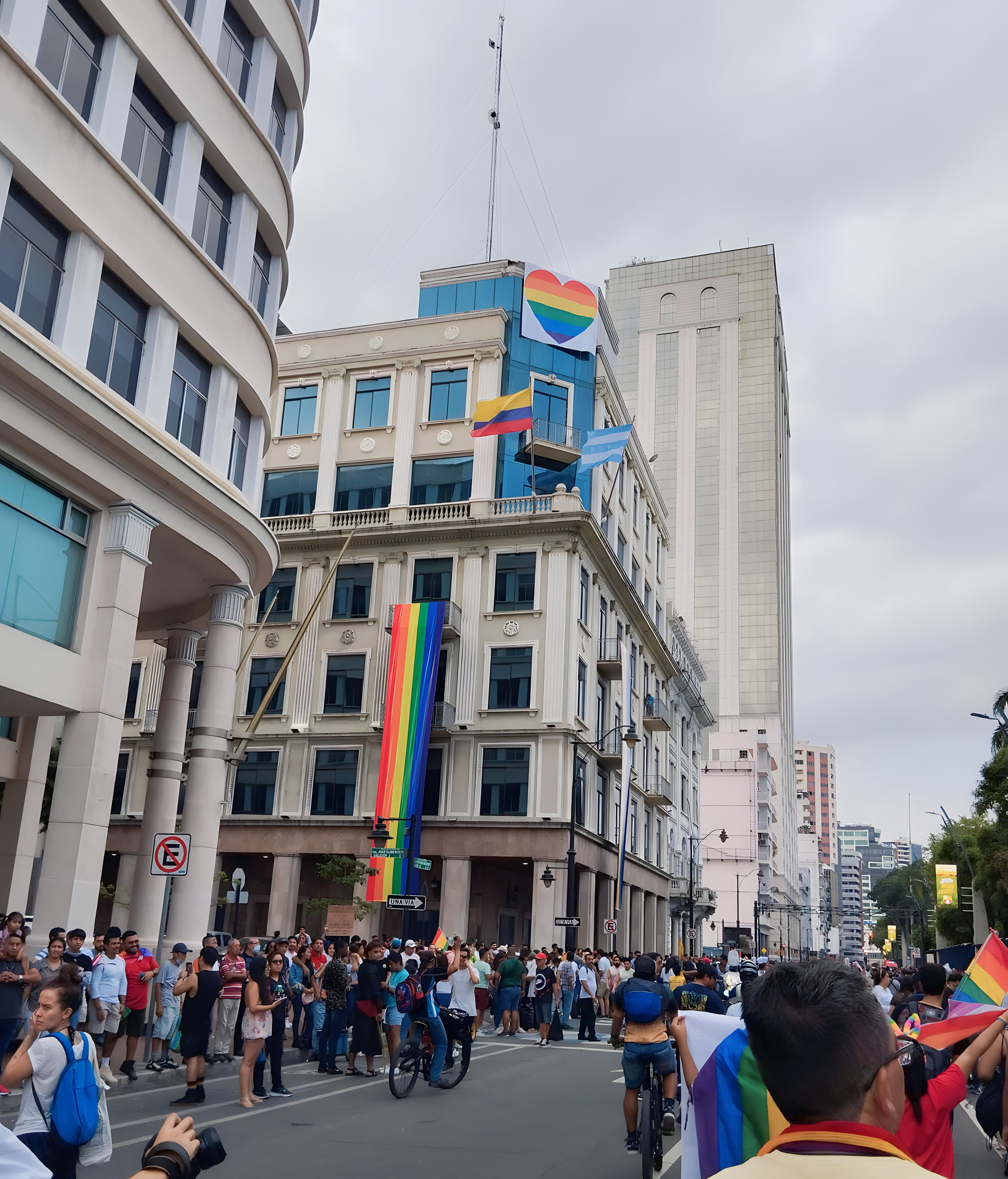
The Government of Guayas building adorned with pride flags in downtown Guayaquil.

LGBTQ in Guayaquil encompasses the various expressions of sexuality and gender of the LGBTQ people who have lived in the Ecuadorian city of Guayaquil throughout its history. According to the 2022 Ecuadorian Population and Housing Census, Guayaquil is the city with the highest number of people in the country who openly identify as lesbian, gay, bisexual, transgender, and/or intersex (LGBTI), and events like Guayaquil Pride annually attract tens of thousands of people. The city has numerous nightlife establishments catering to an LGBTQ audience, although deficiencies are noted in the availability of other tourist and cultural options focused on sexual diversity.

Social acceptance of LGBTQ people has increased considerably in recent decades, to the point where today there are legal protections, both nationally and locally, that protect sexually diverse people. However, acts of discrimination still occur and, according to a 2022 survey by the consultancy firm Ipsos, LGBTI people are less accepted in Guayaquil compared to other Ecuadorian cities like Quito.

Before the 1970s, there was little visibility of homosexuality in the city, although figures of diverse sexuality from Guayaquil did emerge, such as the poet David Ledesma Vázquez. The return to democracy coincided with an increase in the visibility of LGBTQ people, although this brought with it an intensification of persecution of these groups by local and national authorities. These policies became particularly palpable during the government of President León Febres-Cordero Ribadeneyra (1984–1988), during which arrests and violence against homosexual, transgender, or any man displaying characteristics considered "effeminate" became widespread.

The decriminalization of homosexuality in Ecuador, approved in 1997, reduced discrimination against this group in the city; however, segregation persisted during the early years of the 21st century, particularly by the municipal authorities themselves, who used to prohibit LGBTQ people from entering public spaces, such as Malecón 2000, under the purported argument of "protecting morality and good customs". During this time, LGBTQ activists repeatedly tried to obtain permits to hold a pride march in the city, but the authorities refused. However, in 2008, the first Guayaquil Pride March was finally held, and it has since become a massive event.

The 2010s marked a shift in the attitude of municipal authorities towards sexual diversity, who began to lend their support to LGBTQ events and position Guayaquil as a city of respect. Since then, important rights gains have been achieved for sexually diverse populations in the city, such as the approval in 2017 of an ordinance to prohibit all types of discrimination based on gender reasons or the celebration, starting in 2019, of the first same-sex marriages.

In addition to the pride march, Guayaquil is currently the scene of various annual events focused on sexually diverse populations, such as the El Lugar Sin Límites International LGBT Film Festival and the National Trans March. LGBTQ organizations such as Asociación Silueta X, Alianza Igualitaria, Mujer & Mujer, and Casa de las Muñecas have their main headquarters in the city, which also hosts permanent performances by local drag artists.

== History ==
Thanks to records kept in the National Archive of Ecuador, a case of sodomy in Guayaquil is known that was tried by the Royal Audiencia of Quito before Ecuador achieved its independence from Spain. The event occurred in 1779 and was brought to a judge of the audience by prosecutor Juan José de Villalengua, who accused a man named Pascual Cárdenas of the "nefarious sin". Cárdenas, who was originally from Cuzco, had previously been expelled from Lima after receiving accusations of having "bad conduct" and "perverse inclinations". According to the accusation, the "nefarious sin" would have also involved Francisco de Ugarte, a former Governor of Guayaquil.

Well into the 20th century, the years before the return to democracy (1978) were characterized by the low visibility of LGBTQ people in the city. However, some Guayaquil natives whose homosexuality was known have survived to the present day. Among them was the poet David Ledesma Vásquez (1934–1961), who, due to his sexual orientation, was placed by his father in a clinic in Lima where he underwent conversion therapy. Ledesma ended up committing suicide at the age of 27. Also homosexual within Ledesma's poetic group was the writer Carlos Benavides Vega, as well as the journalist and playwright José Guerra Castillo, with whom Ledesma collaborated on some theatrical productions. Other homosexual figures from Guayaquil in the 1950s were the politicians Jorge Maldonado Renella and Enrique Arbuiza.

During the 1960s, the military authorities began a campaign of social "moralization" which targeted, among others, cross-dressing girls and gay men with features considered feminine. Those detained were then accused of some false crime and imprisoned in the Penitenciaría del Litoral or the Quinto Guayas Infantry Battalion, where they were sometimes assaulted or raped by other inmates.

=== Return to democracy ===
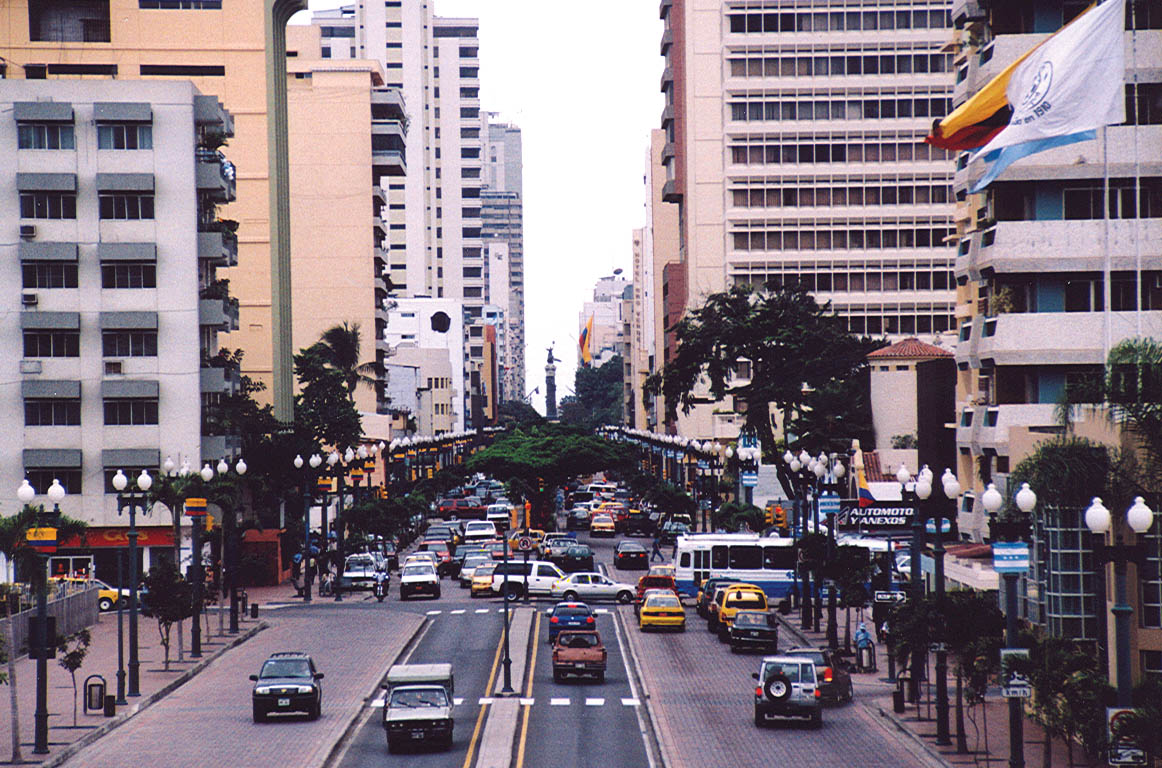
Avenida Nueve de Octubre was traditionally used as a meeting place for LGBTQ people.

The era of the return to democracy (1978) was accompanied by an increase in the visibility of LGBTQ people in the country, caused, among other reasons, by the impact of international events like the Stonewall riots and migrations to large cities as a consequence of the oil boom. Because of this, LGBTQ people from different provinces began to migrate to Quito and Guayaquil. At this time, the first clandestine LGBTQ bars appeared in the city. Transgender women engaged in sex work frequented Calle 18, as well as Primero de Mayo. Another area frequented by the Guayaquil LGBTQ population was Avenida Nueve de Octubre.

The increase in LGBTQ visibility during these years increased persecution and arrests by law enforcement. One of the most publicized cases of abuse occurred after the appointment in 1979 of Abdalá Bucaram as Intendant of Police for Guayas. After being appointed, Bucaram published a manifesto known as "The sixteen commandments of Abdalá" in which he denounced all the people he considered morally reprehensible, as a form of public shaming against them. Shortly after, he carried out a police raid in Guayaquil detaining sex workers, gay men, and transgender women. He then summoned citizens to the streets and forced the detainees to walk 25 blocks, from the Cuartel Modelo to the Municipal Palace, a route during which bystanders insulted them and threw objects at them. In the following years, Bucaram continued to commit abuses and, in January 1980, forbade any man from having long hair, initiating operations in Guayaquil where police would cut the hair of anyone found violating the order.

This negative view of sexual diversity was reproduced by the local press. An example of this occurred in an article that appeared in the late 1970s in the magazine Caskabel Internacional, which offered a scandalous view of lesbianism and described it as a threat proliferating in Guayaquil. The text, titled "Lesbianism: Danger looming over Guayaquil", presented four testimonies of supposed lesbian women pointing to "hatred of men" and sexual dissatisfaction as possible causes of their "deviances".

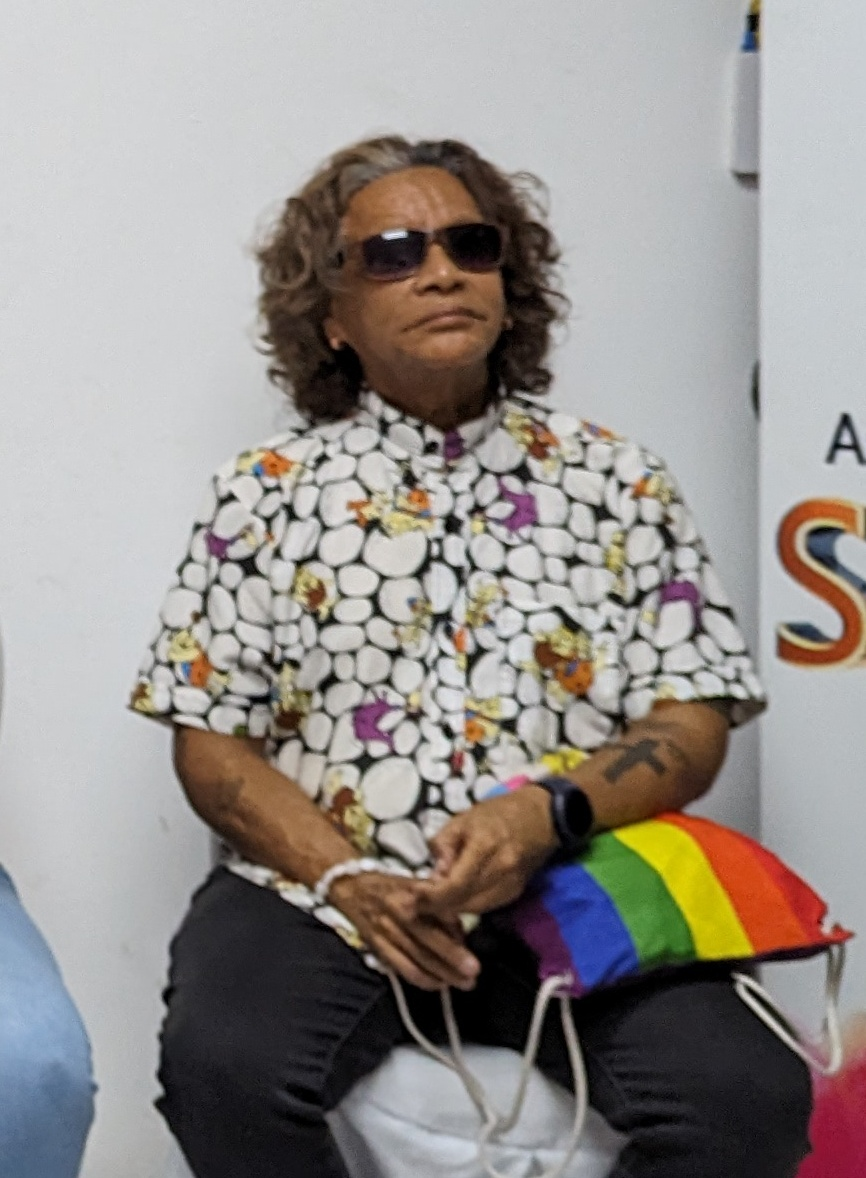
Fernando Orozco

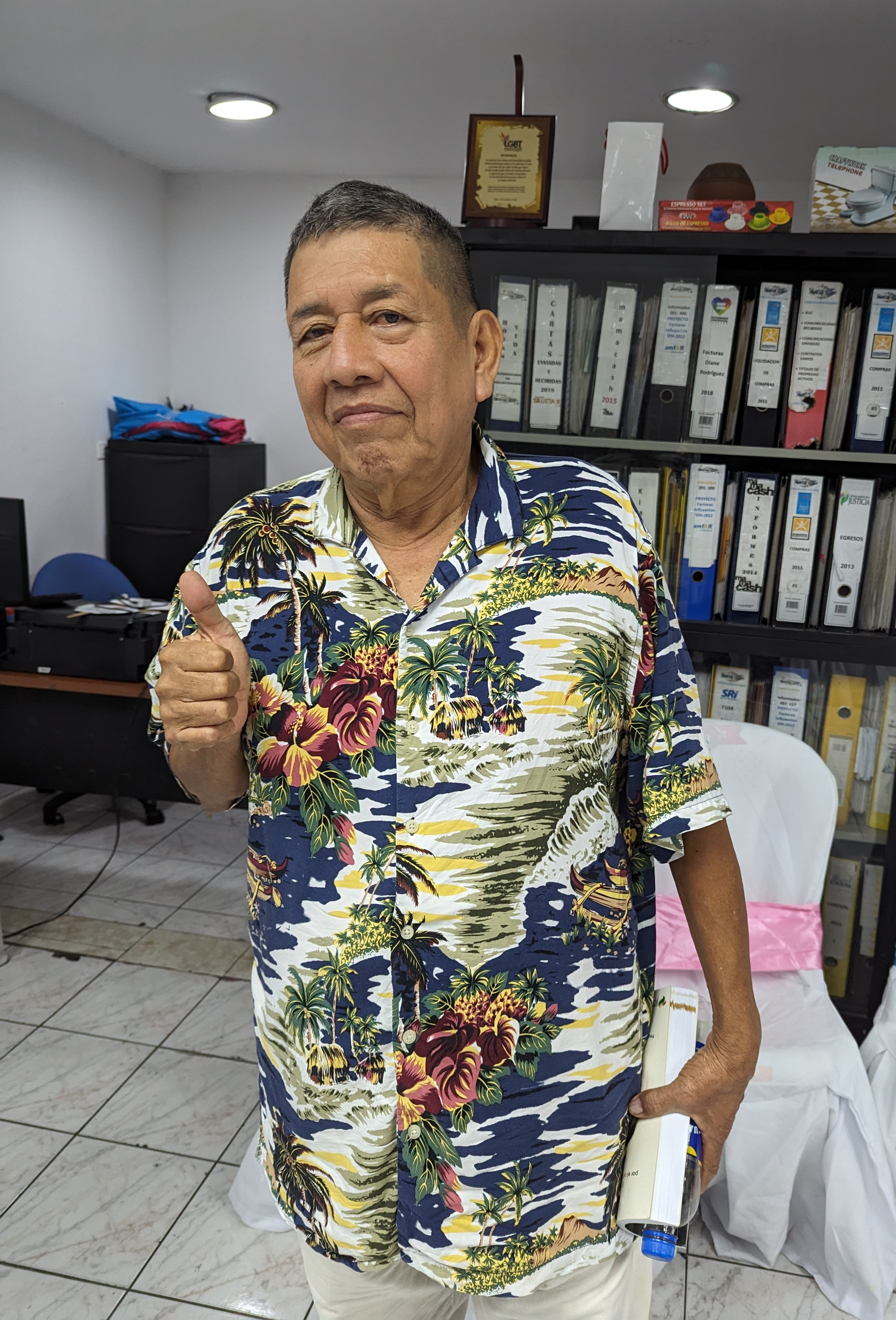
Gonzalo Abarca

LGBT activists who lived in Guayaquil during the era of the flying squads.

Repression against LGBTQ people intensified during the government of conservative President León Febres-Cordero Ribadeneyra (1984–1988). On May 23, 1985, Febres-Cordero created the so-called Flying Squads, a group of elite police forces that committed systematic human rights violations and acts of torture against people they considered undesirable, including sex workers, people from LGBTQ populations, or any man with characteristics they deemed "effeminate". Activist Gonzalo Abarca recounted that transgender women in particular were beaten, raped, and tortured. As part of a report presented by the Inter-American Commission on Human Rights, Mabell García, a trans activist and torture survivor, recalled that they were often taken to the Cuartel Modelo and forced to "commit aberrant acts" for wearing female clothing. Another testimony was related by Guayaquil activist Fernando Orozco, who in 1986 was detained by police for his sexual orientation, after which he was blindfolded, beaten, and left in a cell with dangerous prisoners, where he was sexually abused.

=== 1990s ===
In late 1989, the body of Wendy Calle was found in Guayaquil, a transgender woman whose death sparked interest in the country when it was revealed that she had undergone gender reassignment surgery. Furthermore, Calle's murder marked the beginning of a series of transphobic attacks during the early 1990s centered on Calle Primero de Mayo that went unpunished. During the attacks, transgender women were kidnapped, beaten, and in some cases, murdered. They were then abandoned on the Vía Perimetral. Because homosexuality was still a crime in the country, survivors did not report the events for fear of being arrested.

On August 15, 1995, the Fundación Amigos por la Vida (Famivida) was officially registered. It was the first LGBTQ organization in the history of Guayaquil, although initially it was registered as an organization for HIV/AIDS prevention, without mentioning the defense of LGBTQ rights, also because of the law criminalizing homosexuality in Ecuador.

After the Abanicos bar raid, a police incursion in June 1997 at an LGBTQ bar in Cuenca where several detainees suffered abuse and rape, activists from Famivida joined the LGBTQ groups Fedaeps, Coccinelle, and Tolerancia to form a unified front with the goal of achieving decriminalization of homosexuality in Ecuador. After agreeing to file a constitutionality challenge against the article criminalizing homosexuality, they began a campaign to collect signatures of support, a fundamental requirement to file the lawsuit. As a result of the campaign, on September 17, the first public demonstration of LGBTQ people in the history of Guayaquil took place in front of the Court of Justice. Among the important figures in the signature collection in the city were chef Gino Molinari, as well as activist Ángelo Anastacio, in whose house, located in the Martha de Roldós citadel, meetings between activists were held. On November 25, 1997, the Constitutional Tribunal annulled the first clause of Article 516 of the Penal Code, thereby decriminalizing homosexuality in Ecuador.

=== 2000s ===
Although the last years of the 20th century brought a series of legal victories for Ecuadorian LGBTQ populations, including the decriminalization of homosexuality in 1997 and the inclusion of sexual orientation as a protected category against discrimination in the 1998 Constitution, LGBTQ people in Guayaquil continued to suffer acts of discrimination by authorities during the early years of the 21st century.

A case documented in a report by Amnesty International occurred on June 28, 2000, when about 300 people, organized by the foundation Famivida, attempted to hold a pride march for the first time in the city, but were dispersed by a group of 60 police officers who threw tear gas at them. After being dispersed by the police, many of those present escaped to the LGBTQ bar Judah, but police arrived shortly after and carried out a raid along with cameramen from the television network Canal Uno, who filmed the detainees. In the following years, activists requested permission from the city's mayor, Jaime Nebot, to hold a pride march, but repeatedly the mayor refused, asserting that "society was not prepared" for that type of event.

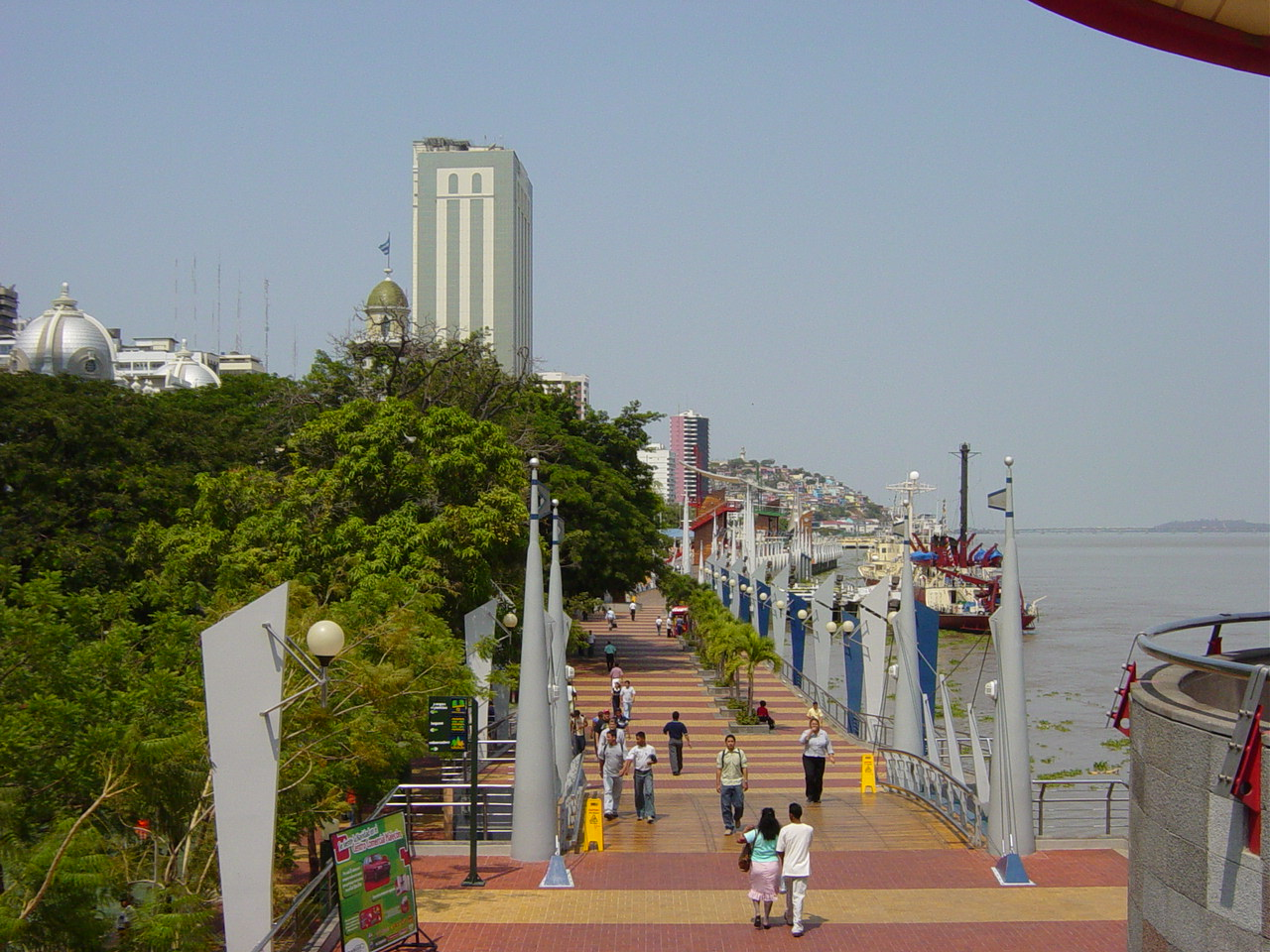
Malecón 2000 was one of the sites from which LGBTQ people were expelled as a supposed defense of "good customs".

During those years, the city was governed by members of the Social Christian Party, who had begun a process of urban regeneration that saw the creation of several foundations co-financed by the private sector that came to administer tourist attractions, including Malecón 2000. These foundations were made up of conservative members of the city's elites who began to exercise control over the public spaces they administered based on their conceptions of "morality and good customs". Thus, in places like Malecón 2000, signs were placed indicating that "Malecón reserves the right of admission". In practice, the authorities began to prohibit the entry of people they considered undesirable, including visible LGBTQ people, as well as cisgender women engaged in sex work and informal vendors.

In 2001, the city council published an internal regulation on access to the regenerated area of Cerro Santa Ana which indicated in its article 9, as one of the reasons to prohibit entry to the site: "Remaining or wandering with clothing that offends decency and good customs", which was used by municipal guards to expel LGBTQ people whose clothing revealed their sexual orientation or gender identity. In January 2004, the council approved the Regulatory Ordinance for the Urban Regeneration Zone of the City Center, which included the same phrase regarding clothing and good customs, this time to be applied throughout the regenerated area of the city center.

Arbitrary detention of transgender women also increased after the implementation of the municipal plan known as Más Seguridad, which included constant patrolling of downtown areas to prevent crime, but in practice served to remove "undesirable" people. Usually, detained transgender women would then face false accusations of supposedly disturbing public order.

In April 2003, the foundation Famivida, through its executive director, activist Neptalí Arias, reported that the director of the surveillance department of the Guayaquil municipality, Andrés Roche, had sent a letter to Mayor Jaime Nebot requesting approval of a:

Prohibition for gays and homosexuals to pass through the new sites [and] that it will constantly implement control operations on Nueve de Octubre, surrounding areas and zones subjected to urban regeneration for those who publicly offend modesty with indecent actions or words and for going out dressed indecently on public roads.

In response to the accusation, Roche stated that his letter should not be read as "a radical norm" and that LGBTQ people could "circulate whenever they want, but what is prohibited is prostitution on the streets." Figures from the Guayaquil elites showed support for the prohibition, such as historian Efrén Avilés Pino, who stated, "the gays here promote scandal! rowdiness! (...) what was sought was to prevent the malecón from becoming a site of seven faggots where there were queen contests." As a result of the complaints, human rights organizations and the press began to collect testimonies of abuse, and journalist Carlos Vera questioned Mayor Nebot if he did not know that homosexuality had been decriminalized, to which the mayor replied: "for me, homosexuality is decriminalized inside their homes, but not downtown".

Discrimination also came from the national government. In July 2005, the Governor of Guayas, Guido Chiriboga, initiated a permanent police operation called "Caballero Rosa", with the aim of "eradicating the presence of travestis and transsexuals" in the Barrio Orellana sector. The event was denounced by the foundation Famivida and the Ombudsman's Office due to the abuses in the operation against LGBTQ people.

These abuses led the city's LGBTQ community to organize and begin to act jointly to report cases of discrimination, which gradually helped to reduce them. They also began to organize events like the artistic festival "Arte y Diversidad", which Famivida developed from 2006 in honor of International LGBT Pride Day and in which recognitions were given to public figures from the local LGBTQ community. The 2008 edition of the festival was the first to hold a parade, which traveled along Avenida Delta and became the first Guayaquil Pride March. From 2008, the first commercial businesses (other than bars or nightclubs) aimed at the city's LGBTQ public also began to appear, while in 2007 the last known arrest of travestis occurred.

In early 2009, another case of municipal discrimination occurred when the director of justice and surveillance of the council closed without explanation eight LGBTQ bars and nightclubs in the city, including Vulcano, Plain Bar, and Artemisa, even though seven of them had the necessary permits for operation. According to a statement later issued by the municipality, authorities claimed the closure was due to the presentation of shows that "offended morality" involving supposed dances by naked people, which was denied by the closed bars. The nightclub owners held a sit-in days later as a form of protest and pointed out the irony that their venues had been closed for supposedly presenting dances by naked men when there were countless nightclubs in the city with dances by naked women operating without issue. The council agreed to reopen the venues after payment of a fine.

In June 2009, Guayaquil Pride was held for the first time in the city center and had the support of the national government. The march traveled along Malecón and Olmedo avenues and was attended by assemblywoman Amanda Arboleda and city council members Gina Godoy and Octavio Villacreces. When the march approached the Guayaquil Municipality sector, it encountered a cordon of municipal police blocking the way. However, the intervention of the authorities present resolved the impasse and allowed the march to continue without problems.

=== Since 2010 ===
The 2010s began with the removal of one of the last vestiges of municipal discrimination against LGBTQ people, as thanks to constant complaints and sit-ins by LGBTQ activists in the city, the municipality removed in December 2010 the signs stating that the council reserved the right of admission at tourist sites like Malecón 2000 that had been used to expel LGBTQ people. However, other forms of discrimination continued, particularly regarding the recognition of same-sex couples.

Even though the 2008 Constitution of Ecuador had legalized de facto unions for same-sex couples, until May 2012, only 7 of the 30 notary offices in the city allowed registrations. After a series of homophobic speeches in churches following a report highlighting this issue, a group of about 30 lesbian women held a protest sit-in at Plaza Rocafuerte. However, they were dispersed and beaten by metropolitan police, so the event was reported to the Ombudsman's Office. Thanks to recordings from security cameras around the square, the complainants demonstrated the abuses, so the municipality accepted that the metropolitan police receive sensitivity training on treating LGBTQ people, which marked the beginning of a change in the attitude of local authorities towards sexual diversity.

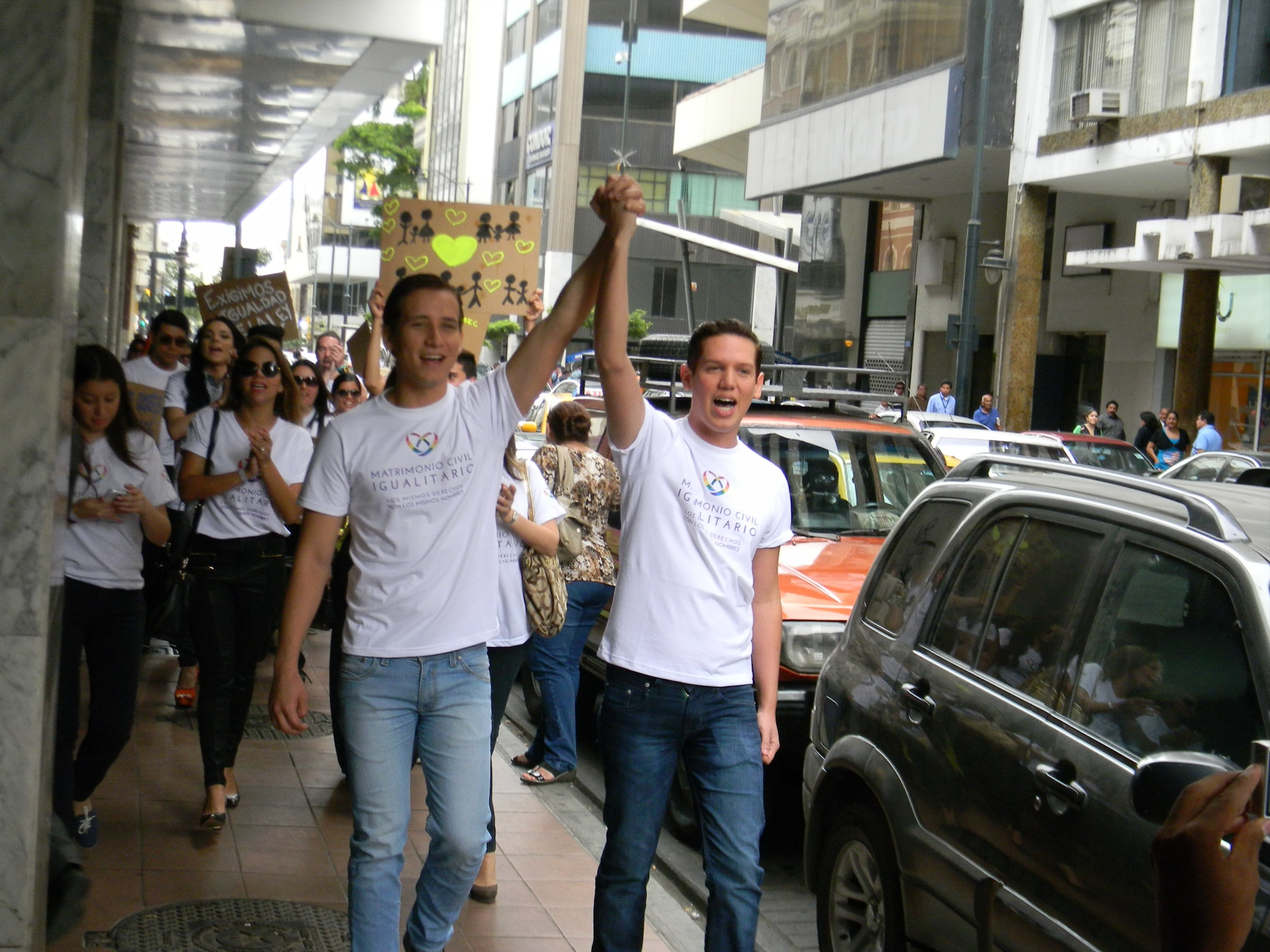
March in favor of same-sex marriage in 2013 in downtown Guayaquil.

On November 26, 2013, a male couple appeared at the Guayaquil Civil Registry intending to marry, as part of the start of the campaign to legalize same-sex marriage in Ecuador. The couple walked through the city streets along with a caravan of activists and supporters, notably including activist Silvia Buendía and actresses Erika Vélez and Doménica Menessini. However, three days later their request was denied on the grounds that, as a same-sex couple, they did not meet the requirements to marry based on Article 67 of the Constitution and Article 81 of the Civil Code.

In 2015, a group of LGBTQ and human rights organizations approached the Guayaquil Municipality to explore the possibility of approving a municipal ordinance in defense of people belonging to sexual diversity. These discussions lasted two years and led to the approval of the Ordinance for Gender Equality, Prevention of Discrimination, and Eradication of all forms of Gender-Based Violence, which took place on August 29, 2017. Among the points addressed by the ordinance are the development of training programs for citizens and public servants on gender issues, as well as the implementation of reparation policies for violated persons and guaranteeing access to public space for all, thus protecting LGBTQ populations from the exact type of discrimination they suffered years earlier at the hands of local government.

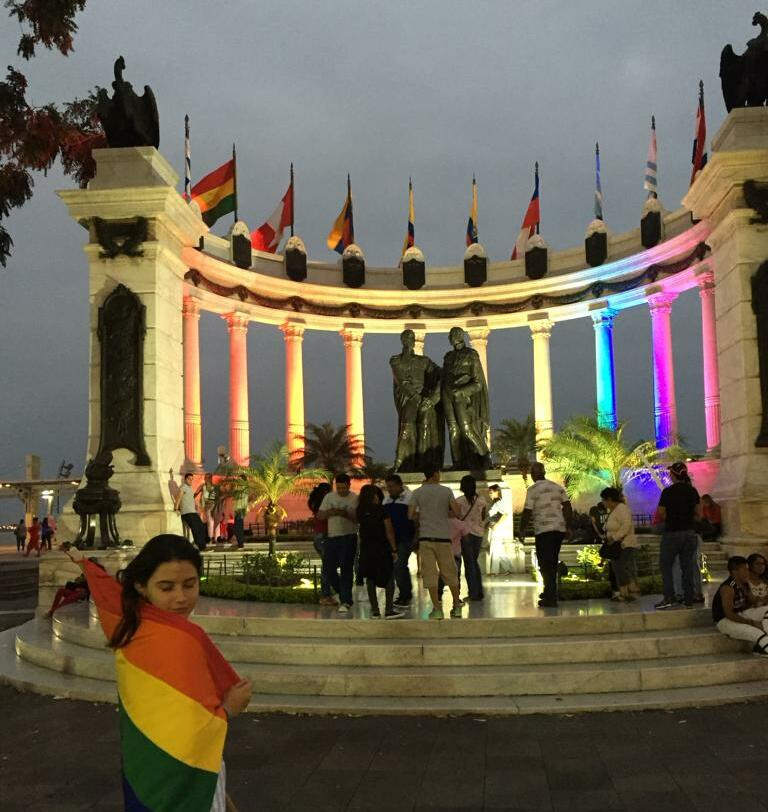
Hemiciclo de la Rotonda illuminated with the colors of the rainbow flag.

The city's municipal openness towards sexual diversity continued in subsequent years. On July 1, 2017, the municipality illuminated three iconic places in Guayaquil with the colors of the rainbow flag: the Hemiciclo de la Rotonda, the Torre The Point, and the La Perla ferris wheel, in commemoration of International LGBT Pride Day. Days later, Mayor Jaime Nebot stated that Guayaquil was a city of respect and that illuminating the tourist sites with the colors of the rainbow flag was a reflection of that position.

On June 12, 2019, the Constitutional Court issued a ruling legalizing same-sex marriage in Ecuador. After the decision came into effect, Guayaquil became the setting for the first same-sex marriage in the country. The event took place on July 18, 2019, between the female couple formed by Michelle Avilés and Alexandra Chávez, who married at the Civil Registry offices in the city, at the intersection of 9 de Octubre and Pedro Carbo avenues. The first marriage between two men also occurred in the city. It took place on July 25, 2019, with Giovanny Vareles and Borys Álvarez as the contracting parties.

== Leisure and culture ==
LGBTQ entertainment establishments originated in Guayaquil in the late 1970s, when the first clandestine LGBTQ bars appeared. Of particular importance was the LGBTQ nightclub Vulcano, which opened in 2002 and became the most popular entertainment venue among the city's sexually diverse populations. The nightclub, located between Rocafuerte and Padre Aguirre streets, was a pioneer in presenting drag shows in Guayaquil.

After the closure of Vulcano, its place was taken by nightclubs like Atenea. Other LGBTQ clubs and bars of the first decades of the 21st century included the establishments Artemisa, Plain Bar, Retro, and Ibiza. In recent years, nightclubs like Monalisa have gained prominence, as well as the LGBTQ parties of La Vista, which featured international artists and were held at places like Malecón del Salado or the Convention Center.

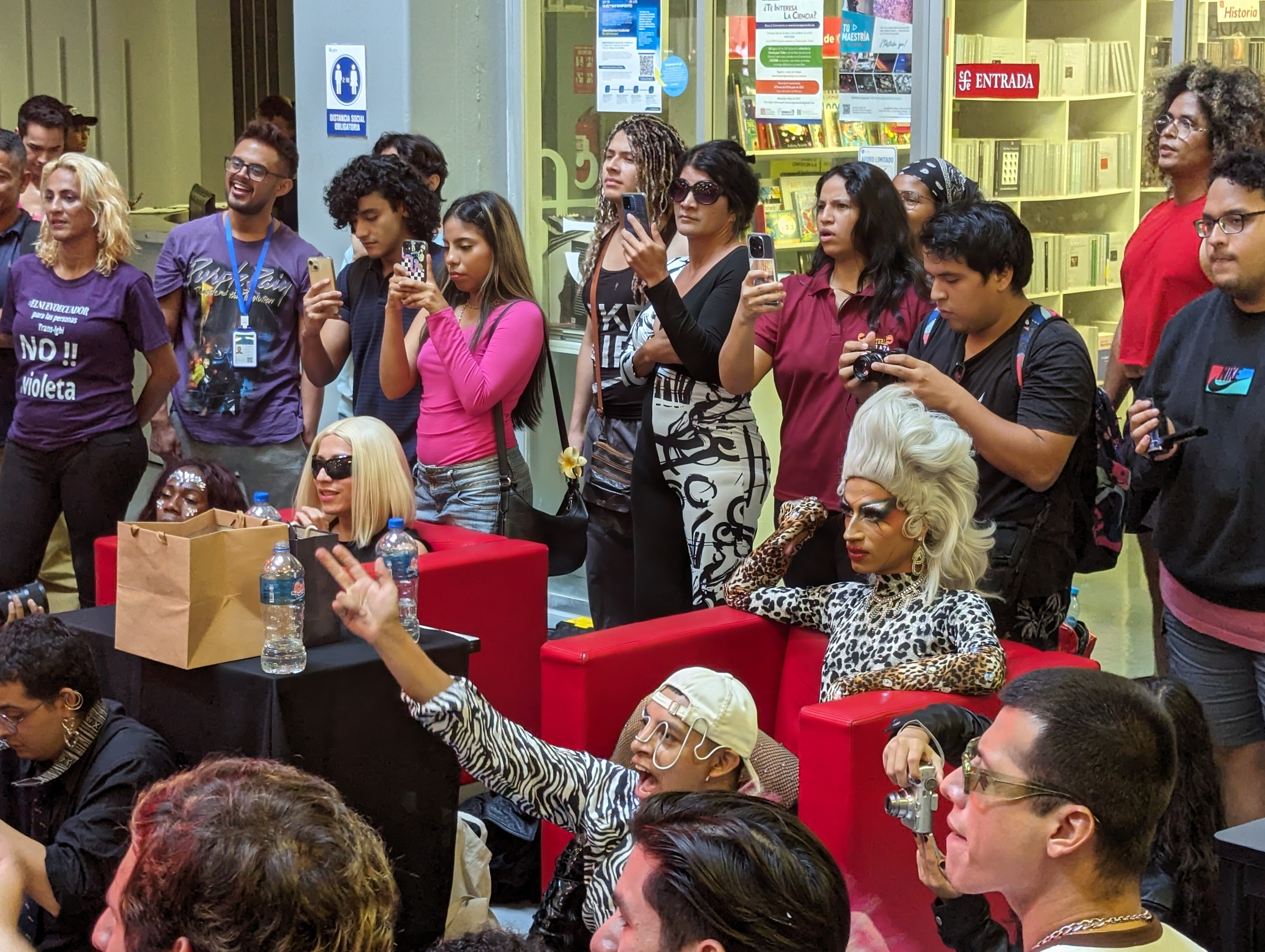
Drag and vogue event held in Guayaquil in 2024.

Guayaquil drag culture includes contemporary exponents like Nebraska Ruilova. Additionally, there is a drag artistic collective called Haus of Locas, which holds regular performances at various establishments in the city.

On the theater side, LGBT-themed plays have been performed in the city in recent years at cultural institutions like the Teatro Centro de Arte, where the English play Cock was staged. Estudio Paulsen, inaugurated in 2017, has presented several theatrical works with LGBTQ-related plots, including El ornitorrinco, Nuestra boda: las obras del matrimonio gay, and Del amor y otros traumas. Guayaquil-born non-binary actor Adrián Avilés, for his part, has written and staged works like Tu madre, in which he performed in 2022 alongside actress Ruth Coello. He also created and performed in the stand-up show Inventada, a performance in honor of International LGBT Pride Day.

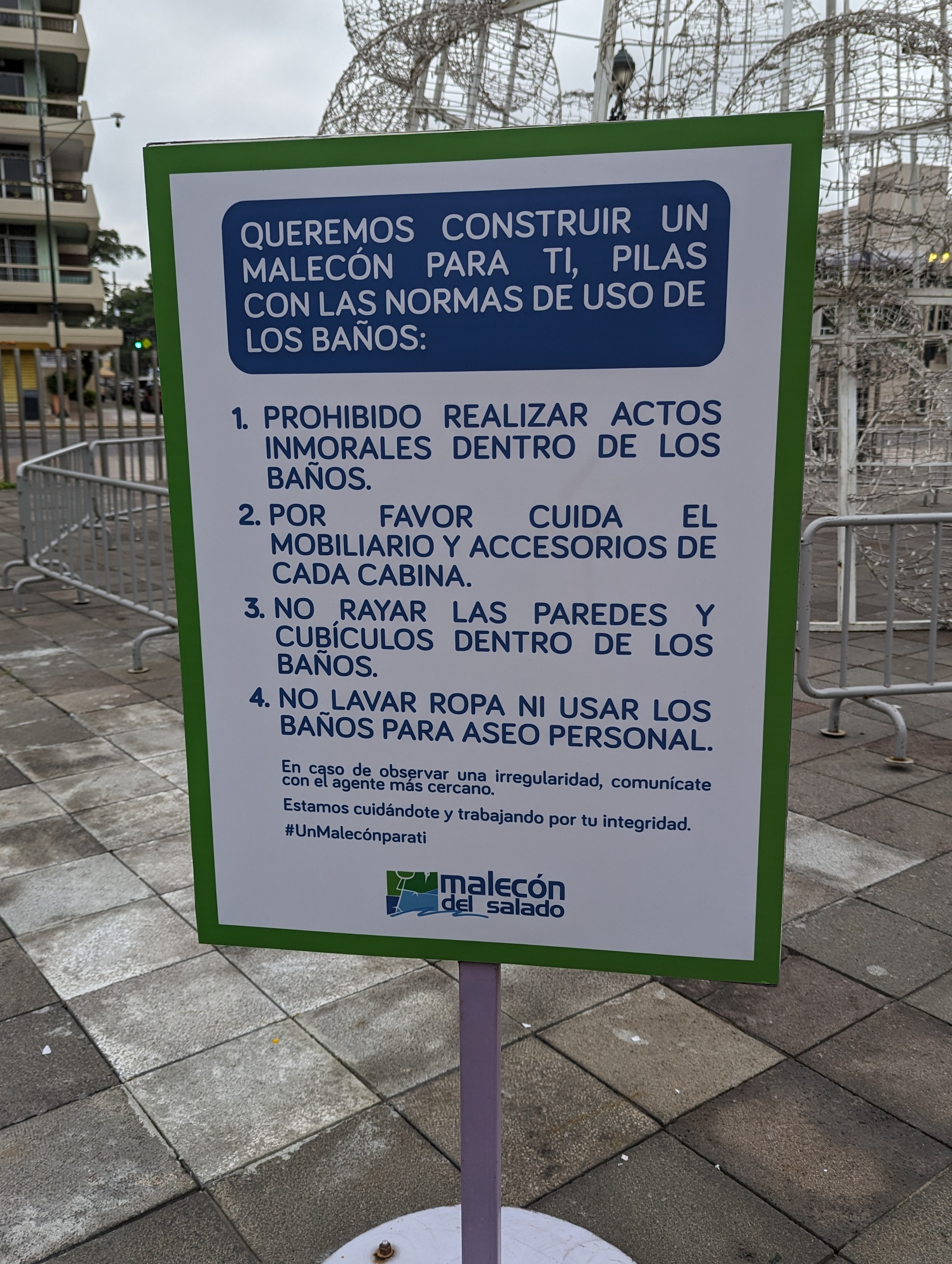
Sign at Malecón del Salado including a reference to cruising.

=== Cruising ===
Although the advent of online dating apps has facilitated the search for LGBTQ people to establish romantic or sexual relationships, Guayaquil still has places where some homosexual men often have anonymous sexual encounters in public spaces, a practice known as cruising. The most frequented places for this are Parque Samanes and the bathrooms of sites like Malecón 2000, the Malecón del Salado, and shopping malls. People who engage in this practice often share meeting spots on social media hoping for interested parties.

Cruising is not a criminalized activity in Guayaquil. However, the practice has generated complaints from passersby who notice the encounters. In 1992, the city municipality approved an ordinance on the use of public space and roads that prohibited the "satisfaction of bodily needs" in public places. However, it was declared unconstitutional in 1996.

== Events ==
=== Guayaquil Pride ===
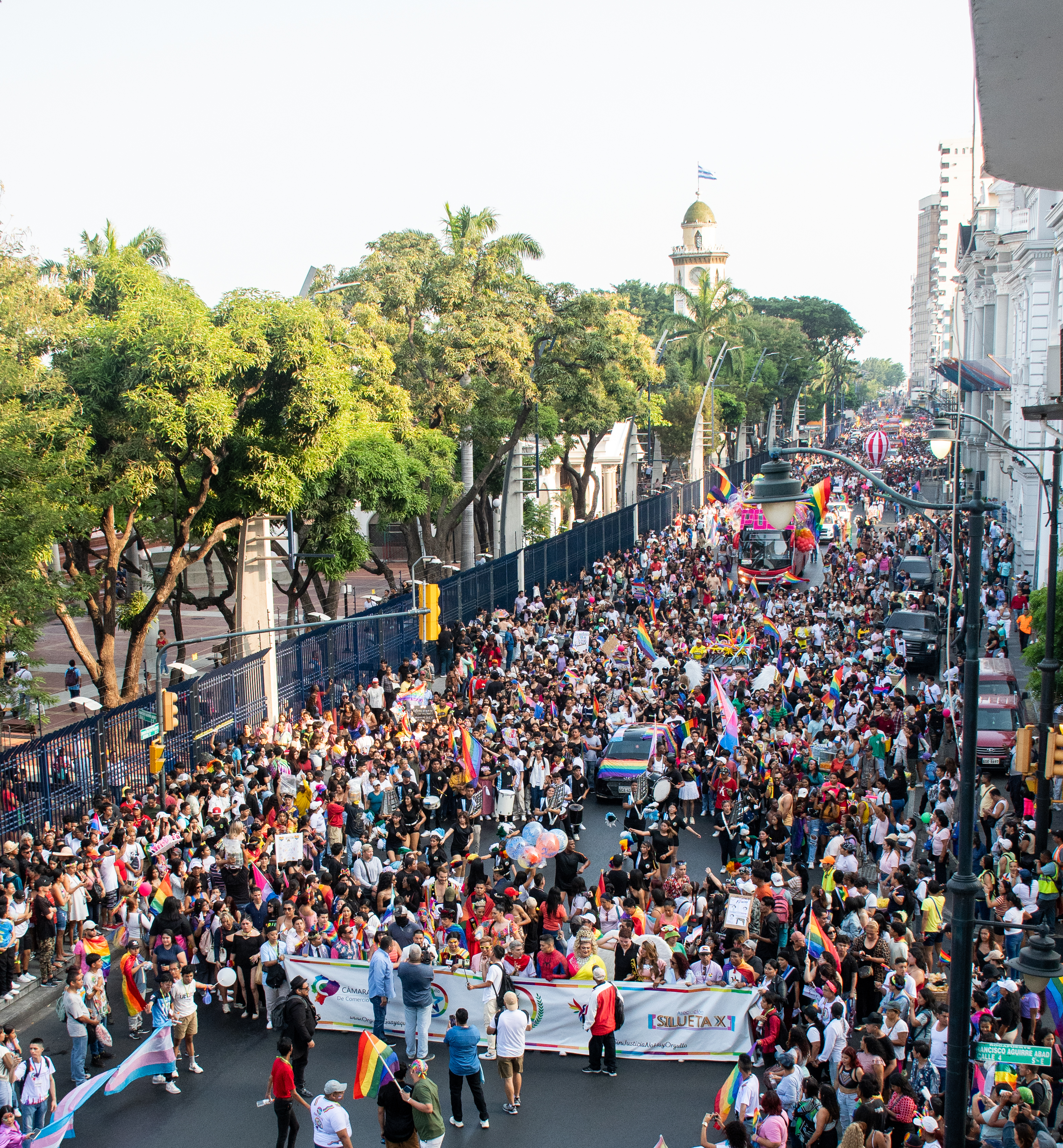
2024 edition of Guayaquil Pride.

Guayaquil Pride is a demonstration held annually as part of International LGBT Pride Day to commemorate the struggle for the rights of people belonging to sexual diversity. The march starts at Avenida Olmedo and ends at Parque Centenario, along a route approximately two and a half kilometers long.

During the march, floats participate, and musical shows and dances take place. Attendance at the event has grown steadily and today it is one of the most crowded annual parades in the city, with the 2023 edition reaching nearly 40,000 people. Among the public figures who have attended are authorities such as the provincial prefect, assembly members, and city council members.

The history of the march dates back to the "Arte y Diversidad" festival, organized by the foundation Famivida in the Kennedy citadel from 2006 to 2008. This last edition included a parade that traveled along Avenida Delta and became the first pride march in the city's history. The 2009 edition was the first to take place in the city center and had the support of the national government. Since 2014, the Guayaquil municipality began granting permits to hold the march, given that in previous editions only authorization from the Police Intendancy had been received.

Currently, the march is organized by a committee made up of groups in favor of LGBTQ rights, including Asociación Silueta X, Asociación Transmasculinos del Ecuador, Colectivo GLBTI Milagro, Colectivo GLBTI Nobol, and Colectiva Transfeminista.

The 2023 edition faced complications when the city's mayor, Aquiles Álvarez, denied permits for the march to take place in the city center, arguing that the event would generate traffic and suggested it move to Parque Samanes. LGBTQ organizations rejected this suggestion, stating it was an attempt to displace LGBTQ people by sending them to a sector outside the city, without guarantees of safety or lighting. Faced with the mayor's refusal to reconsider the decision, legal protection actions were filed against him, which were resolved in favor of the march organizers, so it proceeded without incident along the usual route.

=== Other events ===
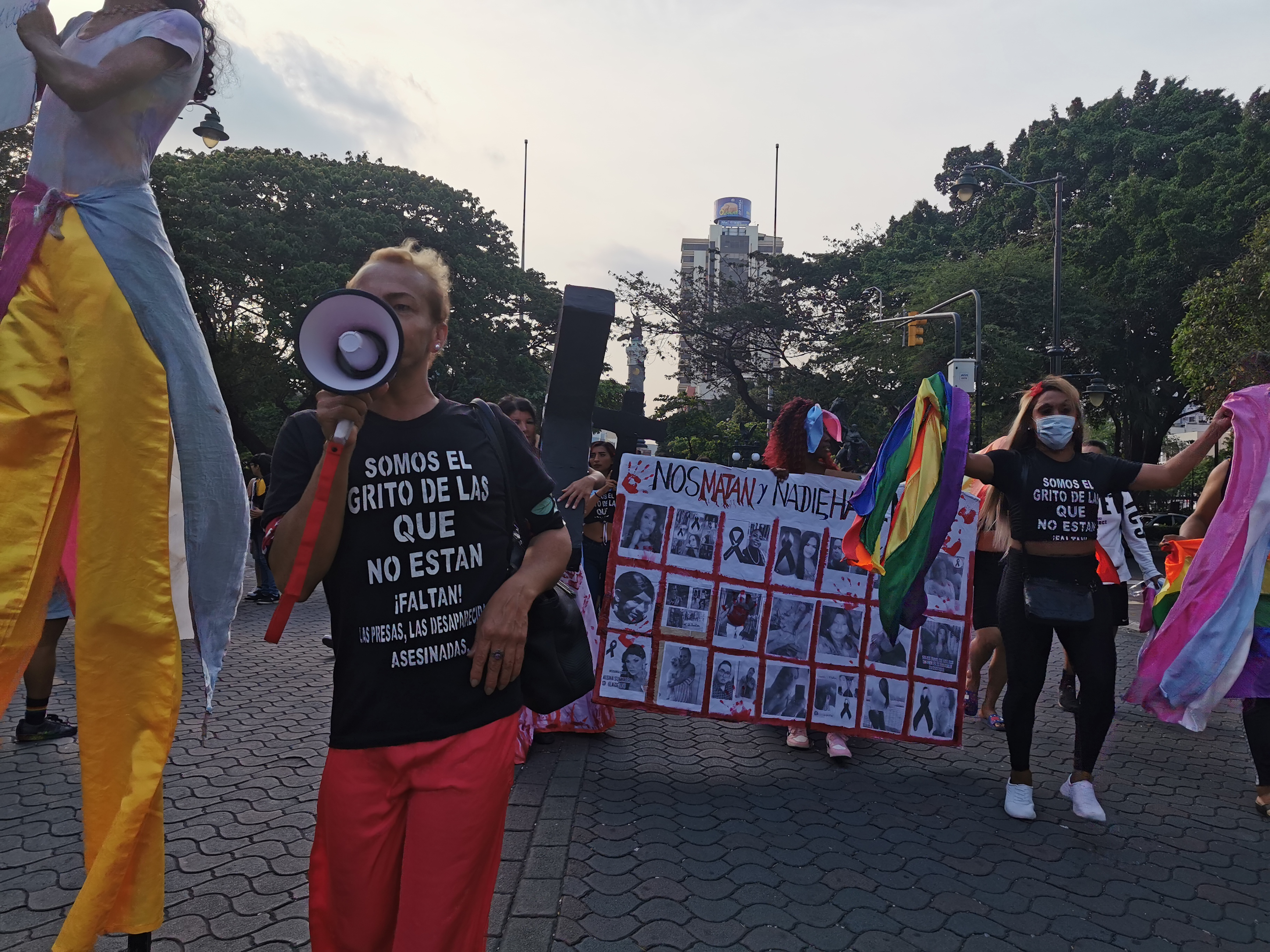
2023 edition of the National Trans March in Guayaquil.

Viudas de año viejo (English: Old year widows) is a tradition during the fin de año (New Year's Eve) celebrations. During this men cross dress as women and go out in the streets crying about the death of the old year and ask for alms to pay for the wake of the deceased, represented by a monigote (rag doll).

Since 2021, an edition of the National Trans March of Ecuador, also known as the Trans Pride March, has been held annually in Guayaquil to commemorate the International Transgender Day of Remembrance and the decriminalization of homosexuality in the country, remembered on November 25. The National Trans March began in Quito in 2020. That year, a demonstration was held in Guayaquil at Parque Centenario. From the following year, each November a march has taken place as part of this commemoration in the city.

Guayaquil is also one of the annual host cities for the El Lugar Sin Límites International LGBT Film Festival, which was created with the aim of generating new spaces for Ecuadorian LGBTQ populations different from nightclubs or similar venues. Among the venues that have hosted the festival are the cinema at the Museo Antropológico y de Arte Contemporáneo (Anthropological and Contemporary Art Museum) and the Guayas branch of the Casa de la Cultura Ecuatoriana (Ecuadorian House of Culture).

== LGBTQ institutions and organizations ==
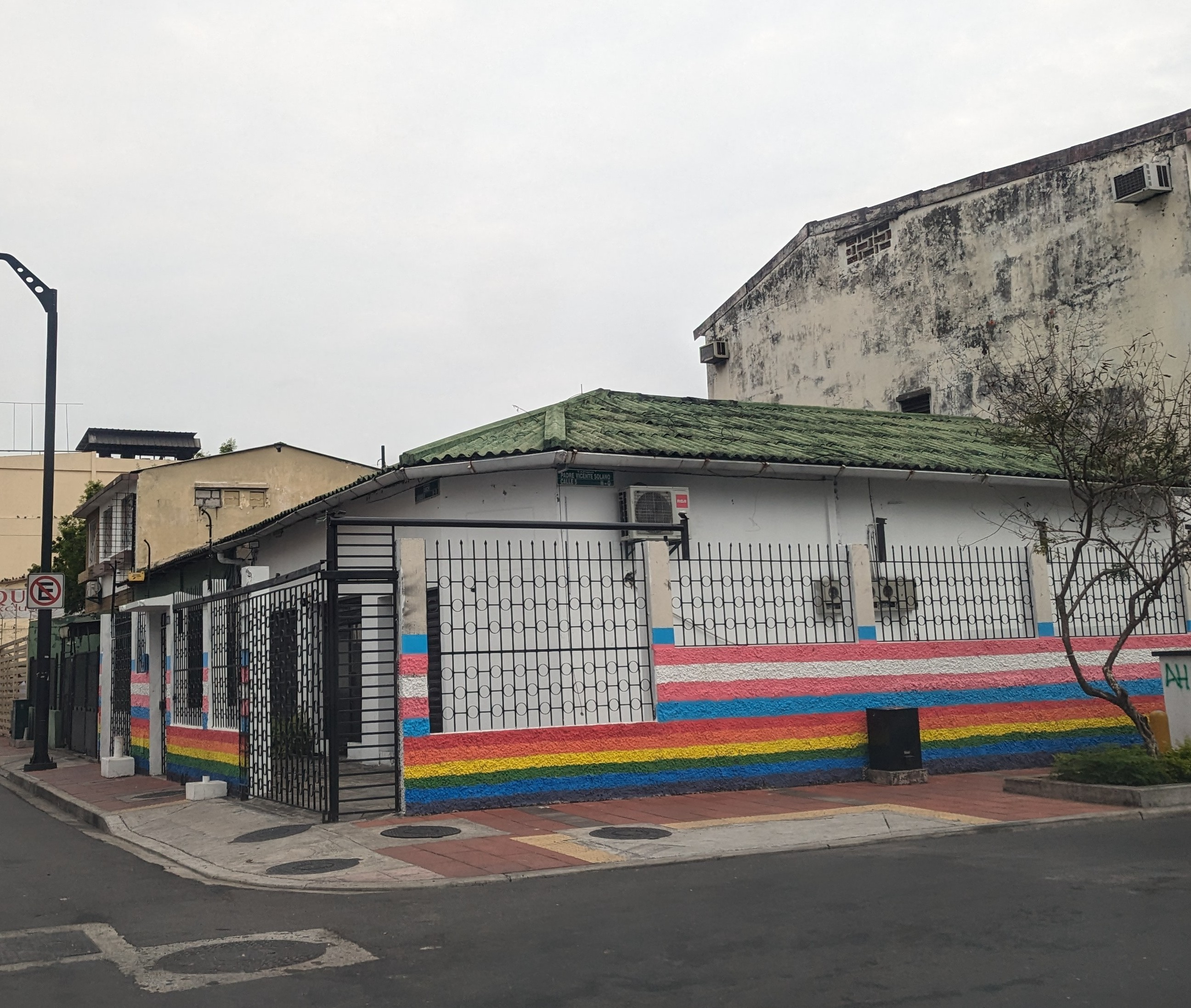
Headquarters of Asociación Silueta X, in downtown Guayaquil.

There are numerous organizations focused on LGBTQ populations in Guayaquil. Among them, mention can be made of Asociación Silueta X, whose headquarters are in the city center and which is one of the organizing groups for Guayaquil Pride. The association carries out programs such as a hormone bank for transgender people and conducts political activism campaigns to promote legal changes in favor of sexually diverse populations.

Since 2017, a group of LGBTQ organizations in the city jointly administers a space called Casa de la Diversidad, located between Esmeraldas and Nueve de Octubre avenues, which functions as a space for strategic discussion and for teaching workshops on gender and sexual diversity, in addition to having a bar and a library of LGBT-themed books. The organizations that joined the project were Alianza Igualitaria, Mujer & Mujer, Caballeros Transmasculinos, and Diverso Ecuador.

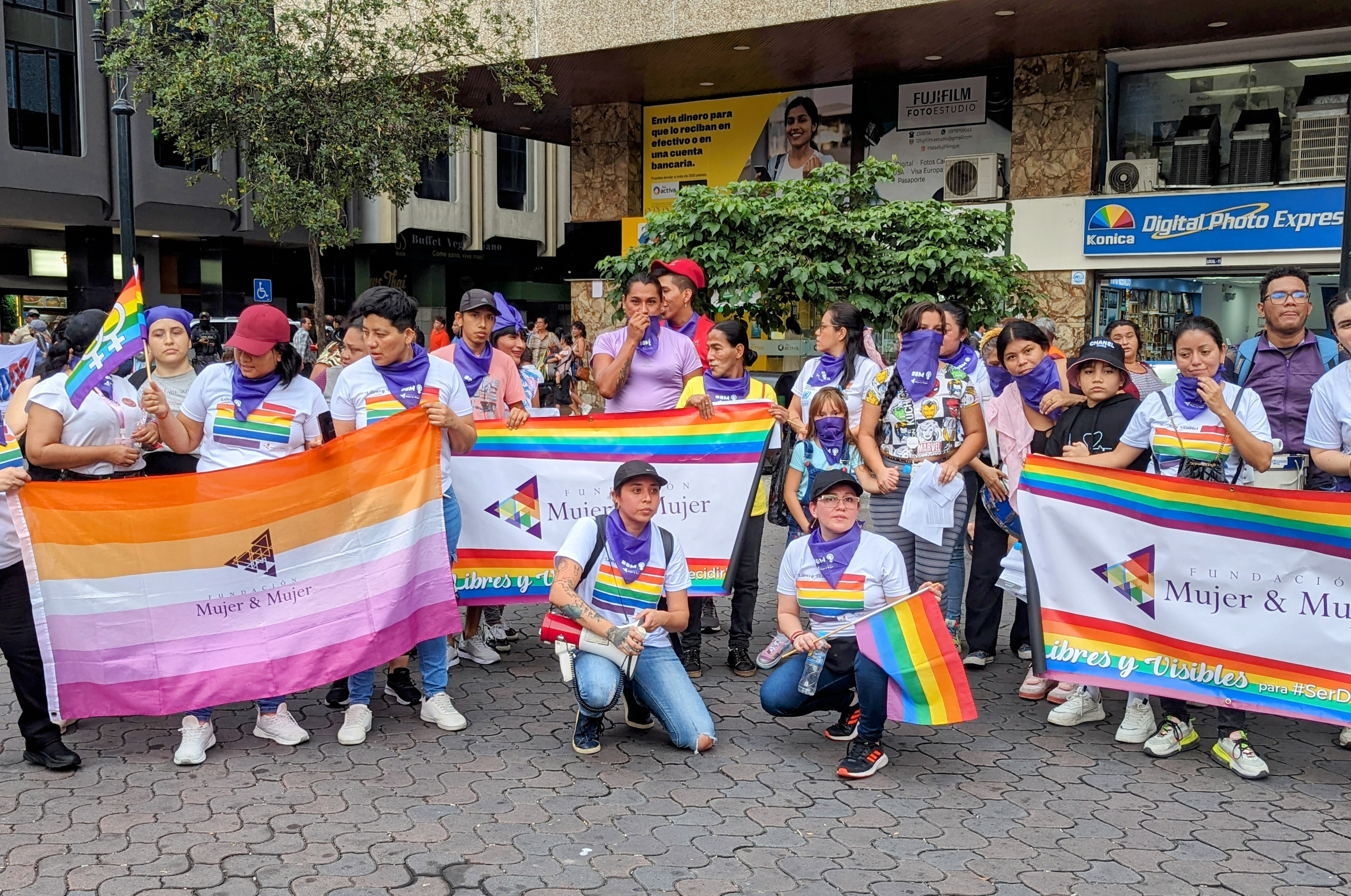
Mujer & Mujer activists during a march in Guayaquil in 2024.

There are also shelter spaces, focused mainly on the transgender population. Casa de las Muñecas opened its doors in September 2017 and has since become a refuge space for homeless transgender women, offering them beauty courses and training on effective access to rights, sexual education, and health. Another similar space is the Dejando Huellas shelter, located in the populous sector of Flor de Bastión, also focused on helping transgender women.

In 2021, the LGBTQ and feminist cultural center Guayaqueer opened its doors in the city center. It was conceived as a space for historical recovery, debate, and artistic promotion for proposals, projects, and initiatives from local sexually diverse populations.

== Social acceptance ==
Acceptance of LGBTQ people by the rest of the population of Guayaquil has increased considerably in recent decades. However, there are still cases of discrimination against same-sex couples for showing affection in public spaces, mostly attributed to people's ignorance of the legal protections that today protect people belonging to sexual diversity, such as the Ordinance for Gender Equality, Prevention of Discrimination, and Eradication of all forms of Gender-Based Violence, approved in 2017. In a report by the newspaper Expreso in 2022, LGBTIQ+ people in the city stated they are still subjected to stares and mockery when visibly attending public places with their partners, so many prefer to limit displays of affection.

In March 2021, a female couple was admonished by a security guard in the Los Ceibos park who stated that kisses between same-sex couples were "inappropriate". After holding a sit-in at the location and filing a complaint with the president of the Los Ceibos committee, he stated that a campaign would be carried out among the area's guards to prevent them from issuing discriminatory comments again. A similar act of discrimination occurred in May 2022, when a guard at a bar in the Samborondón sector ejected a male couple, stating that same-sex couples were not allowed to dance. After the Secretariat of Human Rights spoke out against the guard's actions, the bar issued a statement saying they would investigate the facts and take "the necessary corrective measures".

In 2022, the international consultancy Ipsos conducted a survey on the acceptance of sexual diversity in Ecuador. The results showed that a plurality of people in Guayaquil neither showed support nor rejection of lesbian, gay, bisexual, transgender, and intersex (LGBTI) people. The first question asked about support for LGBTI people being "open about their sexual orientation or gender identity" and 38.3% of respondents in the city stated they strongly supported it. Regarding openness to LGBTI couples being able to show affection in public, 28.9% of the population strongly supports it, 42.3% neither support nor oppose, and 29.3% stated they strongly oppose it. Regarding the existence of laws to prohibit discrimination against LGBTI people, only 14.2% of Guayaquil residents said they strongly opposed them. The results in Guayaquil were generally lower in terms of support for LGBTI people compared to Quito. Furthermore, the results showed a large difference in acceptance between generations, with support for the LGBTI population being much higher in Generation Z and lower in Generation X and Baby boomers.

== See also ==
- LGBTQ rights in Ecuador
- Sexual diversity in Huancavilca culture
- Pride celebrations in Ecuador
- Guayaquil Pride
- Quito Pride

== Bibliography ==
- Buendía, Silvia (2019). "Desde la vergüenza hacia el orgullo. El trayecto que nos permitió dejar de ser delincuentes y empezar a ser ciudadanos" [From shame to pride. The journey that allowed us to stop being delinquents and start being citizens] (PDF). Violencia, géneros y derechos en el territorio [Violence, genders, and rights in the territory] (1st ed.). Quito: Abya-Yala. ISBN 978-9942-09-633-3. OCLC 1110088345.
- García, Ruth (2014). Análisis de la situación actual de la oferta turística para la comunidad GLBTI en la ciudad de Guayaquil, y las expectativas de crecimiento e inclusión del turismo gay en la sociedad [Analysis of the current situation of the tourist offer for the GLBTI community in the city of Guayaquil, and the expectations of growth and inclusion of gay tourism in society] (PDF) (Bachelor's thesis). Universidad Católica de Santiago de Guayaquil. Archived from the original (PDF) on 2023-12-12.
- Garita Sánchez, Ana (2021). Hacerse voz: hacia una comprensión del sujeto, la subjetividad y la identidad política lésbica de Quito y Guayaquil a través del espacio biográfico [Becoming voice: towards an understanding of the lesbian subject, subjectivity, and political identity of Quito and Guayaquil through biographical space] (PDF) (Master's thesis). Quito: Facultad Latinoamericana de Ciencias Sociales. pp. 66–80. Archived from the original (PDF) on 2022-07-03.
- Lobato, Fredy, ed. (2023). Cuéntame una historia. Despenalización de la homosexualidad en Ecuador [Tell me a story. Decriminalization of homosexuality in Ecuador]. Fundación Equidad. ISBN 978-9942-7154-0-1.
- Ramos Ballesteros, Paulino (2019). Archivo, imágenes y cuerpo en el vigésimo aniversario de la despenalización de la homosexualidad en Ecuador [Archive, images and body on the twentieth anniversary of the decriminalization of homosexuality in Ecuador] (PDF) (Master's thesis). Quito: FLACSO. Archived from the original (PDF) on 2021-04-27.
