= Carlos Altamirano Sánchez =

Ecuadorian poet

Carlos Altamirano Sánchez (born November 15, 1926) is a poet from Guayaquil, Ecuador.

== Biography ==
Carlos Altamirano Sánchez was born in Guayaquil on November 15, 1926. His father was Santiago Altamirano Freile, from Tungurahua, and his mother was Delia Sánchez Rodríguez, from Pelileo.

In 1954 his former professor Alfonso Aguilar Ruilova got him a job as a journalist at El Universo, which he quit soon after to take part in the World Youth Congress in Poland, which he ultimately did not attend. In 1955 Sergio Román Armendáriz published an anthology of poetry titled 33 Poemas Universitarios, which included 3 of Altamirano Sánchez' poems: "6 a.m.", "Sueño Profético" and "Equivocación de Dios". In 1959 he taught literature at the Colegio Nacional Juan Bautista Aguirre. He returned to work for El Universo in 1957 and 1959. In 1963 he joined the committee of the publishing house or El Universo, and also elected him its secretary. By 1964 he stopped working for the newspaper and sold raffle tickets on the street to make a living. In 1965 his friend Galo Martínez Merchán got him a job at the newspaper El Tiempo, but it had only 3 issues before being canceled, so he went to work as a reporter for the evening newspaper La Razón. In 1966 he was elected a member of the Mass Communication Media Section of the Guayaquil branch of the House of Ecuadorian Culture. In 1967 he founded the Union of Ecuadorian Journalists, an entity that lasted til 1970.

In 1967 he moved to Chicago hoping to live out a dream, but he soon realized the hard reality for Latinos living in the U.S. There he worked as a dish water at the Club of Chicago University. He wrote a novel titled Puercos y Ratas (Pigs and Rats) about how miserable life for Latinos is in the U.S. The novel has yet to be published.

He returned to Guayaquil in 1968 and went to work as a reporter for La Razón. In 1971 he traveled to Panama with other Ecuadorian journalists to cover the return from exile of the populist leader Asaad Bucaram. In 1978 he went to work for the Ecuadorian Press Association of Pedro Iglesias Caamaño, where he remained until 1985 when the agency was closed due to the death of its director.

In 1991, after 40 years of not publishing poetry, he published the book "Lamento de un Soñador".

For some years Altamirano Sánchez has gone completely blind.

== Personal life ==
He was married to Jeaneth Noboa Hidalgo, and had 4 children.

== Works ==
- "Hijo Imperfecto" (1946)
- "Paralelo 38" (1950) - Gold Medal winner of the Borja Lavayen Poetry Contest
- "Danza de una queja" (1963)
- "Exhumación" (1977) co-written with Ricardo Vasconcelos
- "Lamento de un Soñador" (1991)
