= Murder of Javier Viteri =

2020 hate crime in Ecuador

- Date: 27 May 2020
- Location: Arenillas Canton, Ecuador
- Type: Homicide
- Cause: Murder

Javier Viteri was found murdered on 27 May 2020 in Arenillas Canton. He had been stabbed multiple times. It was ruled as a homophobic attack, which was committed by Hilmar Corozo, who was later convicted and sentenced to 34 years in prison of the crime. The event received extensive media coverage due to the nature of the crime.

== Background ==
Javier Slater Viteri Albuquerque (born: 28 July 1997) was a 22-year old from Machala, who worked as a dental assistant in his cousin's practice. He had earlier started studying for his medical degree in Cuenca, but had to discontinue due to personal issues. His family abused him and admitted him to a dehomosexualization clinic after learning of his sexual orientation. He had moved to Arenillas in 2019, after he was kicked out of his house.

Hilmer Corozo was a 19-year-old military conscript, who was engaged in conversation with Viteri through social media at least since a day before the incident.

== Incident ==
At around 10 p.m. on 27 May 2020, Viteri had a sexual encounter with Corozo, to whom he had shared the address of his home through a message. When Corozo arrived at Viteri's home, Viteri was playing video games with three of his friends, whom Viteri asked to leave soon after. Viteri's friends waited for him near the house. After nearly forty minutes, Corozo ran away from the place with a backpack that belonged to one of Viteri's friends. While they chased Corozo, they lost track of him near the military barracks, to which Corozo had belonged to.

Upon returning to Viteri's apartment, they knocked on the door and got no response. When they forced open the door, they found the body of Viteri along with three blood-stained sharp weapons and used condoms nearby.

== Aftermath ==
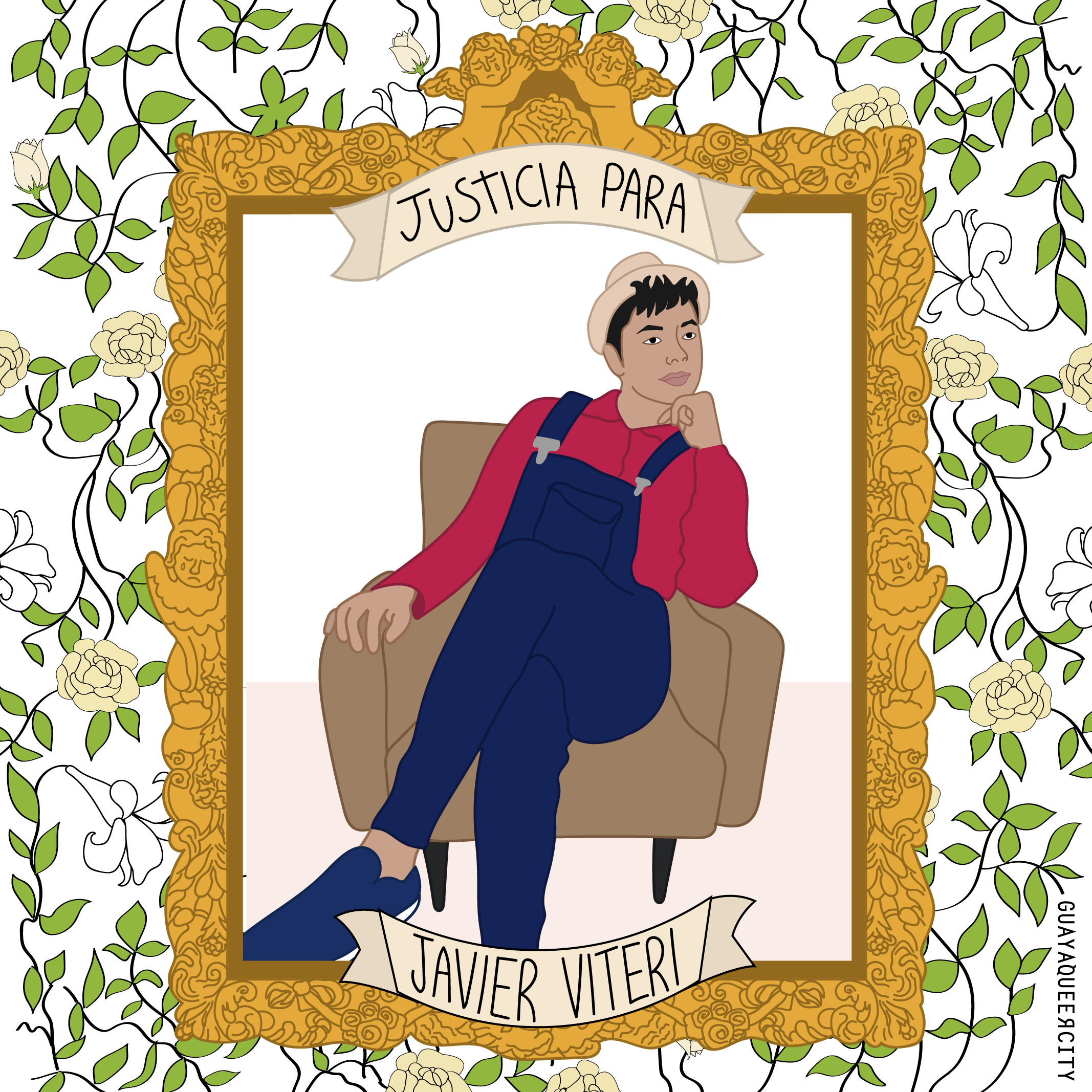
Illustration by Guayaqueer about the murder of Javier Viteri

The autopsy revealed that Viteri had received between 80 and 90 stab wounds to the back, abdomen, chest, and neck. The incident was suspected as a homophobic attack. Since Viteri had opened his Facebook account from his cousin's cell phone, the police were able to review the conversations he had had and were thus able to discover Corozo's identity.

Corozo, who had taken refuge in the military barracks, was arrested the next day. He was later identified as the killer by Viteri's three friends. Viteri's cell phone, which was found in Corozo's possession, was later confirmed to have traces of Viteri's blood.

The incident received extensive media coverage due to the brutality of the attack on Viteri, who was stabbed 89 before he died. After learning of the murder, LGBTQ organizations and groups such as Guayaqueer and Silueta X began to raise awareness on the case in social networks.

== Trial and sentencing ==
After Corozo's arrest, the prosecutor's office initially began the investigation of the crime as a murder for theft. However, this was criticized by LGBTQ activists, who called for the crime to be recognized as a hate crime. They claimed that the backpack theft was a distraction and that the fact that Corozo had stabbed Viteri multiple times proved that he was motivated by hatred. The National Council for Gender Equality also opposed the prosecution's decision and asserted that the characteristics of the victim's murder raises the question that the possible motivation could be hatred.

During a psychological test conducted by the prosecutor's office, Corozo admitted to being the perpetrator of the crime and claimed to have murdered Viteri after feeling "bullied" by him. Judge Guido Vaca presided over the trial against Corozo, who was tried for murder, and the trial began on 31 July 2020. The sentence was initially expected to be pronounced on 16 June 2021, but was postponed after Corozo's defense attorney stated that he had contracted COVID-19. The final hearing against Corozo was held in the Provincial Court of Machala on 7 July 2021. Relatives and friends of Viteri held a demonstration outside the Court demanding justice for his death. Later, Corozo was sentenced to 34 years and eight months in prison for the murder.

== See also ==
- Murder of Itaberli Lozano
- Murder of Wendy Calle
