= Ruilova =

Ruilova is a surname. Notable people with the surname include:

- Aïda Ruilova (born 1974), American artist
- Alfonso Aguilar Ruilova (1914–1989), Ecuadorian educator
