= Ismael Pérez =

Ismael Pérez may refer to:

- Ismael Pérez Montt (1847–1905), Chilean lawyer and politician, minister of justice in 1890–1891
- Ismael Pérez Pazmiño (1876–1944), Ecuadorian newspaperman and politician
- Ismael Pérez "Poncianito" (born 1941), actor of the Golden Age of Mexican Cinema, appeared in Tehuantepec (1954) et al.
