= Carlos Benavides Vega =

Ecuadorian poet and playwright

Carlos Benavides Vega (1931–1999) was an Ecuadorian poet and playwright. He also wrote under the pseudonym Álvaro San Félix. He was born in Guayaquil. In his youth, he was one of the members of the poetry group called “Club 7,” which also included David Ledesma Vásquez, Ileana Espinel, Miguel Donoso Pareja, Gastón Hidalgo, Charles Abadíe Silva and Sergio Román Armendáriz. He later dedicated himself to the theatre, and became a leading writer of historical drama. He also wrote scripts for radio plays. Among his noted works are:

- La herida de Dios (1978; winner of the Aurelio Espinosa Pólit Prize) about the historical figure of Gabriel García Moreno
- Espejo, alias Chushig (1979; Premio Sesquicentenario Universidad Central)
- Caudillos en llamas (1980), Premio Casa de la Cultura Ecuatoriana

With Pedro Saad Herrería he wrote Una loca estrella, a historical play about Manuelita Sáenz.

He died in 1999.
