= Viudas de año viejo =

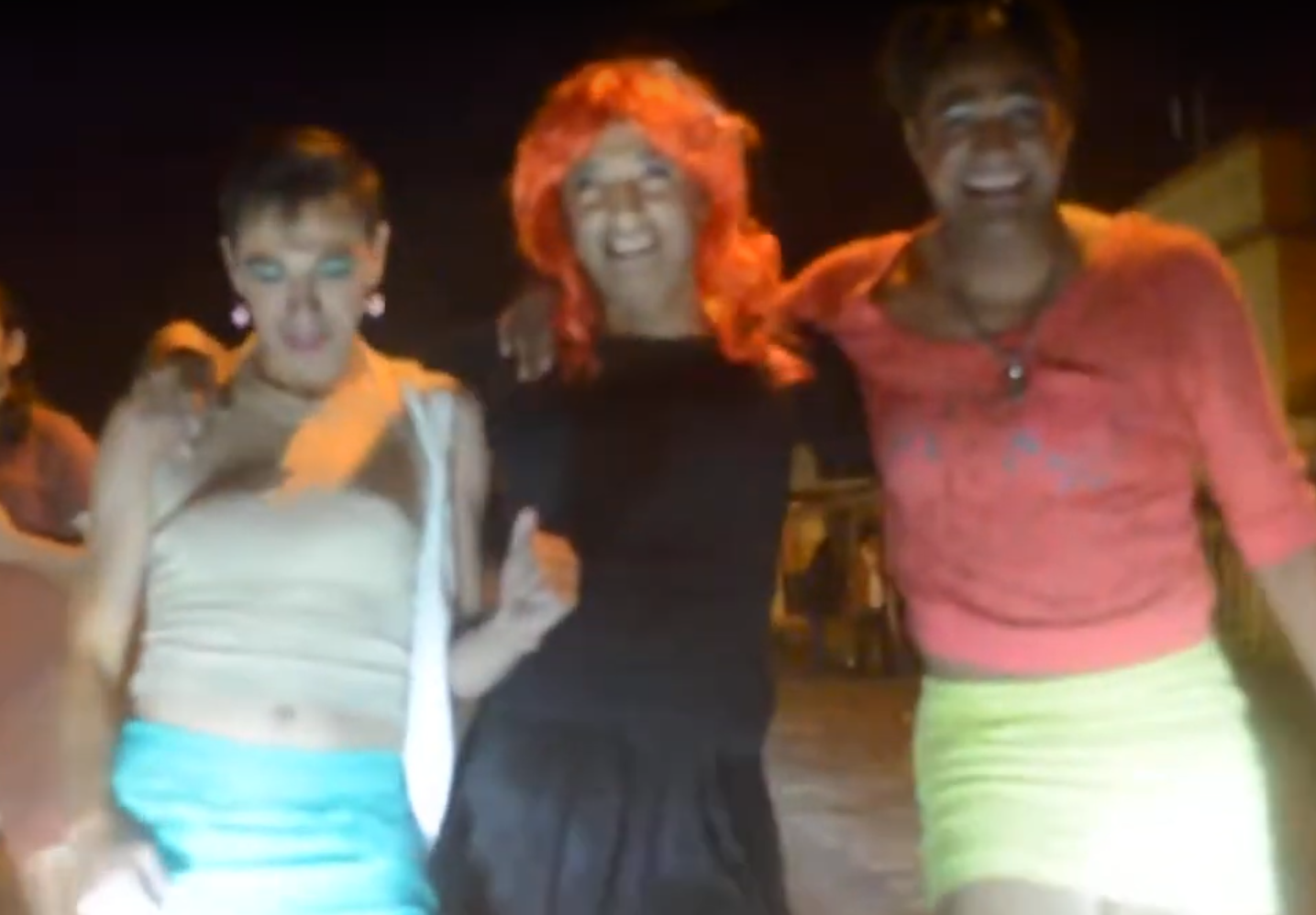
Viudas de año viejo in 2015 in Loja.

Viudas de año viejo (English: Old year widows) are traditional figures who participate in the fin de año (New Year's Eve) celebrations in Ecuador. These are usually men who cross dress as women and go out in the streets crying about the death of the old year and asking for alms to pay for the wake of the "deceased" year, represented by an año viejo (a kind of effigy).

The participants dress up in extravagant and traditionally black costumes, and flirt with passers-by and drivers in the streets with the intention of making them laugh and convince them to give them money. Sometimes, they are joined by people who dress up in other costumes such as devils, clowns and witches, who supposedly represent the relatives of the dead year.

The tradition is unique to Ecuador, and as per historian Enrique Ayala Mora, it is probably the only one of its kind where the New Year's Eve is celebrated in such a away wherein the widows mourn for the deceased. In 2024, the Mexican newspaper El Informador listed it in its list of the strangest end-of-year traditions in the world.

== History ==
The tradition of Viudas de año viejo ("Old year widows") has its origin in later part 19th century. Initially, it started in the form of funeral processions commemorating the year that ended, which was represented by a monigote (rag doll), and the mourning widows played the role of the alleged widows of the monigote. They asked for money with which they then prepared a meal for those were present at the procession. This tradition was recorded in 1897 by the Italian naturalist Enrico Festa (fr), who pointed out that during the celebration to mark the end of the year in Ecuador women go on a "grotesque funeral procession".

Over the years, the role of widows came to be played by men, and in addition, the tradition acquired a more satirical and parodic character. Photographic records from the 1950s show that the tradition had already taken their current form at that time, except for the clothing, which was more reserved and that they went out into the streets of cities such as Quito and Guayaquil to ask for money from the car drivers. Subsequently, the outfits changed over time, from a mourning dress and a veil to more extravagant suits, with a reason that these helped better to get money from the people to pay the supposed debts left by the dead.

In 1969, the Guayaquil based newspaper El Universo held a contest to choose the best widows, although it was conducted again in the subsequent years. According to historian Ángel Hidalgo, the intention of the contest was to try to professionalize the tradition and thus prevent thieves from disguising themselves as widows to commit crimes during the event.

In the 21st century, men cross dress using colorful wigs, exaggerated makeup, miniskirts, high heels, and use false eyelashes, and other feminine accessories. To attract the attention of the people, some of them perform dance and acrobatics. These widows often managed to generate between 50 and 200 dollars in alms as of 2015. Although tradition is celebrated throughout the country, it is more prevalent in the Sierra and Amazon regions compared to the Ecuadorian coast.
