= List of tallest buildings in Ecuador =

The following table shows the tallest buildings in Ecuador. As of September 2026, Torre Maxximus is currently the tallest building in Ecuador.

== Tallest buildings ==
Was the tallest building in Ecuador upon completion

Rank	Building	Photo	City	Height	Number of floors	Year
1	Torre Maxximus		Guayaquil	184 m (currently at 151.5 m)	51 (currently at 42 floors)	2027
2	Torre The Point		Guayaquil	136.5 m	36	2013
3	Banco La Previsora		Guayaquil	135 m	33	1995
4	Edificio IQON		Quito	131 m	33	2023
5	Grand Diamond Beach		Tonsupa (Atacames)	126 m	32	2017
6	Basilica del Sagrado Voto Nacional		Quito	117 m	38	1928
7	El Forum		Guayaquil	105 m	28	1981
8	Unique		Quito	100 m	25	2020
9	EPIQ		Quito	98 m	25	2023
10	Qorner		Quito	98 m	24	2023
11	Torres de La Merced		Guayaquil	97 m	27	1984
12	Finansur		Guayaquil	95 m	30	1982
13	Torre Solari		Quito	95 m	22	2022
14	San Francisco 300		Guayaquil	91 m	26	1982
15	One		Quito	94 m	25	2019
16	Induauto		Guayaquil	94 m	22	1979
17	Imagine		Quito	87 m	24	2020
18	Yoo Quito		Quito	86 m	22	2018
19	Edificio CFN		Quito	83 m	27	1984
20	Edificio Metropolitan		Quito	83 m	19	2015
