= David Ledesma Vásquez =

- Born: December 17, 1934; Guayaquil, Ecuador
- Died: March 30, 1961 (aged 26); Guayaquil, Ecuador
- Occupations: Poet; theater actor

David Alberto Ledesma Vásquez (December 17, 1934 – March 30, 1961) was an Ecuadorian poet and theater actor, recognized posthumously for his influential contribution to 20th century Ecuadorian literature. Although his work went unnoticed for several years after his death, it eventually gained a cult following.

== Biography ==
Ledesma was born into a wealthy family on December 17, 1934, in Guayaquil, in the Guayas province. He completed his secondary studies at the Vicente Rocafuerte National High School.

From an early age he had a stormy relationship with his family, who did not accept his homosexuality, his inclination towards literature, or that he was different from his older brother, who had died years earlier as a hero during the Ecuadorian-Peruvian War. Ledesma's father tried to enroll him in military service, but he was rejected for suffering from flat feet and asthma. According to playwright José Guerra Castillo, who worked with Ledesma in the theater, Ledesma's father interned him for six months in a Lima clinic that subjected him to conversion therapy.

He was married for less than a year to actress Mercedes Cajamarca, with whom he had a daughter and maintained a friendly relationship until his death.

=== Literary career ===
Ledesma began his literary career in 1950 with the publication of his short story Soledad in the newspaper La Nación. The following year, his poem La muerte del saltamontes received a positive response from the poetry contests collectively known as the Floral Games of the Vida Porteña program.

During the 1950s Ledesma was a member of "Club 7", a group of seven young poets who achieved great notoriety in the local press. Ledesma was a key figure in the group, which also included Ileana Espinel, Miguel Donoso Pareja, Carlos Benavides Vega, Gastón Hidalgo, Charles Abadíe Silva and Sergio Román Armendáriz. Donoso and Abadíe left the group after learning that Ledesma and Benavides were gay.

In 1953 he published his first poetry book, Cristal. This was followed by Club 7 (1954), written with the remaining four members of the group, Gris (1958), which won an honorable mention from the Caracas newspaper Lírica Hispánica, and the section "Los días sucios" of the collaborative work Triángulo (1960).

=== Suicide and legacy ===
On March 30, 1961, Ledesma was found hanging in his parents' house, located in the Centenario neighborhood of Guayaquil. At the Radio CRE facility where he worked at the time, a letter was found in which he apologized to his partner from the program "Aquí Cuba" and asked him to take care of his ex-wife. In the pocket of his pants was also found a poem that has become known as Poema final.

At the time of his death, he left several poetry books unpublished, including one with the tentative name of La risa del ahorcado. In 1962, his poetry book Cuaderno de Orfeo, edited by Ileana Espinel, was published posthumously.

The National Literature Contest in Poetry, held by the House of Ecuadorian Culture, Guayas Nucleus, is named in his honor.

== Works ==
- Cristal (1953)
- Club 7 (1954), collaborative work
- Gris (1958)
- Triángulo (1960), collaborative work
- Cuaderno de Orfeo (1962)
- David Ledesma Vázquez, complete poetic collection (2007)

== See also ==
- LGBTQ literature in Ecuador
