= Guayaqueer =

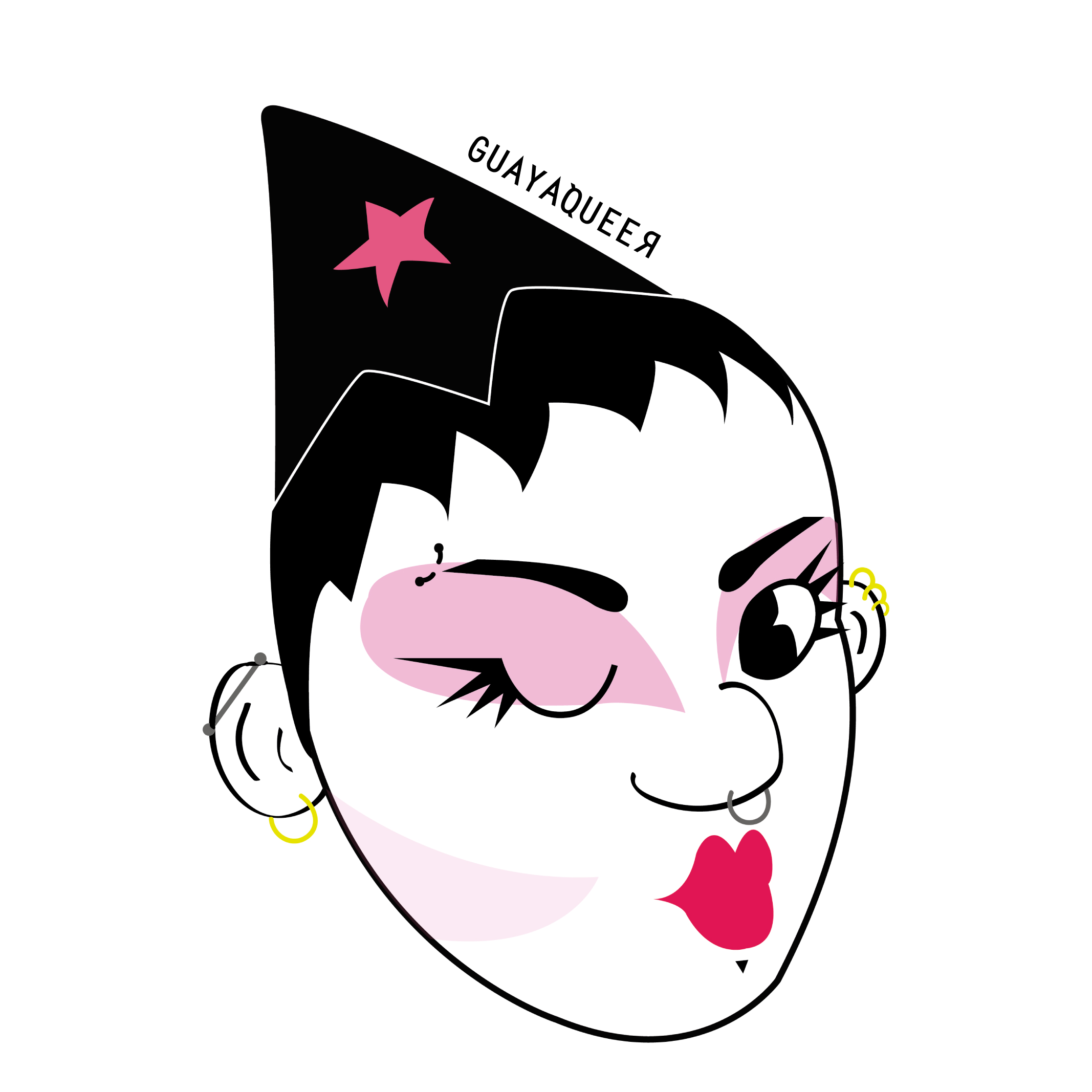
- Established: 2017
- Headquarters: Guayaquil
- Location: Ecuador
- Fields: LGBT+ rights

Guayaqueer is an artist collective established in 2017 as a platform for arts focused on LGBT illustrations and social media activism in Ecuador. In 2021, it opened an LGBT cultural center in Guayaquil, the first of its kind in the city. Among its best-known works was the Queer Coat of Arms, an illustration based on the Ecuador's coat of arms using the colors of the LGBT pride flag.

== History ==
Guayaqueer was established by the artist Víctor García in 2017 in Guayaquil in Ecuador as an initiative to generate and disseminate LGBT-based illustrations. Garcia, who did his studies in art in Italy and did an internship at the Cassero LGBT Center in Bologna, initially started selling T-shirts with his illustrations. He was later joined by artist Ismael Chock later joined, and they focused on LGBT iconography and topics that are considered taboo. Other artists such as Jordy de Los Milagros, Stephano Espinoza, Sara Donoso, and Andrea Alejandro joined the collective in the following years.

== Works ==
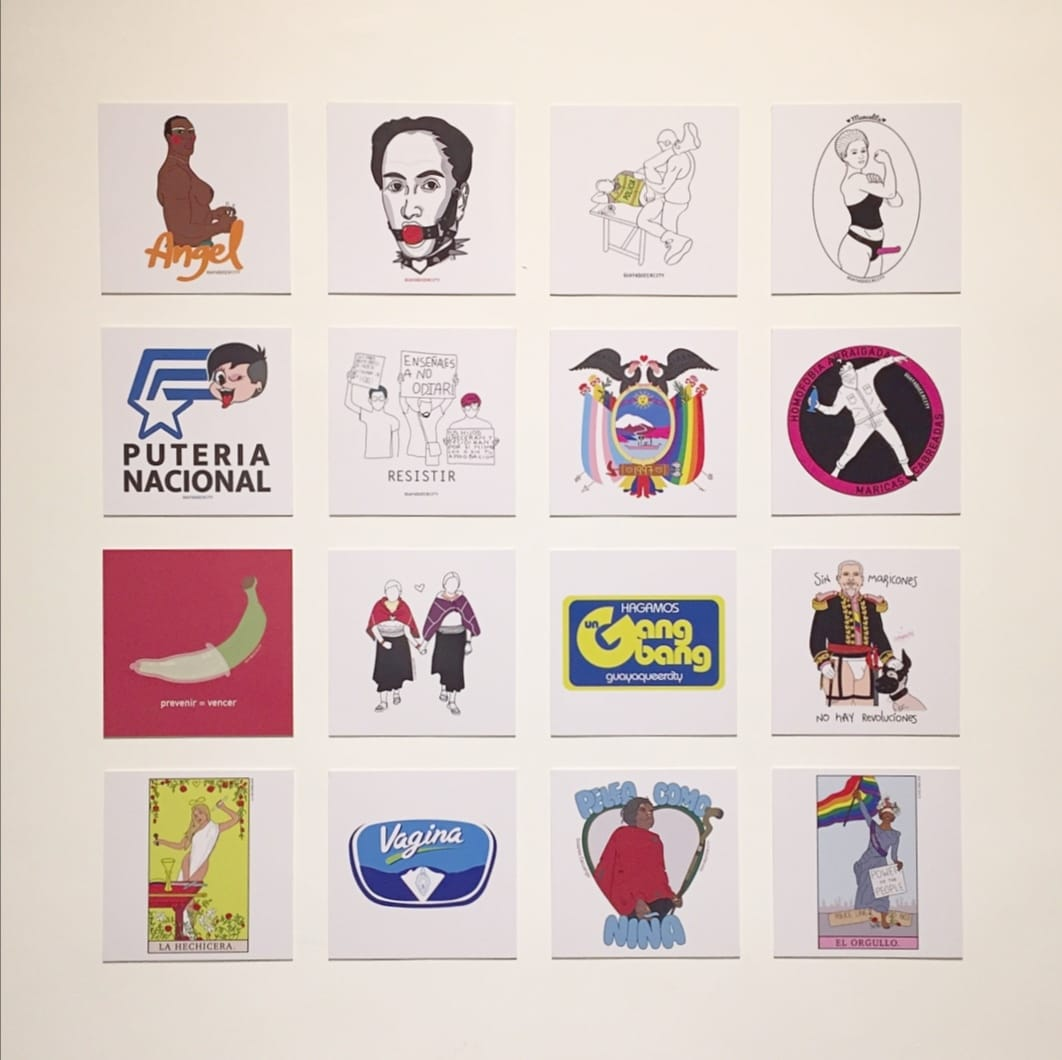
Works of the collective on display

The collective revised illustrations of art based on popular people, organizations, and symbols, combined with LGBT symbols. Their productions included art based on figures such as Eloy Alfaro and Manuela Sáenz, companies such as National Lottery and Almacenes La Ganga. The version of Juan Pueblo (es) superimposed with LGBT elements became the logo of the collective. Among the most talked-about and best-known works was the Queer Coat of Arms, an illustration based on the Ecuador's coat of arms using the colors of the LGBT pride flag.

While initially, the collective focused LGBT issue and sexual diversity, they later diversified into other issues such as feminism, student rights, rights of indigenous peoples and the decriminalization of abortion. It participated in campaigns such as the one against the character of La Michy (es), and the campaign for justice for the murder of Javier Viteri.

=== Cultural center ===
On 19 June 2021, Guayaqueer opened a cultural center in Guayaquil, which was located on the Circunvalación sur 203 Avenue, between the Panama and Pedro Carbo streets. As per the organization, it was conceived as a space to "rescue the history of the LGBTIQ+ and feminist movement of Ecuador" and to promote the work of young artists and activists. It was the first such space in the city, and became a venue for socializing events for the LGBT people, meetings and workshops on sexual diversity and for other cultural initiatives.

However, in May 2022, Guayaqueer announced the closure of its cultural center and the cessation of its artistic activities on social networks. According to its members, the closure was due to economic factors, since the cultural center failed to become self-sustaining despite the store with which it had inside for the sale of its illustrations, so the initial funds that they had gathered for its creation were exhausted.

== See also ==
- Guayaquil Pride
- LGBT rights in Ecuador
- LGBTQIA+ in Guayaquil
- Warmi tukushka
