= Ileana Espinel =

Ecuadorian journalist, poet and writer

Ileana Espinel Cedeño
- Born: Ileana Espinel Cedeño; October 31, 1933; Guayaquil, Ecuador
- Died: February 21, 2001 (aged 67); Guayaquil, Ecuador
- Occupations: Journalist, Poet, Writer
- Writing career
- Pen name: Ileana Espinel
- Language: Spanish

Ileana Espinel Cedeño (October 31, 1933 – February 21, 2001) was an Ecuadorian journalist, poet and writer. She was born and died in Guayaquil, Ecuador. Her pen name was Ileana Espinal.

== Biography ==
Born in Guayaquil on October 31, 1933, Espinel's father was Jorge Espinel Barreiro, who worked at the Customs department and later owned a pharmacy. Her father died prematurely in 1945 when she was 13 years old. Her mother was Professor Bertha Cedeño Chica. At the age of 10 Espinel would already write verses, and even helped her mother correct her students' theses.

In 1950, she graduated from high school and began studying in the School of Journalism, but she dropped out after a year and a half due to liver illness.

In 1953 she found in her home an old, tearing booklet of the celebrated poem “Como el Incensio” (Like Incense) by Aurora Estrada y Ayala, with a dedication made to her mother. She asked her mother about the author, and her mother immediately made a phone call to set up a meeting between them. The next day, Espinel went to visit Estrada y Ayala in the small garden of her house, with a notebook of her poems. Estrada y Ayala was very impressed by Espinel's poetry, and soon after, she published an article in the newspaper El Universo commenting on her poems “Tú sabes” (You Know) and “Te Quiero” (I Love You), which had been her favorite from among Espinel's first poems.

She co-founded "Club 7" (1951-1962), a group of seven young poets, which included David Ledesma Vázquez (1934-1961), Gastón Hidalgo Ortega (1929-1973), Carlos Benavides Vega (1931-1999), Sergio Román Armendáriz (1934 - ), Miguel Donoso Pareja (1931 - ), and Carlos Abadíe Silva. The club would recite their poems over radio stations, such as El El Telégrafo, and had some of their poems published in El Universo. In 1954, a 96-page collection of the group's poetry was published in a book titled "Club Siete". The book is very hard to find as only 500 copies were made. In 1951, Espinel and David Ledesma each recited a poem in El Telégrafo condemning the execution of Julius and Ethel Rosenberg who were United States citizens convicted of conspiracy to commit espionage during a time of war. Espinel was against the death penalty.

At the age of 23, Espinel became the first female member of The Ecuadorian Culture House. She was the editor of the Ecuadorian publications El Universo, El Telégrafo and La Nación, as well as the Mexican magazine Nivel and Venezuelan magazine Poesía. Espinel's favorite book of her own poetry was Piezas Líricas (1957). It had an initial printing of 1,500 booklets. It was the first book for which she earned money.

She was the principal Councillor of the Guayaquil canton (1967-1970).

== Death and legacy ==
Espinal died February 21, 2001.

Her poetry has been translated into English by Helen Wolh Paterson, into Portuguese by Ilka Sanchez, into French by Henri de Lescoet and Marcel Hennard, into Italian by Gino Rovida and Vicenso Josía, and into Greek by Olga Papastamou.

The International Festival of New Poetry "Ileana Espinel Cedeño" (Festival Internacional de Poesía Joven “Ileana Espinel Cedeño”) is named in her honor. The festival takes place from the 18th to the 22nd of November, and gathers poets from all over the world in Guayaquil, Ecuador.

== Awards ==
Gold Medal for Cultural Merit of First Class (1989) from the Ministry of Education of Ecuador

== Works ==
- Piezas líricas (Guayaquil, 1957)
- La estatua luminosa (Caracas, 1959)
- Arpa salobre (Caracas, 1966)
- Diríase que canto (Guayaquil, 1969)
- Tan solo trece (Guayaquil, 1972)
- Poemas escogidos (Guayaquil, 1978)
- Solo la isla (Quito, 1995)
