= Arenillas Canton =

- Canton
- Location of El Oro Province in Ecuador.

- Arenillas Canton in El Oro Province
- Coordinates: 3.55°S 80.06°W
- Country: Ecuador
- Province: El Oro Province
- Time zone: UTC-5 (ECT)

Arenillas Canton is a canton of Ecuador, located in the El Oro Province. Its capital is the town of Arenillas. Its population at the 2001 census was 22,477.

== Demographics ==
Ethnic groups as of the Ecuadorian census of 2010:

- Mestizo 84.4%
- White 5.4%
- Afro-Ecuadorian 4.7%
- Montubio 4.7%
- Indigenous 0.5%
- Other 0.2%
