= Murder of Itaberli Lozano =

2016 hate crime in Brazil

- Date: 29 December 2016
- Location: Cravinhos, Brazil
- Type: Homicide
- Cause: Murder

On 7 January 2017, the charred body of Itaberli Lozano, a 17-year-old teenager, was found in the Brazilian town of Cravinhos. He had been stabbed fatally, and his body had been burnt later. Subsequent investigation revealed that he was killed in a homophobic crime on 29 December 2016 by his mother Tatiana Lozano Pereira, after being beaten up by two hired men. After the trial, Tatiana was sentenced to 25 years in prison, while the two hitmen were sentenced to 21 years each.

== Background ==
Itaberli Lozano was born in the town of Cravinhos in the state of São Paulo on 13 September 1999. The 17-year-old, who attended Fernando Campos Rosas public school, worked as a clerk at a local supermarket and as a freelance photographer in 2016. Itaberli was gay, and on the night of 25 December 2016, Itaberli Lozano and his mother, 32-year old Tatiana Lozano Pereira, had an argument regarding Itaberli's sexual orientation. Disappointed with the lack of family acceptance of it in his family, the teenager decided to move in with his paternal grandmother.

A few days later, as Itaberli did not return home, his grandmother reported the disappearance to the authorities. The police began investigating the case, and later found the charred body of Itaberli on 7 January 2017.

== Incident ==
The police suspected Itaberli's mother Tatiana for the murder as she had not complained about her missing son, and due to her activities in the aftermath of the events. When the police interrogated her, she confessed to the crime.

As per Tatiana, on 29 December 2016, she convinced her son to return home in the disguise of making peace with him. However, she had previously hired two hitmen, Miller da Silva Barissa (18 years) and Victor Roberto da Silva (19 years), to beat up her son as a punishment for his sexual orientation. After the men beat Itaberli up, Tatiana asked them to kill her son. According to the police commissioner Helton Tosti Renz, as the men refused to kill Itaberli, Tatiana herself took a knife and stabbed Itaberli.

After the murder, Tatiana took the help of her husband, 30-year old Alex Pereira, who was Itaberli's stepfather, to conceal the body. They took the body to a remote location, and used reeds to burn it. As per Itaberli's uncle Darío Rosa, Tatiana hated his nephew and rejected him for being gay.

== Trial and sentencing ==
Tatiana and the three men were arrested for the crime. Tatiana was held in an all women prison in Cajuru and the men were held in the Santa Rosa do Viterbo prison near Cravinhos. After the trial, all the four were convicted, and Tatiana was sentenced to 25 years in prison, while the two hitmen were sentenced to 21 years each.
