= Murder of Wendy Calle =

1989 murder in Guayaquil, Ecuador

Wendy Tatiana Calle Alvarado was an Ecuadorian trans woman, who was found murdered on 11 November 1989 in the city of Guayaquil, Ecuador. The event received widespread media attention later after it was revealed that Calle had had a gender reassignment surgery, making her the first Ecuadorian known publicly to have undergone the procedure. Over the years, Calle became a symbol of the fight for LGBTQ rights in Ecuador.

== Murder and aftermath ==
On the night of 11 November 1989, Wendy Calle was returning from a nightclub in Guayaquil when she was intercepted and attacked by two men, who later strangled her. At first, it did not appear to be different from similar crimes committed in the city at the time. However, during the autopsy, doctors noticed that the internal organs of Calle did not match her external female genitals, and concluded that she had undergone a gender reassignment surgery including mammoplasty and vaginoplasty. The autopsy further showed that Calle had several bruises on her face, neck, hands, and the back, which were likely due to the attack she suffered before being killed.

When Calle's gender identity became public, her death received significant public interest in Ecuador as she was the first Ecuadorian to have been known publicly to have undergone gender reassignment surgery. According to the writer and academic Ernesto Carrión, the society showed a morbid interest in the case due to her identity as a trans woman rather than by the murder itself. He also indicated that Calle's death marked the beginning of the series of hate crimes that trans women suffered in Guayaquil in the following years. Those responsible for the murder of Calle's murder were never identified or caught.

== Legacy ==
Over the years, Calle became a symbol of the fight for the rights of the LGBTQ people in Ecuador. In 2017, transgender model Neida Barcos revealed that she would make a film based on the life of Calle, which was to be directed by Marco Antonio Valenzuela, who claimed that they wanted to make the film as a way to raise awareness against violence against LGBT people in Ecuador. Two years later, Ecuadorian director Mario Díaz indicated that his web series Ciudad pretexto, based on the novel Triptych of a City (2016), would include a character known inspired by Wendy Calle.

== See also ==
- LGBT history in Ecuador
