= Warmi tukushka =

Warmi tukushka is one of the characters of the Pawkar Raymi, an Indigenous religious festival celebrated in Ecuador. The character is usually a male, who cross dresses in a female attire, and often goes from house to house while playing a drum and dancing, accompanied by several single men. Apart from the Pawkar Raymi, Warmi tukushkas also participate in other indigenous festivals, such as Inti Raymi.

== Description ==
Warmi tukushka a character in the celebration of Pawkar Raymi, an indigenous religious festival, observed by indigenous communities such as Puruhá and Quechua in Ecuador. The term is derived from Quechua language and roughly translates to "the one who transforms into a woman" or "man dressed as a woman". Warmi tukushkas represent the sexual diversity and culture prevalent in the Ecuadorian indigenous populations.

Apart from the Pawkar Raymi, Warmi tukushkas also participate in other indigenous festivals, such as Inti Raymi, celebrated in Cotacachi, where they participate alongside women's groups in the celebrations in the public square of the city.

== Attire and practice ==
Warmi tukushka is usually a male character, who dresses in a female attire. The attire is seen as a form of occasional indigenous crossdressing, in which a man seeks to represent his inner female self. The characters wear traditionally colorful clothing, representing the deity Pachamama.

The role is traditionally played by the most important man in the village. The attire consists of a hairdo made of cabuya leaves and painted in black, a woolen hat decorated with colorful ribbons, an anaco (female dress), washkas (beaded necklace), and espadrilles (canvas slipper). In some cases, the character carries an image of a child on their backs as a representation of fertility.

The Warmi tukushkas go from house to house while playing a drum and dancing, accompanied by several single men. They perform a tushuy dance, which consists of three steps, and made up of moves such as small jumps, and curvilinear or zigzagging movements.
