= Ismael Pérez Pazmiño =

Ecuadorian writer and politician (1876–1944)

- Born: June 30, 1876; Machala, El Oro Province, Ecuador
- Died: November 1, 1944 (aged 68); Los Angeles, CA
- Occupations: Newspaper owner, Writer, Senator
- Known for: Founder of El Universo

Ismael Pérez Pazmiño (Machala, June 30, 1876 - Los Angeles, November 1, 1944) was founder of El Universo newspaper of Guayaquil, Ecuador, and former senator of El Oro province.

He was born in Machala in El Oro province. His parents were José Pérez Santander and Elena Pazmiño Gómez.

On September 16, 1921, he published the first edition of El Universo.

He was married to Herlinda Castro Santander de Pérez Pazmiño. They had five children.

El Universo is still run by Pérez Pazmiño's descendants.

Many educational institutions and streets bear his name in Ecuador.

He died of cancer in Los Angeles, California on November 1, 1944.
