= Torre The Point =

Office skyscraper in Guayaquil, Ecuador

The Point
- The skyscraper in June 2015
- Interactive map of the The Point area

General information
- Status: Completed
- Location: Guayaquil, Ecuador
- Coordinates: 2°10′41.7″S 79°52′33.8″W
- Construction started: 2011
- Completed: 2013

Height
- Roof: 136.5 m (448 ft)

Technical details
- Structural system: Concrete
- Floor count: 36

Design and construction
- Architect: Christian Wiese Architects
- Developer: Pronobis

The Point is an office skyscraper located in Guayaquil, Ecuador. Built between 2011 and 2013, the building stands at a height of 136.5 m (448 ft) with 36 floors. It is currently the second-tallest building in Ecuador after Torre Maxximus, which surpassed it in September 2026. The skyscraper forms part of the Ciudad del Río complex. Ecuadorian architect Christian Wiese led the design and construction of the building, while Sergio Torassa, executive president of Pronobis, managed the project financing.

== History ==
Torre The Point under construction in 2012

It is located next to The Maxximus, another skyscraper. At 136.5 m high, it surpassed the La Previsora Building as the tallest in Ecuador, which was the tallest in the city and the country for 18 years.

The project aims to create a visually striking building with traditional construction methods in Guayaquil, emphasizing architectural concepts over technology or budget. The tower can be found in the Ciudad del Río urban development, situated to the north of the Malecón and adjacent to the Guayas River. The tower concept establishes a symbol and urban icon for the region and the city. The objective was to construct an outstanding structure with basic technology, resulting in a standard 32m x 32m square layout that ascends vertically with a 6-degree anti-clockwise twist, reaching a height of 36 floors.

Circular cuts are made on the corners of the square to prevent significant overhangs when the square is rotated. It is a compression structure in a radial circular shape, featuring orthogonal diaphragms and perimeter overhangs. The floors and envelope rotate upwards, floor by floor, adding a sculptural quality to the building. The outcome is a curvy sculptural form resembling a rope or a woman's body.

== See also ==
- List of tallest buildings in Ecuador
- Torre Banco de la Nación, the tallest building in Peru

Records
Preceded by Banco La Previsora	Tallest building in Ecuador; 2014–2026	Succeeded by Torre Maxximus
