= Alfonso Aguilar Ruilova =

- Born: March 5, 1914; Guayaquil, Ecuador
- Died: March 10, 1989 (aged 75); Guayaquil, Ecuador
- Occupation: Educator

Alfonso Aguilar Ruilova (March 5, 1914 – March 10, 1989) was an Ecuadorian educator, lawyer, and journalist.

== Biography ==
Alfonso Aguilar Ruilova was born in Guayaquil on March 5, 1914. His parents were Alfonso Aguilar Izquierdo and Margarita Ruilova.

In 1963 he founded the Universidad Laica Vicente Rocafuerte de Guayaquil (ULVR). In 1972 the government awarded him the First Class Medal of Honor in Education. In 1978 the government awarded him the National Order of Merit.

He died in Guayaquil on March 10, 1989.
