= Sergio Román Armendáriz =

Ecuadorian writer

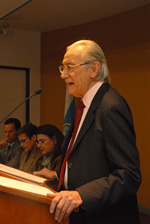
- Born: Sergio Román Armendáriz; February 12, 1934 (age 92); Riobamba, Ecuador
- Occupations: Poet, playwright
- Writing career
- Language: Spanish

Sergio Román Armendáriz (born February 12, 1934) is an Ecuadorian poet, playwright, and university teacher.

Roman Sergio Armendariz was born in Riobamba, Ecuador on February 12, 1934, at the home of Roman Nazario Armendariz Krelowa and Alejandrina Carranza.

Armendáriz began his schooling in Guayaquil's Salesian College Christopher Columbus. He earned a bachelor's degree from the Vicente Rocafuerte College in 1951. Later, he joined the faculty of Law and Science Association of the University of Guayaquil, where he worked from 1952 to 1958. His first foray into writing was in journalism, a profession he started while he lived in Guayaquil.

While living in Guayaquil as a young man he was a member of the group of young poets called "Club 7" (1951-1962).

== Family and marriage ==
Armendáriz was the oldest of three brothers, Nazario and Alejandro. He married Lydia Maria Sanchez Valverde, a Costa Rican professor. He has a daughter and three sons with her.

He has lived and worked in Costa Rica since the 1960s.

== Works ==
- Club 7 (1954), a collection of poems by members of the "Club 7".
- Cuaderno de canciones (poetry, 1959)
- Función para butacas (theater, 1972).
- Triángulo (poetry, 1960), with David Ledesma Vásquez and Ileana Espinel.
- 10 cuentos universitarios (editor, 1955) ed. of the Federation of University Students of Ecuador
- 33 poemas universitarios (editor, 1955) ed. of the Federation of University Students of Ecuador

== Career in Costa Rica ==
Armendáriz's first job in Costa Rica was at the Conservatorio Castella Scenic Area, which he joined in 1963. After a year he began teaching Spanish and social studies in the Lincoln School. He was also director of the school's drama club, with which he staged Federico García Lorca's “The Shoemaker's Prodigious Wife.”

Armendáriz began teaching at the University of Costa Rica's School of General Studies from 1968, where he held classes in Appraisal of Literature. He became a vital link between the former Faculty of Arts and Sciences and the Theater of General Studies, organizing cultural activities. He also taught at the School of Dramatic Arts. He was also editor of Palabra magazine, Department of General Studies, of the University of Costa Rica (1968 – 1974).

Armendáriz applied for a grant to further his academics from the University of Costa Rica. He got a grant and enrolled at the University Center of Cinematographic Studies and Race Dramatic Literature and Theater of the Faculty of Philosophy and Letters of the National Autonomous University of Mexico. He graduated in 1979. He returned to Costa Rica and enrolled at the School of Science Mass Communication. There, he joined courses in Communication Studies, Media Production, Production Written, Art and Communication and Workshop Screenplay. In 2008 he became Professor Emeritus of the School of Communication Studies, Faculty of Social Sciences of the University of Costa Rica.

Coscriptwriter of the movie Nuestro Juramento (Our Promise) (1981) about the life of the popular Ecuadorian singer Julio Jaramillo. The movie is named after Nuestro Juramento, one of Julio Jaramillo's most famous songs.

He published many articles in Costa Rica and has been a consultant for some television series there.
