= El Universo =

Ecuadorian newspaper

EL Universo
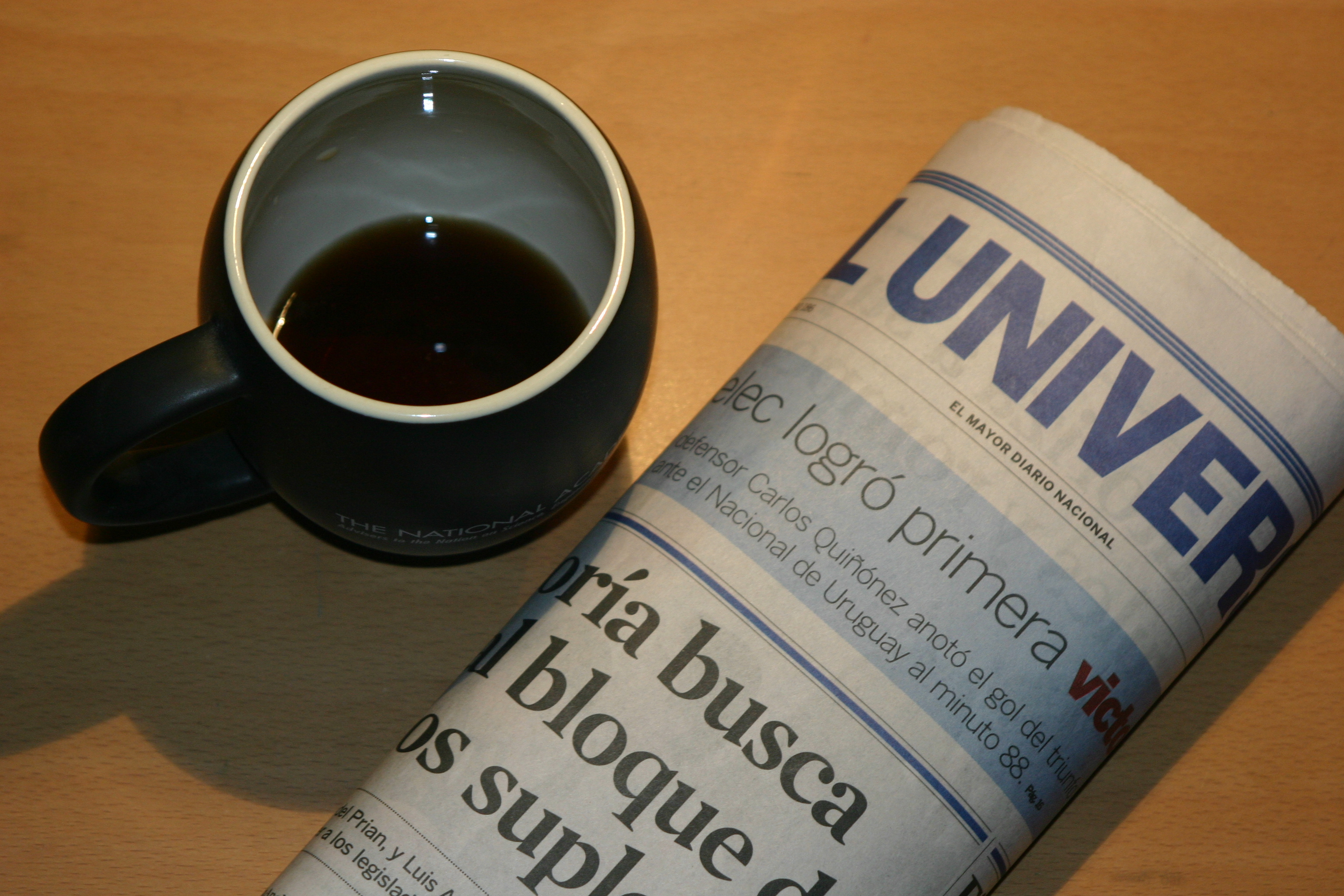
- Type: Daily newspaper
- Format: 41×28cm
- Owner(s): Carlos, Cesar and Nicolas Perez
- Editor: Nila Velazquez
- Founded: 1921
- Political alignment: Center-right; Conservative
- Headquarters: Guayaquil
- Website: eluniverso.com

El Universo (Spanish for "The Universe") is one of the largest daily newspapers in Ecuador. It was founded in 1921 and the first edition was published September 16 of the same year. Its headquarters are located in Guayaquil.

The newspaper has been published since its foundation with only small interruptions during the dictatorship. The founder was Ismael Pérez Pazmiño. El Universo is a member of Asociación Ecuatoriana de Editores de Periódicos (AEDEP), Sociedad Interamericana de Prensa (SIP) and the World Association of Newspapers (WAN).

== Sections ==
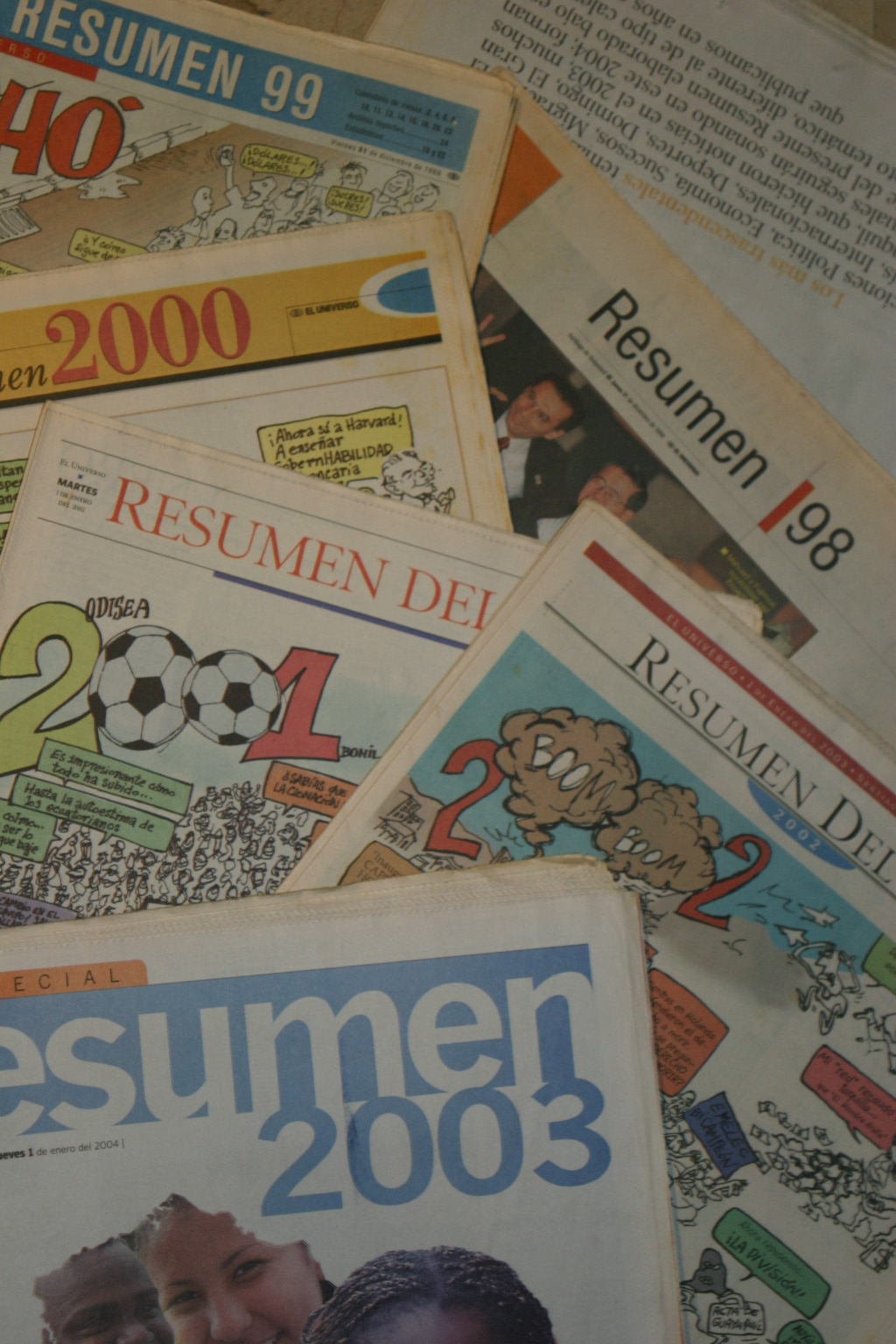
Special New Year editions

- Política – Politics
- Economía – Economics
- Sucesos – Crime
- Migración – Migration
- País – News from the provinces
- Internacionales- International news
- Marcador – Sports
- El Gran Guayaquil – Guayaquil News
- Vida – Life style
- En Escena – Show business

== Supplements ==
- Sambo, a magazine-style supplement published monthly for Samborondón.
- Mi Mundo, children supplement published on Saturdays.
- Negocios, economics supplement published on Saturdays.
- La Revista, a magazine-style supplement on Sunday.

== 2010 libel suit ==
In 2010, Ecuadorian president Rafael Correa filed a criminal libel complaint against El Universo's directors and editor, Emilio Palacio. The complaint cited a column in which Palacio stated that Correa had permitted soldiers to fire on a hospital to suppress a violent police protest. A temporary magistrate who heard the case granted the president US$42 million in damages. The decision was upheld by the Supreme Court on 17 February 2012, but was suspended by the Inter-American Commission on Human Rights four days later pending further review.

The decision caused significant international criticism from newspapers, human rights groups, and press freedom organizations. An editorial in The New York Times described the verdict as "a staggering, shameful blow to the country's democracy", while Reporters Without Borders called it "draconian" and a "grave legal precedent". Correa, in contrast, described the verdict as a blow to the "dictatorship" of a corrupt press.

On 27 February 2012, Correa pardoned the four defendants, stating that he had "never wanted this trial" but only wanted the public to know the truth. Later that year, the newspaper was awarded the inter-American Maria Moors Cabot prize. The citation read, "Even in the face of Correa's bullying and the threat of incarceration, El Universo and many other Ecuadoran journalists have courageously defended their right and obligation to speak out for a democratic society."
